= Agdan =

Village in Tavush, Armenia

- Location within Armenia
- Coordinates: 40°50′55″N 45°08′59″E
- Country: Armenia
- Marz (Province): Tavush
- Time zone: UTC+4 ( )
  - Summer (DST): UTC+5 ( )

Agdan (also, Verin-Agdan and Verkhniy Agdan) is a village in the Tavush Province of Armenia.
