= Berdavan, Armenia (town) =

Berdavan Բերդավան
- Location within Armenia Location within Tavush
- Coordinates: 41°12′10″N 45°00′12″E
- Country: Armenia
- Marz (Province): Tavush

Population (2008)
  - Total: 3,421
- Time zone: UTC+4 ( )
  - Summer (DST): UTC+5 ( )

Berdavan (Armenian: Բերդավան) is a town in the Tavush Province of Armenia.

== See also ==
- Tavush Province
