= Geghatap =

Geghatap Գեղատափ
- Location within Armenia Location within Tavush
- Coordinates: 40°41′N 45°00′E
- Country: Armenia
- Province: Tavush
- Municipality: Dilijan

Population (2017)
  - Total: 0
- Time zone: UTC+4

Geghatap (Armenian: Գեղատափ; Azerbaijani: Murteyl) is an abandoned village in the Dilijan Municipality of the Tavush Province of Armenia. The village was populated by Azerbaijanis before the exodus of Azerbaijanis from Armenia after the outbreak of the Nagorno-Karabakh conflict.

== Etymology ==
The village was formerly known as Chichakbulag (Azerbaijani: Çiçəkbulaq, lit. 'flower spring') and was renamed Geghatap in 1991.
