= Eridzor =

- Location within Armenia Location within Tavush
- Coordinates: 40°50′N 45°32′E
- Country: Armenia
- Marz (Province): Tavush
- Time zone: UTC+4 ( )
  - Summer (DST): UTC+5 ( )

Eridzor is a town in the Tavush Province of Armenia.

== See also ==
- Tavush Province
