= Itsakar =

Itsakar Իծաքար
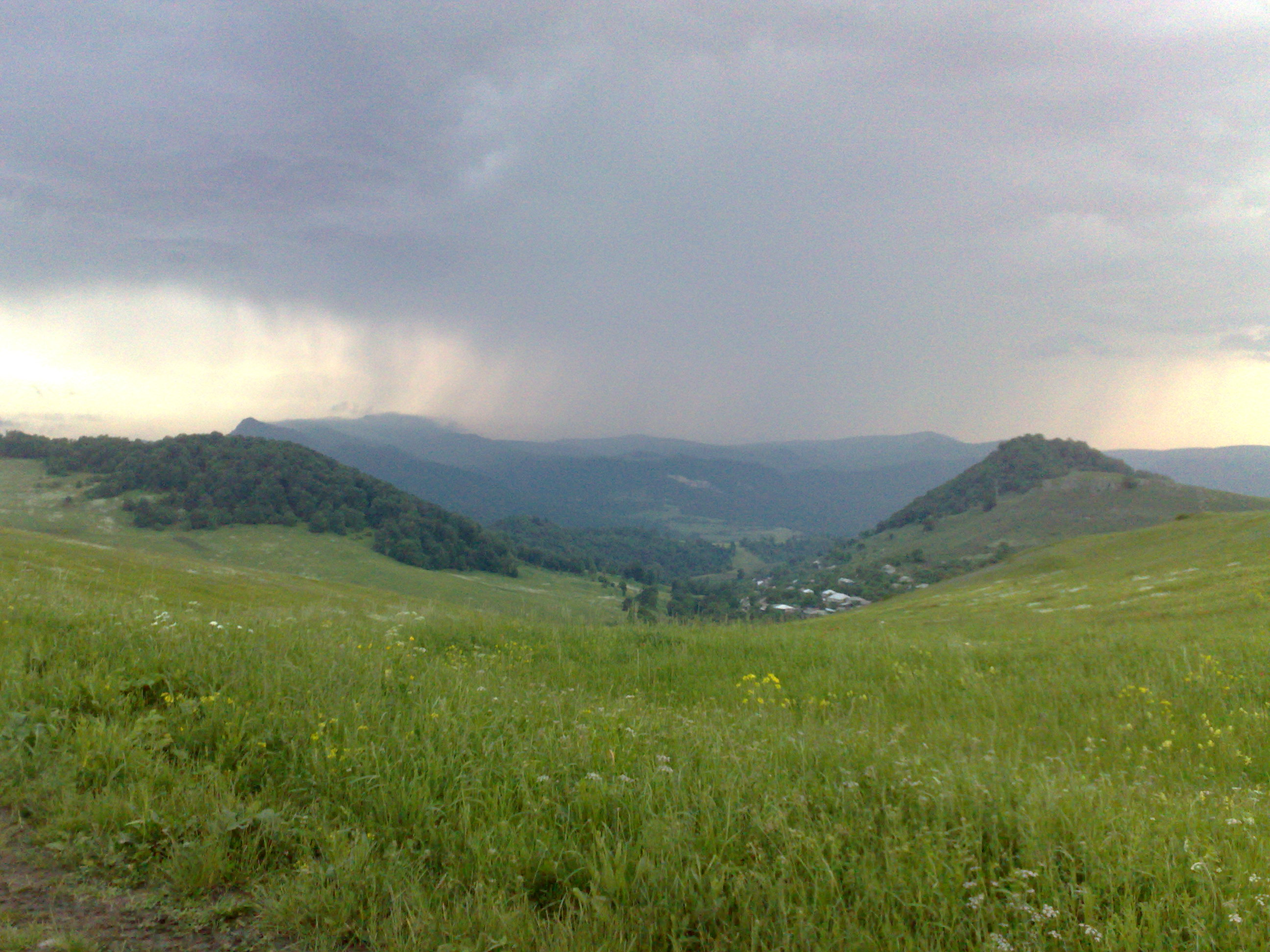
- Scenery around Itsakar

- Location within Armenia Location within Tavush
- Coordinates: 40°52′N 45°18′E
- Country: Armenia
- Province: Tavush
- Municipality: Berd

Population (2011)
  - Total: 292
- Time zone: UTC+4 (AMT)

Itsakar (Armenian: Իծաքար) is a village in the Berd Municipality of the Tavush Province of Armenia.
