= Kirgi =

- Location within Armenia Location within Tavush
- Coordinates: 40°50′28″N 45°29′54″E
- Country: Armenia
- Marz (Province): Tavush
- Time zone: UTC+4 (Armenia Time)

Kirgi is a town in the Tavush Province of Armenia.
