= Gomer, Armenia =

Gomer
- Location within Armenia Location within Tavush
- Coordinates: 40°50′N 45°33′E
- Country: Armenia
- Marz (Province): Tavush
- Time zone: UTC+4 ( )

Gomer is an abandoned village in the Tavush Province of Armenia.

== See also ==
- Tavush Province
