= Geyarchin =

- Location within Armenia Location within Tavush
- Coordinates: 40°45′N 45°03′E
- Country: Armenia
- Marz (Province): Tavush
- Time zone: UTC+4 ( )
  - Summer (DST): UTC+5 ( )

Geyarchin is a town in the Tavush Province of Armenia. Also known as a part of past West Azerbaijan

== See also ==
- Tavush Province
