= Papanino =

- Location within Armenia Location within Tavush
- Coordinates: 40°44′28″N 44°50′35″E
- Country: Armenia
- Marz (Province): Tavush
- Time zone: UTC+4 ( )
  - Summer (DST): UTC+5 ( )

Papanino is a town in the Tavush Province of Armenia.
