= Tarsachay =

- Location within Armenia Location within Tavush
- Coordinates: 40°46′N 45°01′E
- Country: Armenia
- Marz (Province): Tavush
- Time zone: UTC+4 ( )

Tarsachay is an abandoned village in the Tavush Province of Armenia.
