= Sarigyugh =

Sarigyugh Սարիգյուղ
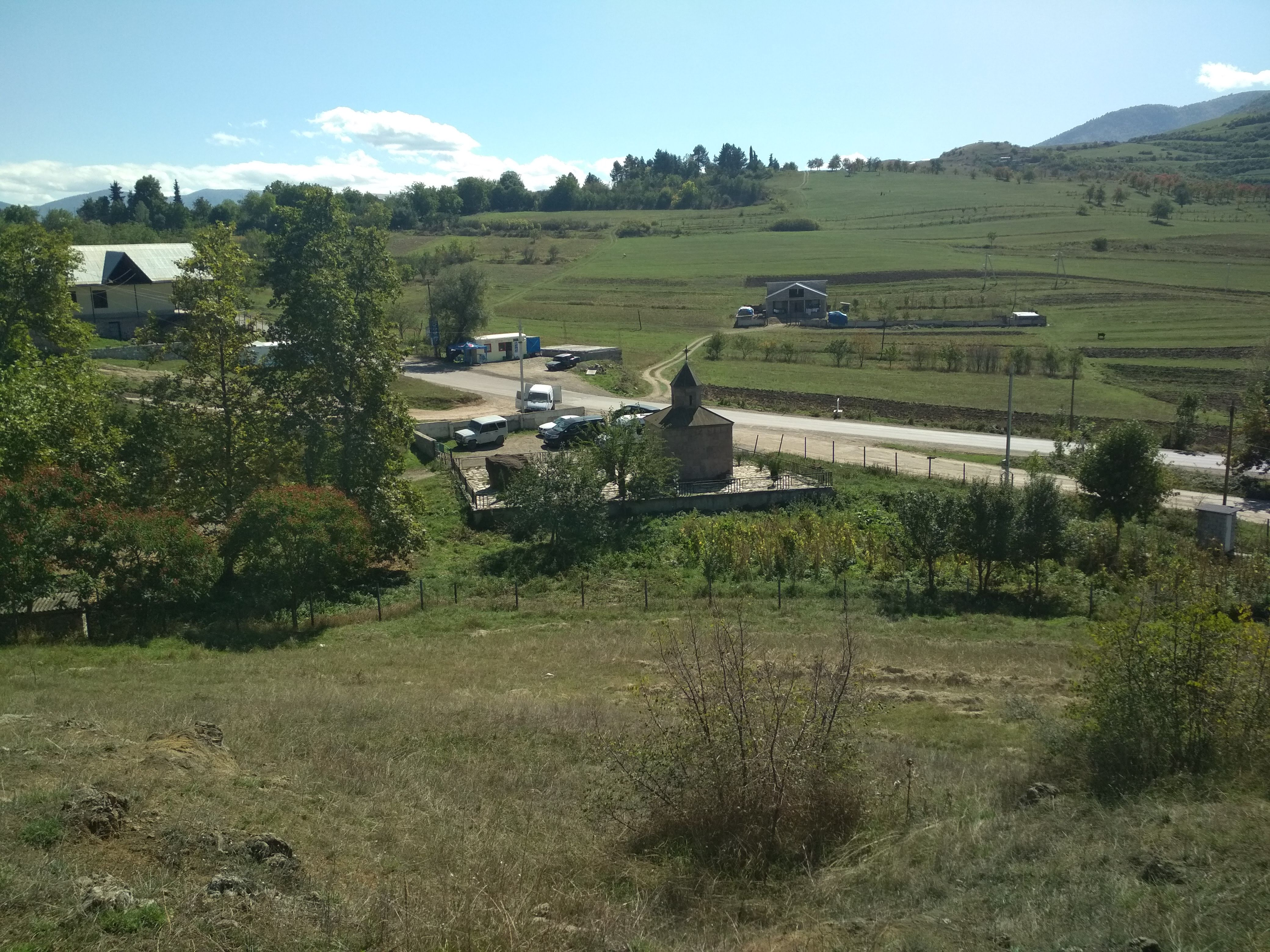
- Scenery around Sarigyugh

- Location within Armenia Location within Tavush
- Coordinates: 41°03′23″N 45°08′45″E
- Country: Armenia
- Province: Tavush
- Municipality: Ijevan

Population (2011)
  - Total: 1,226
- Time zone: UTC+4 (AMT)

Sarigyugh (Armenian: Սարիգյուղ) is a village in the Ijevan Municipality of the Tavush Province of Armenia.

== Toponymy ==
The village was previously known as Srygekh and Srigekh.

== Gallery ==
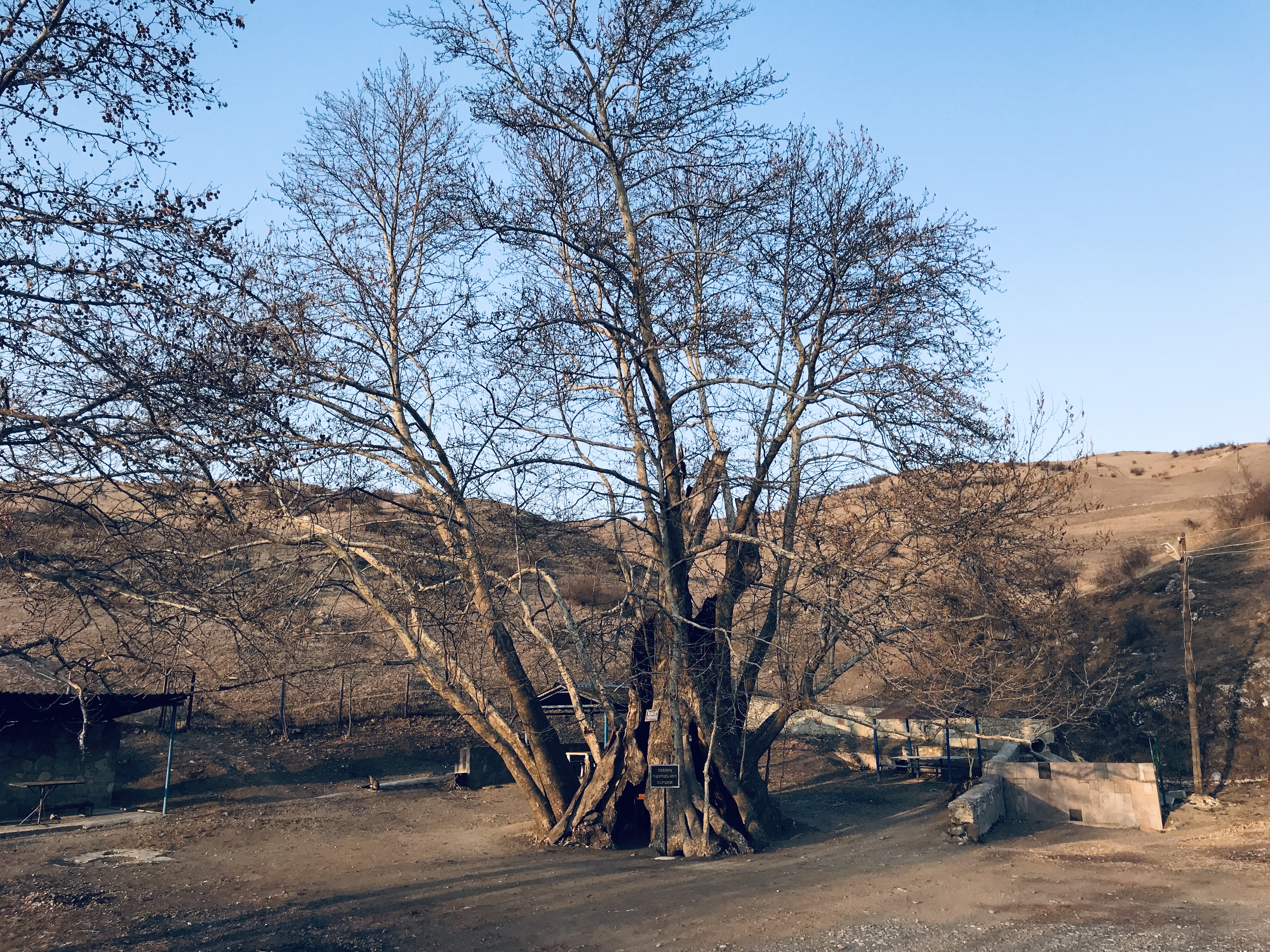
Platanus in Sarigyugh

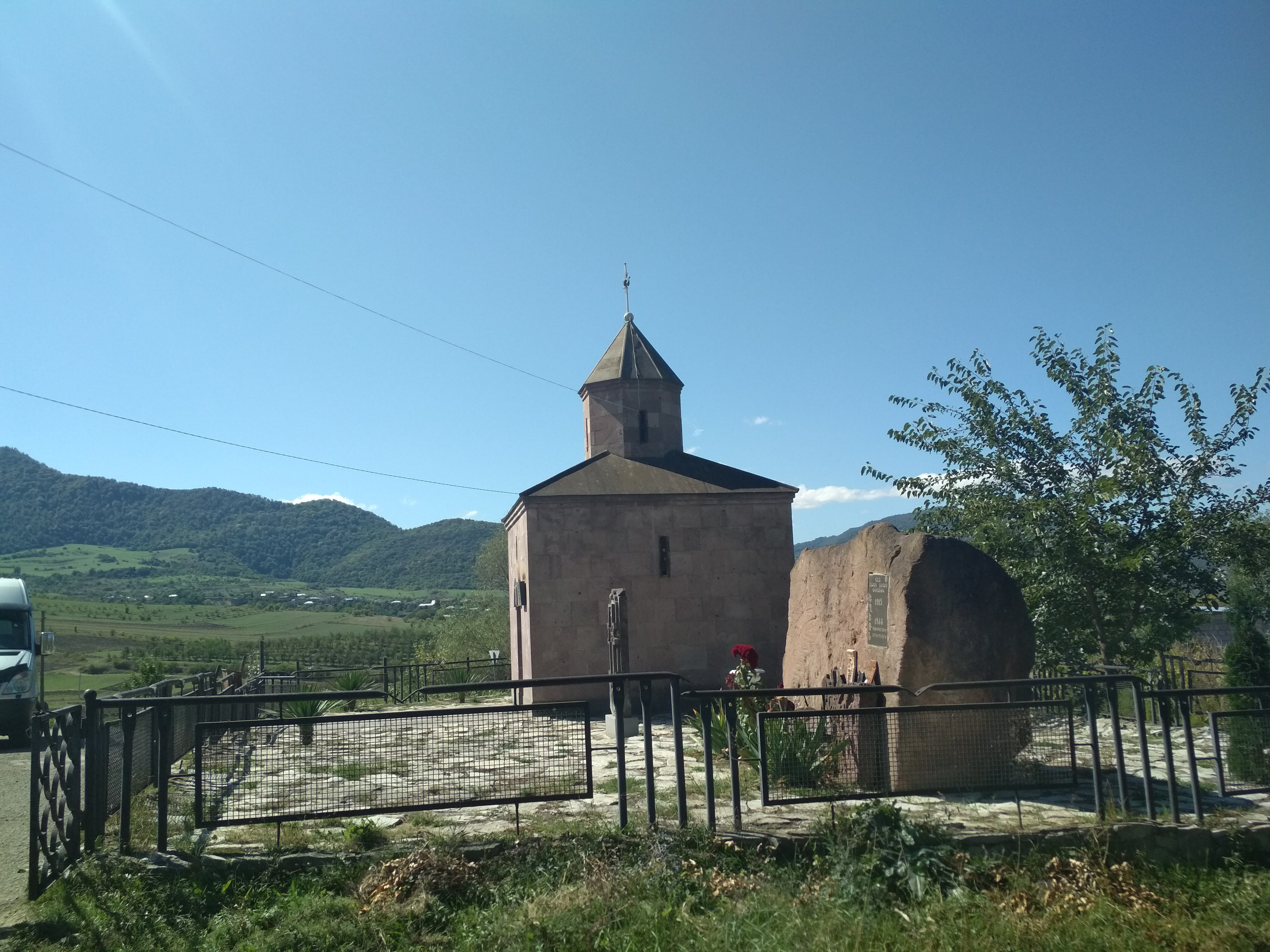
St. Hovhannes Church in Sarigyugh

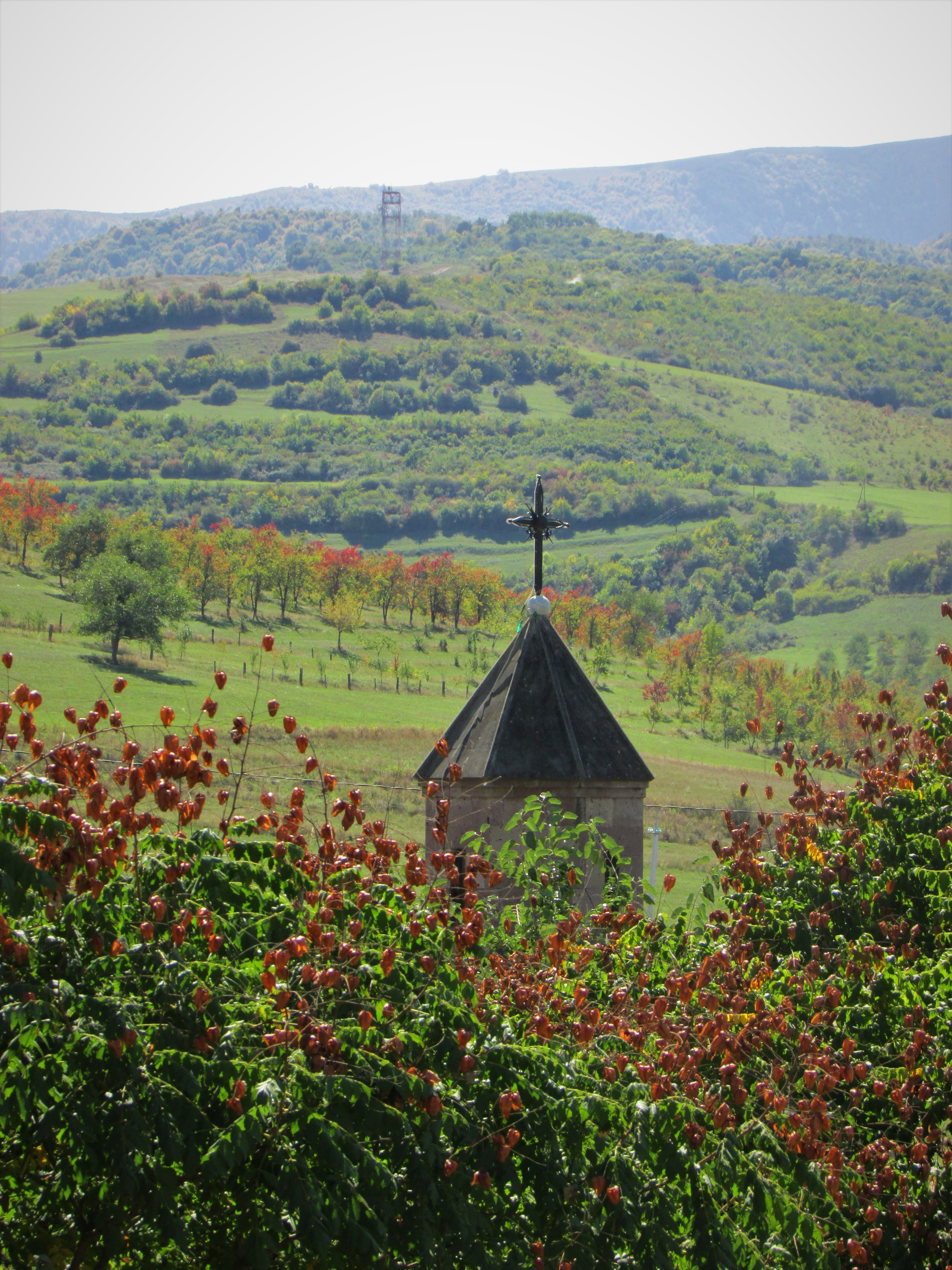
Scenery around St. Hovhannes Church

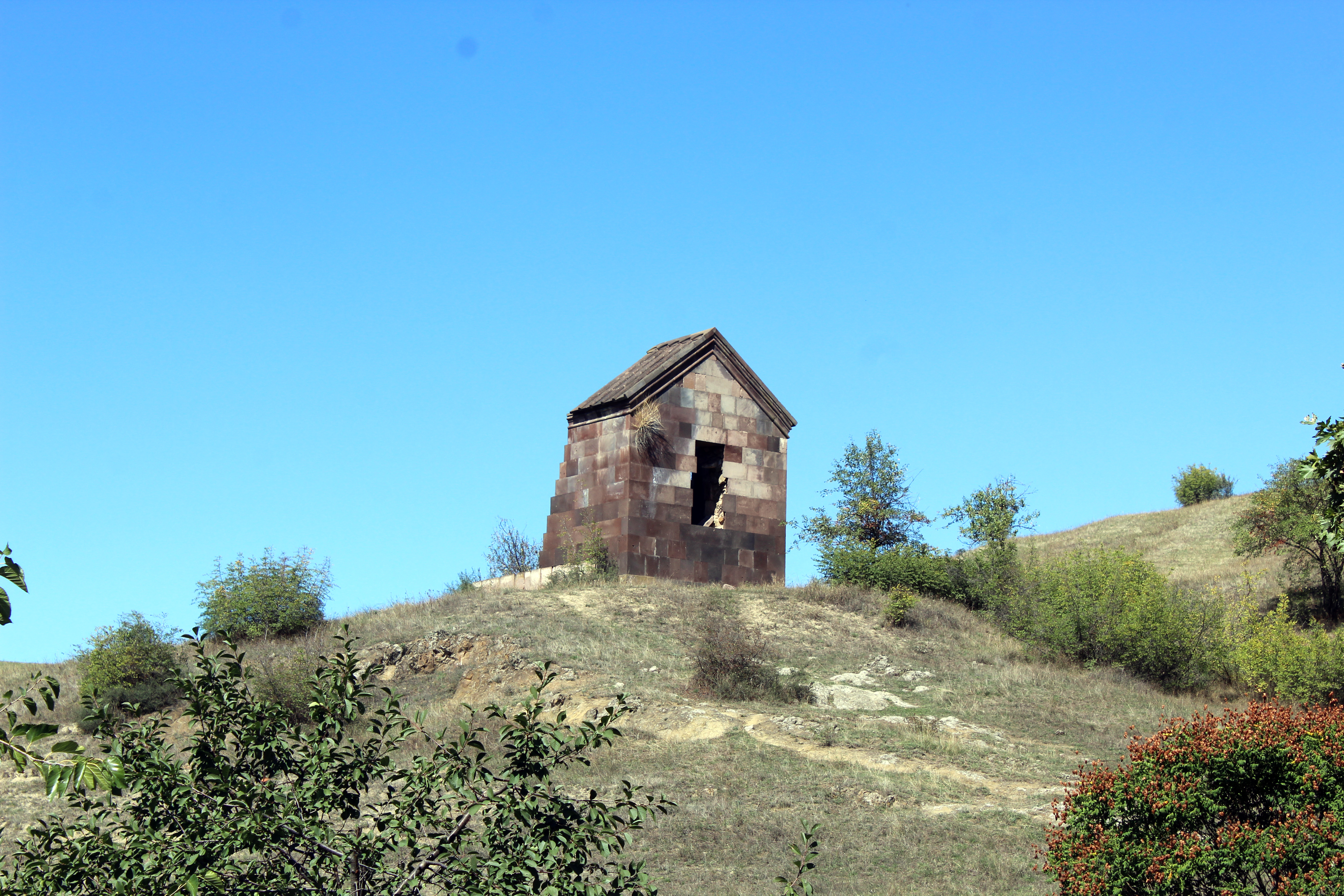
Ruined chapel in Sarigyugh

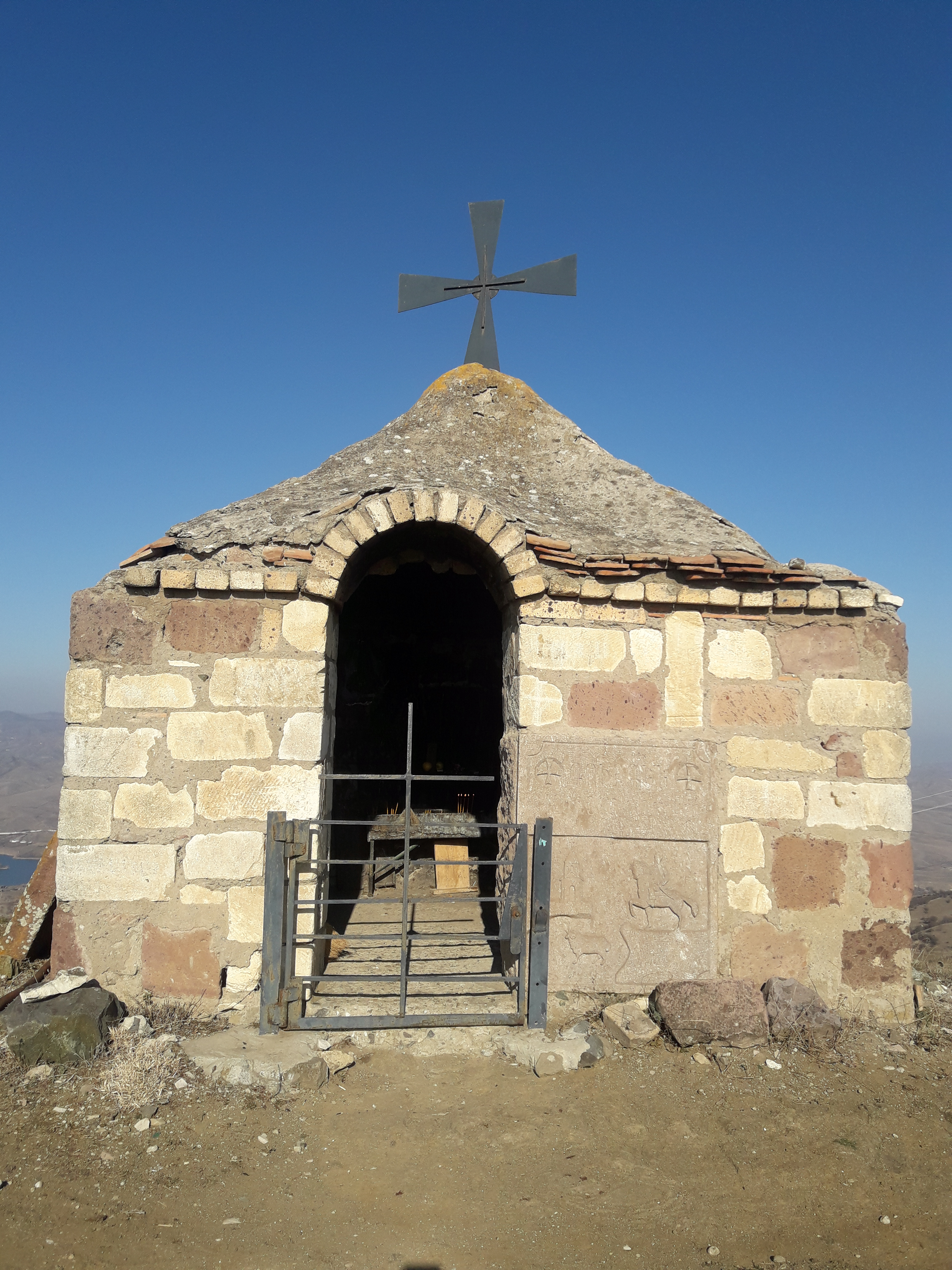
Chapel in Sarigyugh

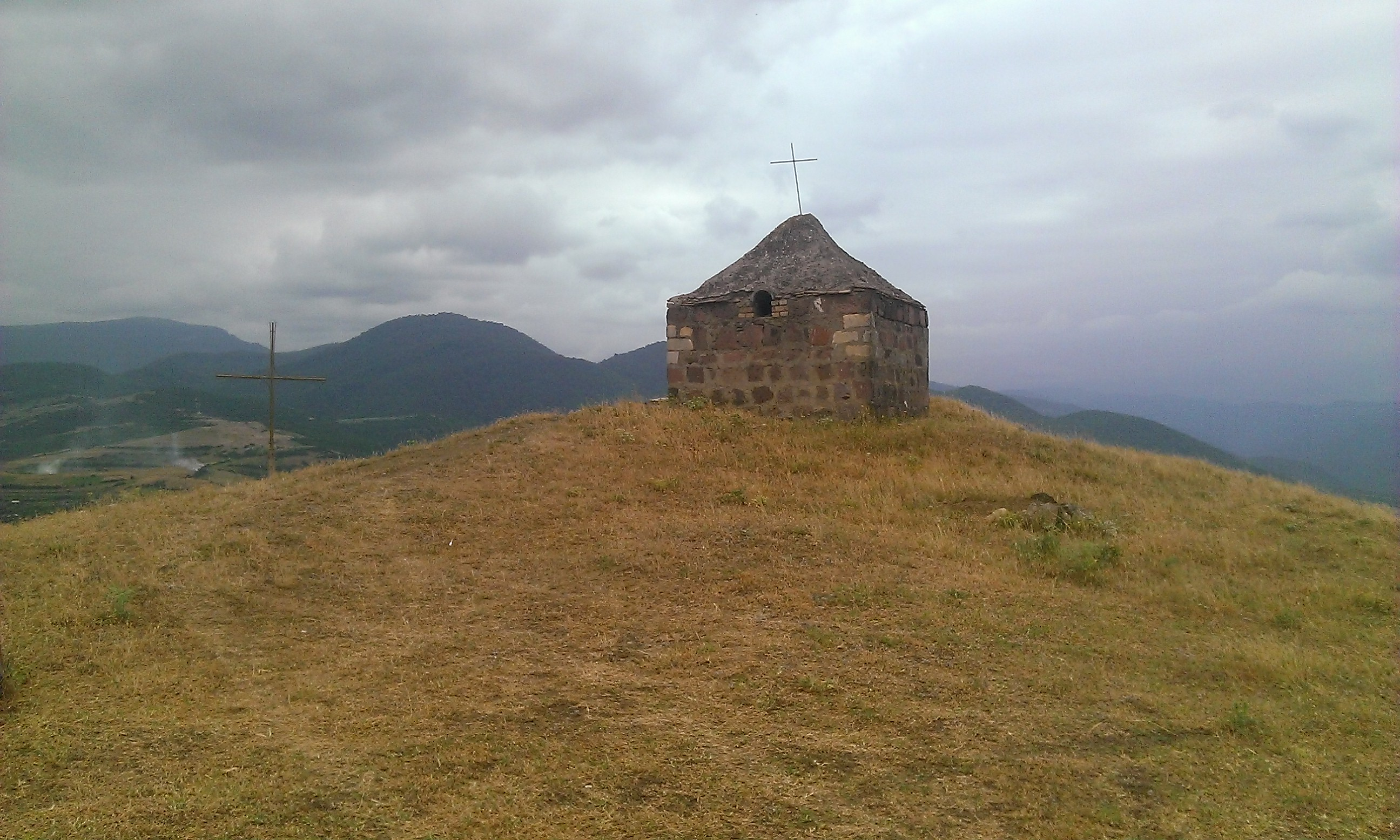
12th/13th-century chapel in Sarigyugh
