= Chermakavan =

Chermakavan Ճերմակավան
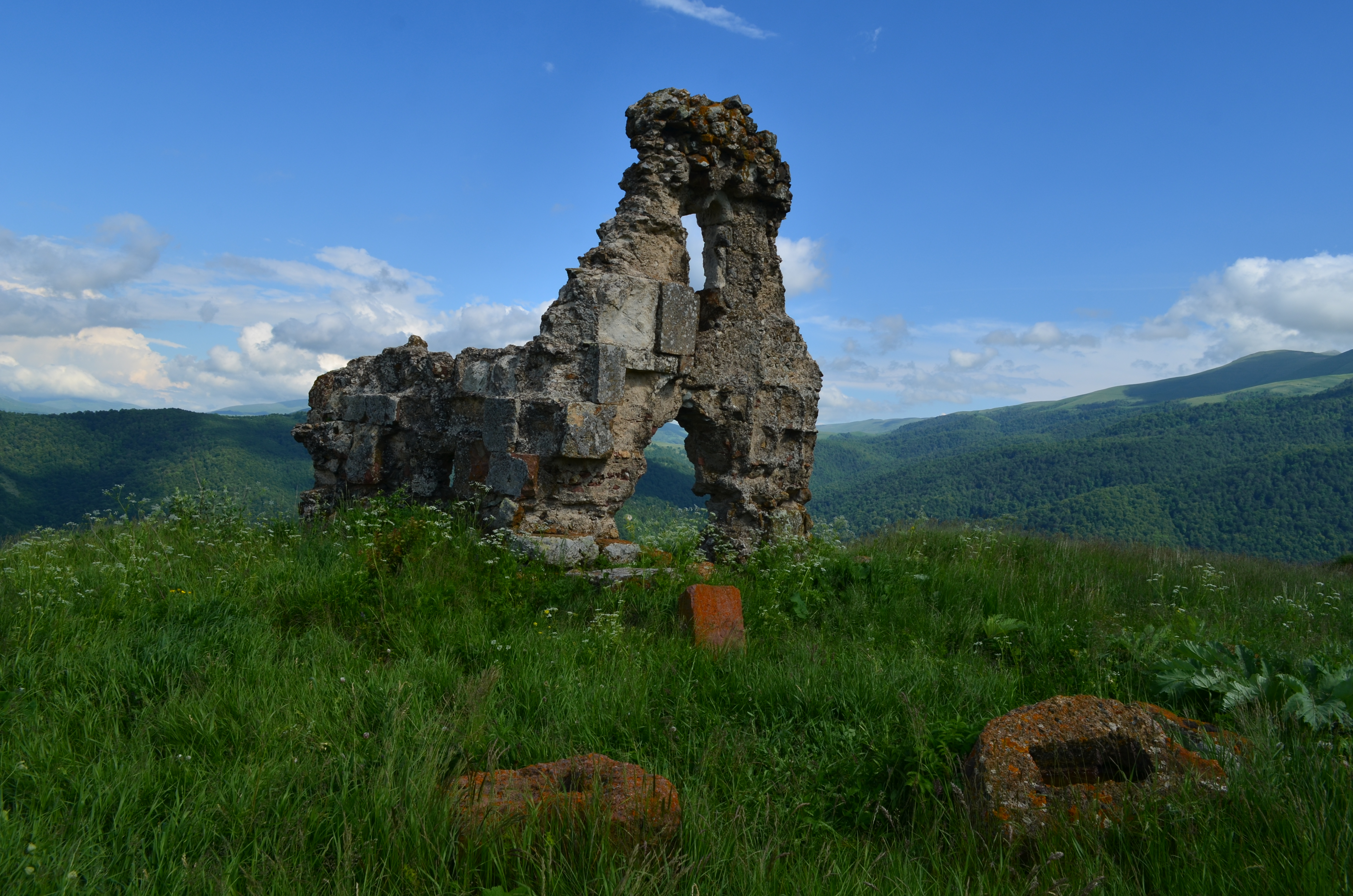

- Location within Armenia Location within Tavush
- Coordinates: 40°43′N 45°02′E
- Country: Armenia
- Province: Tavush
- Municipality: Dilijan
- Time zone: UTC+4

Chermakavan (Armenian: Ճերմակավան) is a village in the Dilijan Municipality of the Tavush Province of Armenia. In 1989 Armenians, deported from Azerbaijan, settled in the village.
