= Chirchiri =

Abandoned village in Tavush, Armenia

- Location within Armenia Location within Tavush
- Coordinates: 40°49′03″N 45°08′03″E
- Country: Armenia
- Marz (Province): Tavush
- Time zone: UTC+4 ( )

Chirchiri is an abandoned village in the Tavush Province of Armenia.

== See also ==
- Tavush Province
