= Samsonavank Monastery =

Cultural heritage monument of Armenia

- Սամսոնավանք
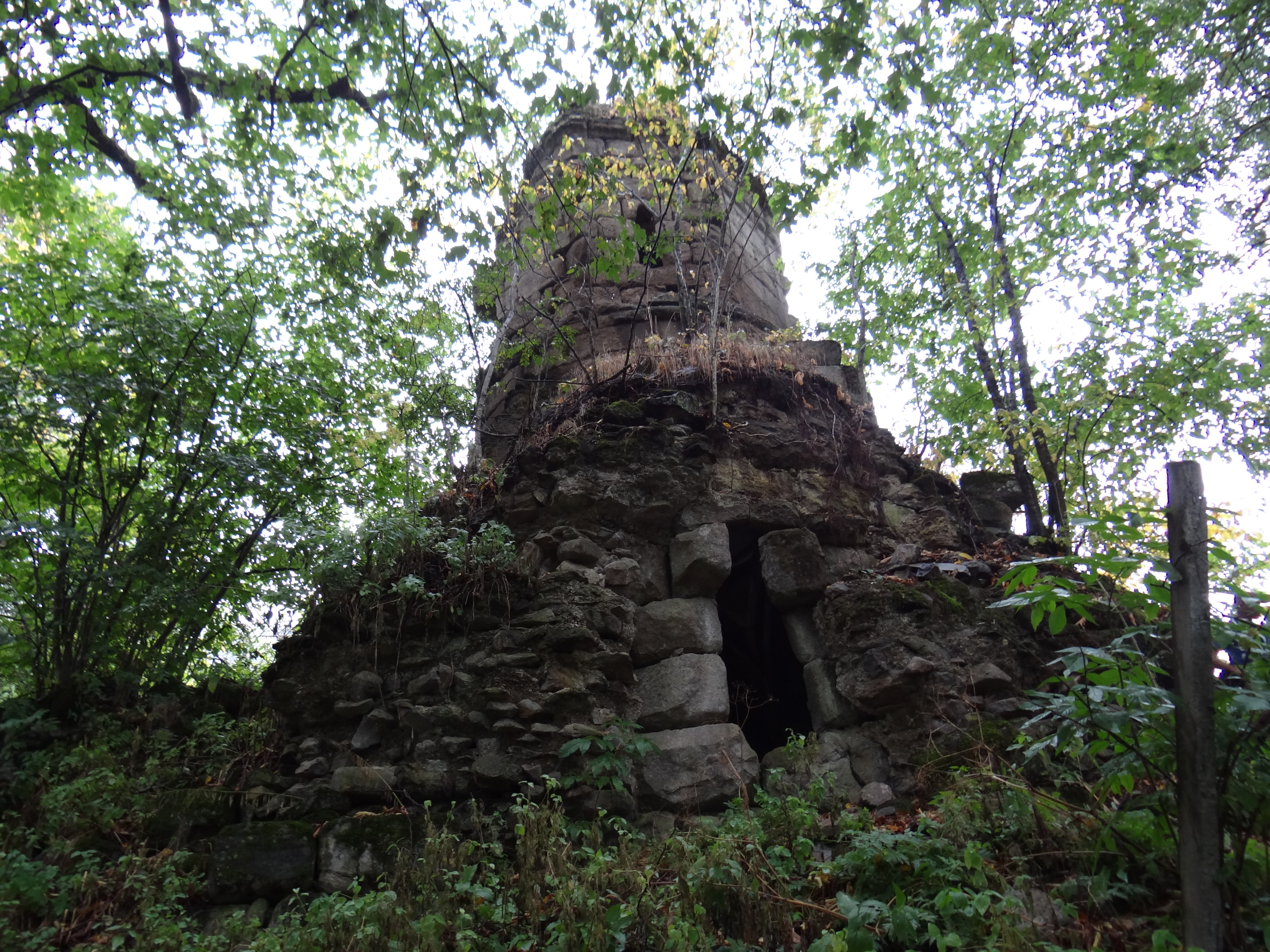

- Location within Armenia Location within Tavush

Religion
- Affiliation: Armenian Apostolic Church

Location
- Location: Tavush Province, Armenia
- Coordinates: 40.9747°N 45.0364°E

Architecture
- Style: Armenian
- Completed: 12th-13th centuries
- Dome: 1 intact on one of the churches.

Samsonavank Monastery (Armenian: Սամսոնավանք) is a 12th–13th century monastery easiest reached via Yenokavan in the Tavush Province of northern Armenia. It is a small monastic complex that is located in a forested area along the slopes of a mountain approximately 6 km to the south of Deghdznuti Vank of the 13th century and not far from the medieval fort of Berdakar.

== Complex ==
The site consists of a small domed 12th- or 13th-century church, a shrine, and another small church. Finished stones used in the construction of Samsoni Vank have eroded due to rain.
