= Tevrakar Castle =

Armenian castle

Tevrakar Castle is located in Armenia's Tavush region, in the village of Tevrakar Getahovit. The castle was discovered by Hakob Simonyan and Simon Hmayakyan in September 2006. An examination of material collected at Tevrakar dates to between the 5th and 7th centuries BC.

The castle is not located on a peninsula, but is impregnable on three sides because of the utilization of natural rock formations. The south-facing wall, initially constructed of stone, is damaged, but has been partially reconstructed with brick. The castle interior is accessible where the newer brickwork and older stonework meet; another opening on the southwest side of the castle is located in a wall built of limestone.

Tevrakar Castle is the only castle accessible in the region that was built with abnormally large stonework. It was constructed in the "Urartakannerin" style.
