= Khachardzan =

Village in Tavush, Armenia

Khachardzan Խաչարձան
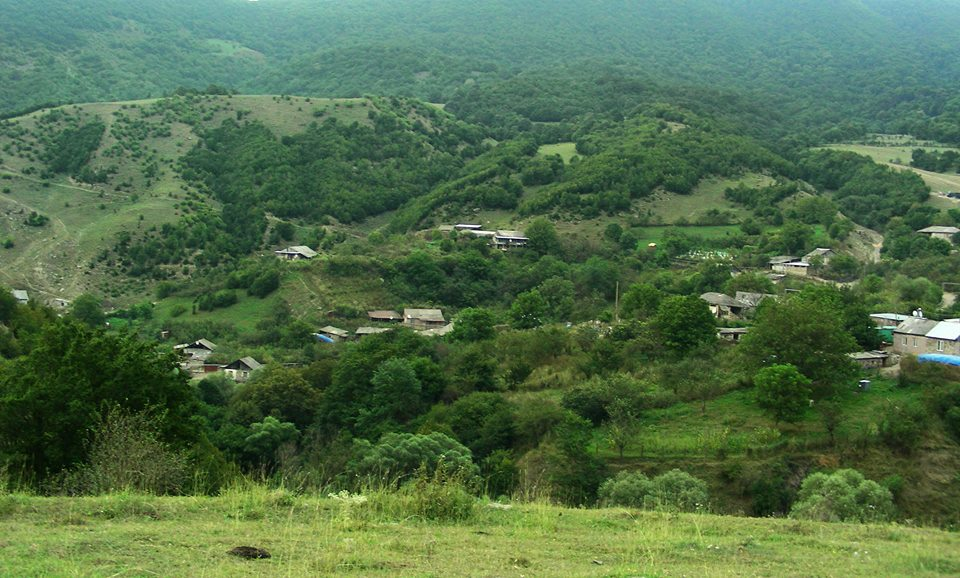
- A view of Khachardzan

- Location within Armenia Location within Tavush
- Coordinates: 40°43′09″N 45°03′30″E
- Country: Armenia
- Province: Tavush
- Municipality: Dilijan

Population (2011)
  - Total: 360
- Time zone: UTC+4 (AMT)

Khachardzan (Armenian: Խաչարձան) is a village in the Dilijan Municipality of the Tavush Province of Armenia. Prior to the Nagorno-Karabakh conflict, the village was populated by Muslims. In 1988–1989, Armenian refugees from Azerbaijan settled in the village.

== Etymology ==
The former name of the village, Polad Ayrum reflects the presence of the Turkic Ayrum people. Khachardzan literally means cross-statue in Armenian.

== Gallery ==
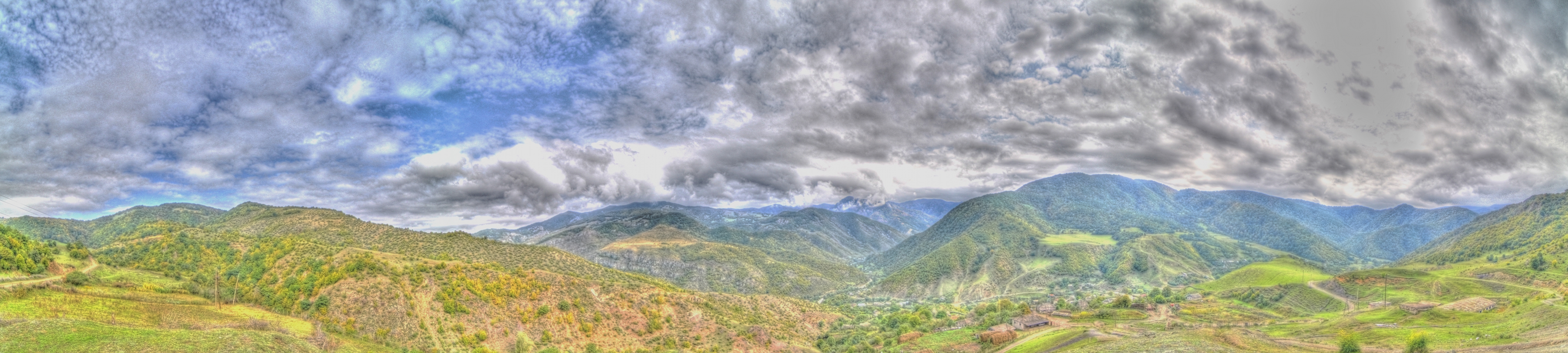
Panorama of Khachardzan and surrounding mountains

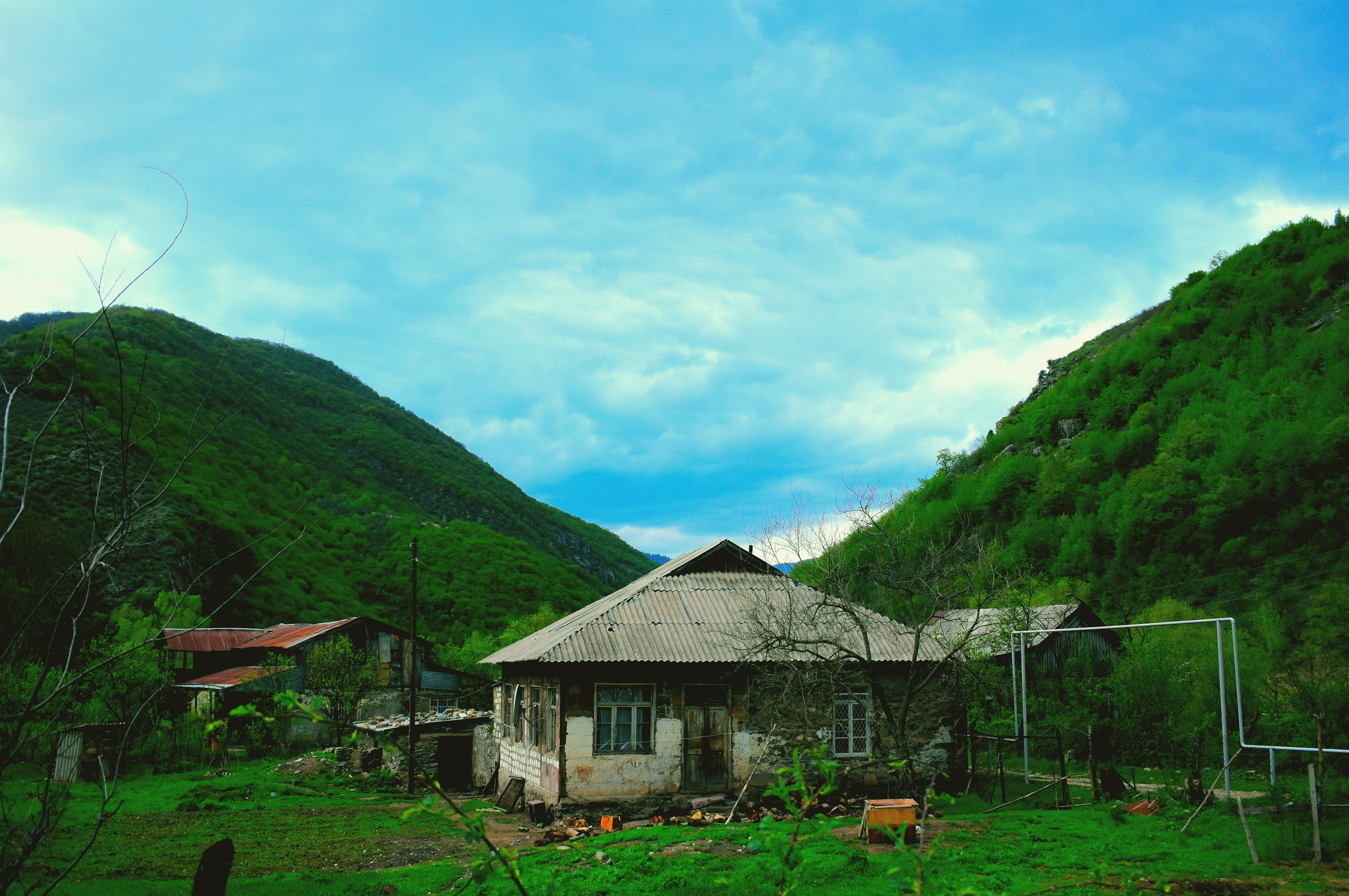
A view of the village
