= Lusadzor =

Lusadzor Լուսաձոր
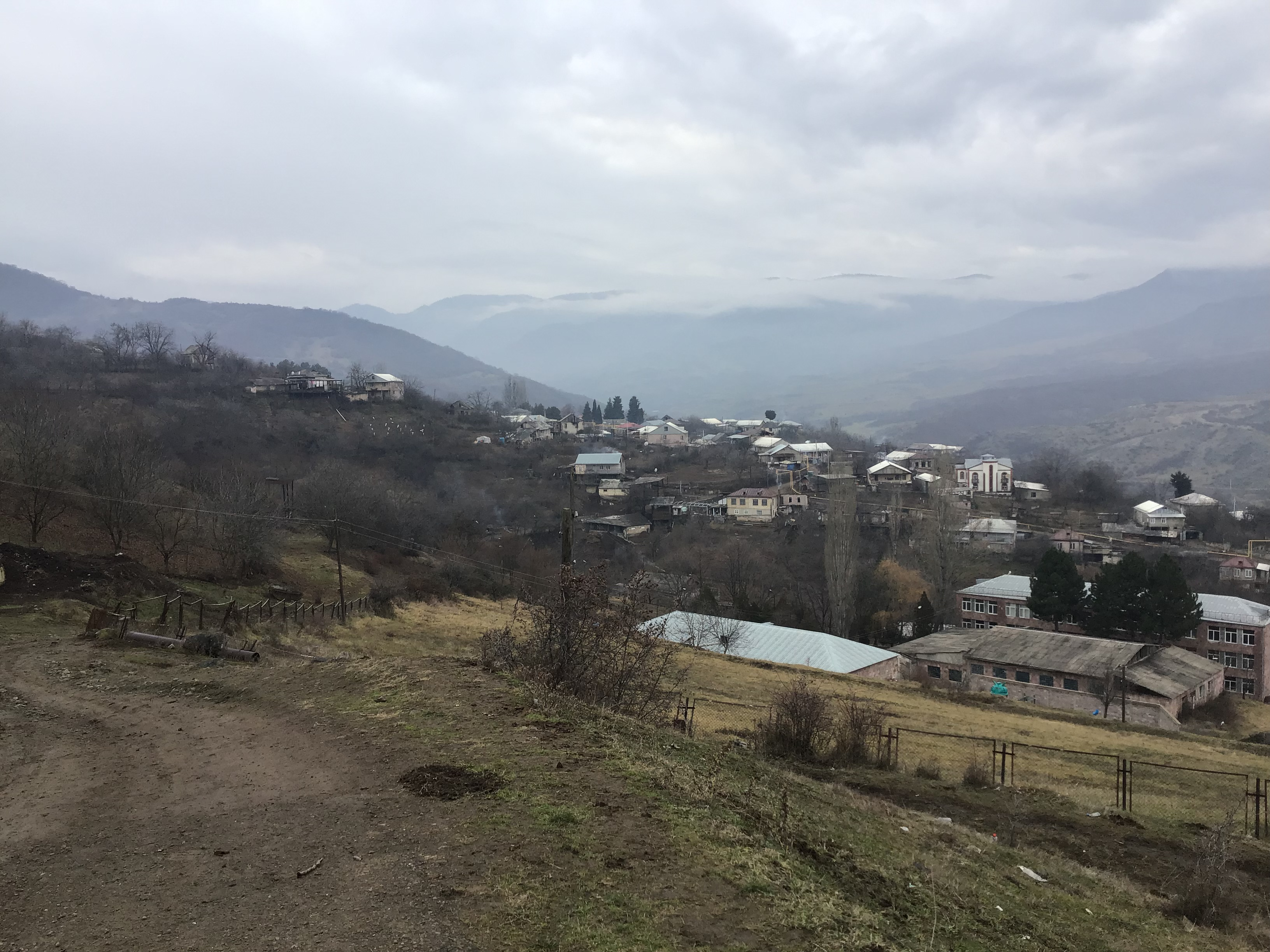
- A view of Lusadzor

- Location within Armenia Location within Tavush
- Coordinates: 40°56′N 45°08′E
- Country: Armenia
- Province: Tavush
- Municipality: Ijevan

Population (2011)
  - Total: 671
- Time zone: UTC+4 (AMT)

Lusadzor (Armenian: Լուսաձոր) is a village in the Ijevan Municipality of the Tavush Province of Armenia.

== Toponymy ==
The village was previously known as Khavaradzor and Karanlukhdara.

== Gallery ==
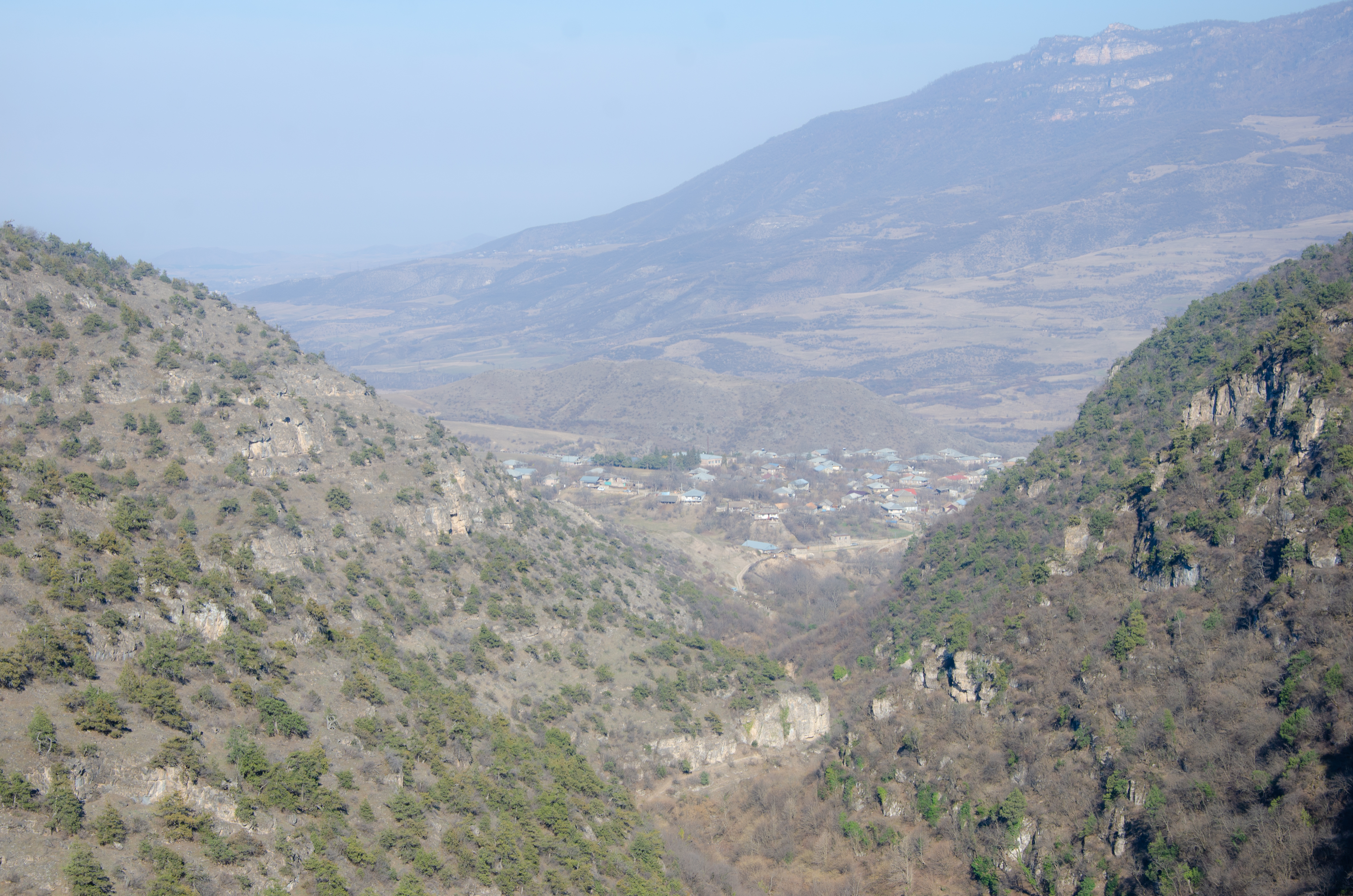
Scenery around Lusadzor
