= Ditavan =

Ditavan Դիտավան
- Location within Armenia Location within Tavush
- Coordinates: 40°57′32″N 45°12′07″E
- Country: Armenia
- Province: Tavush
- Municipality: Ijevan
- Elevation: 770 m (2,530 ft)

Population (2011)
  - Total: 348
- Time zone: UTC+4 (AMT)

Ditavan (Armenian: Դիտավան) is a village in the Ijevan Municipality of the Tavush Province of Armenia.

== Toponymy ==
The village was previously located within the former Ijevan District and was known as Revazlu or Revaz. It was renamed Ditavan on May 25, 1967.
