= Golovino =

- Location within Armenia Location within Tavush
- Coordinates: 40°42′47″N 44°50′58″E
- Country: Armenia
- Marz (Province): Tavush
- Time zone: UTC+4
  - Summer (DST): UTC+5 ( )

Golovino is a town in the Tavush Province of Armenia.
