= Tavush Province =

Province of Armenia

Tavush Տավուշ
- Province
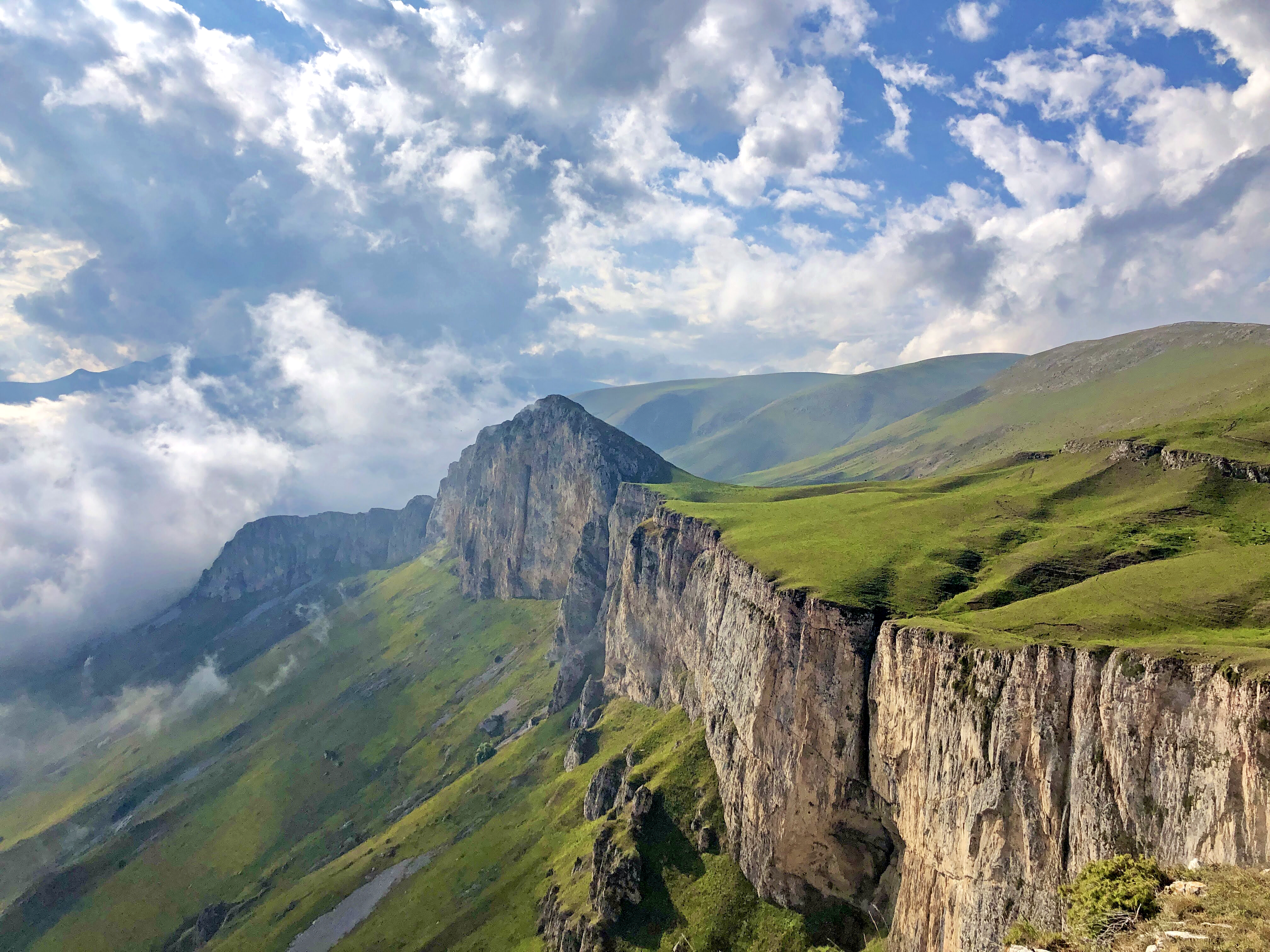
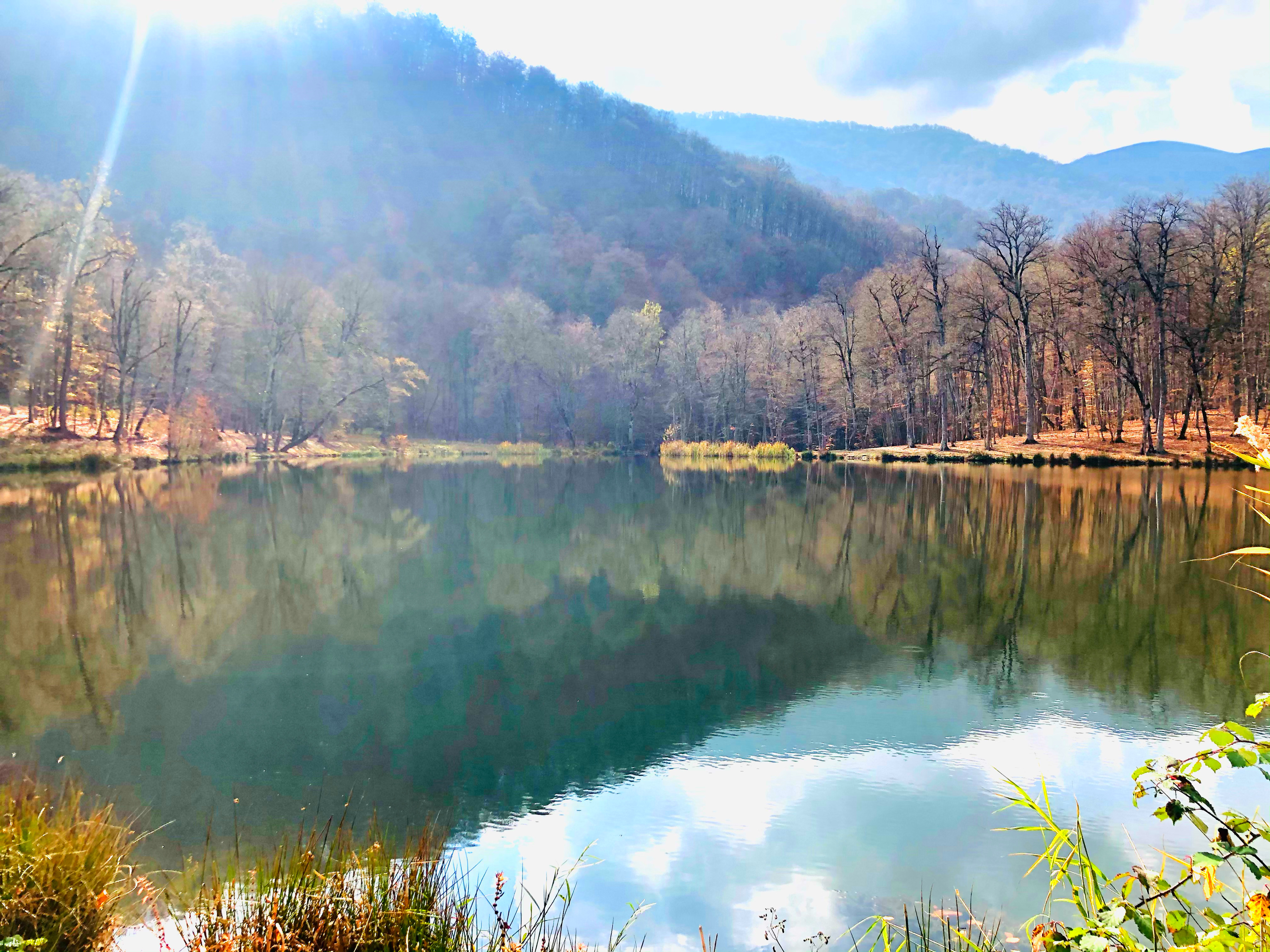
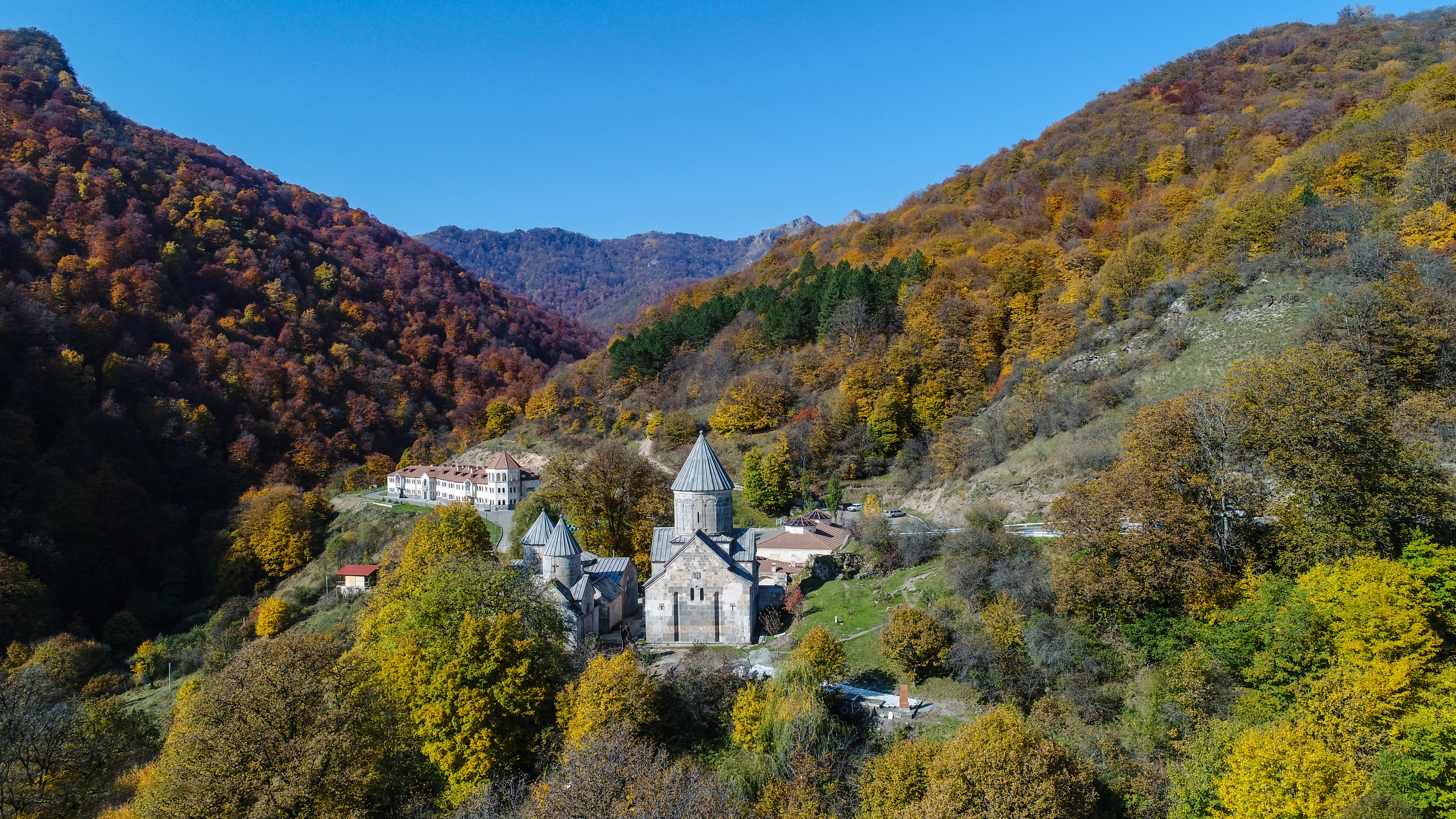
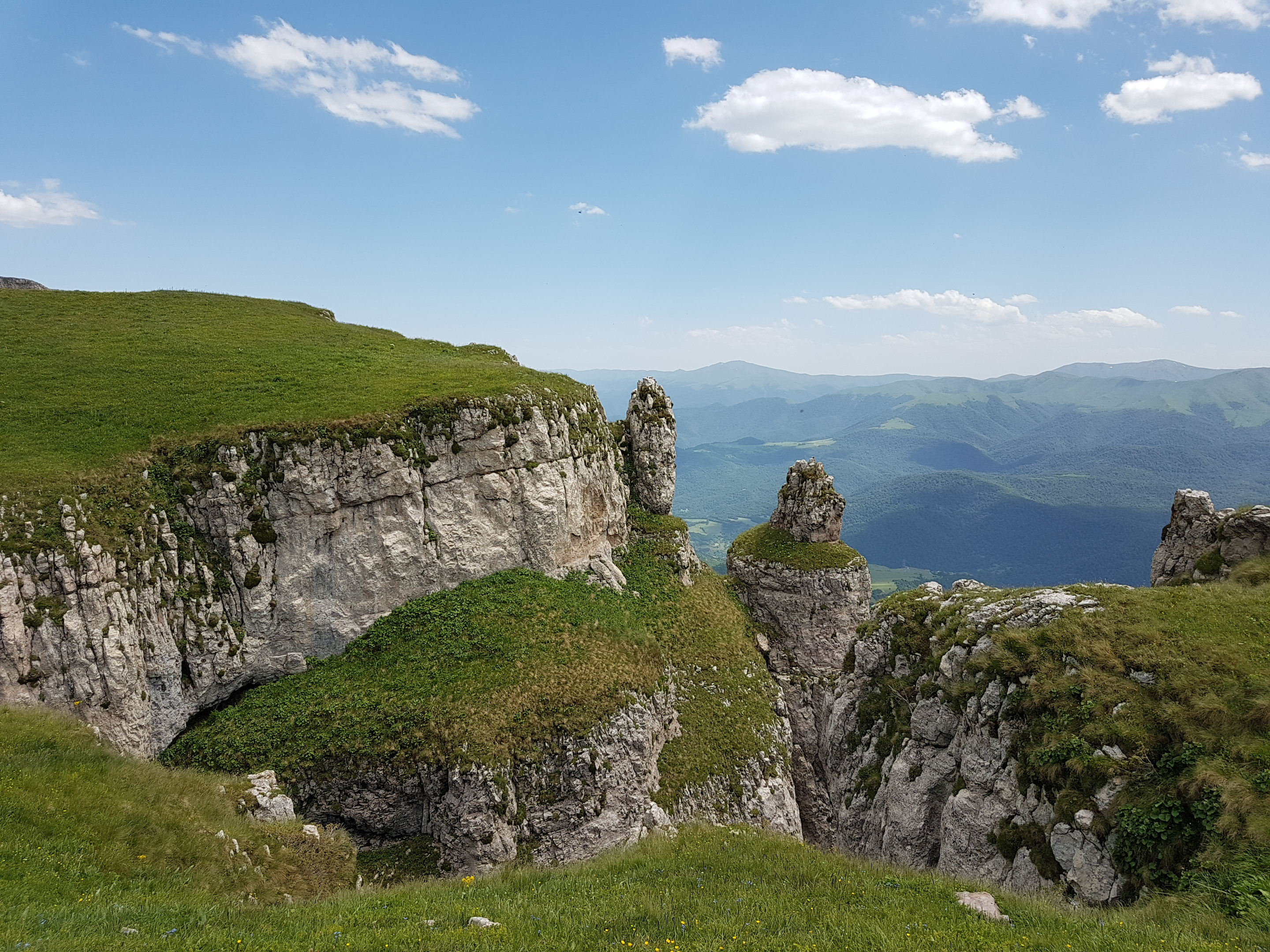
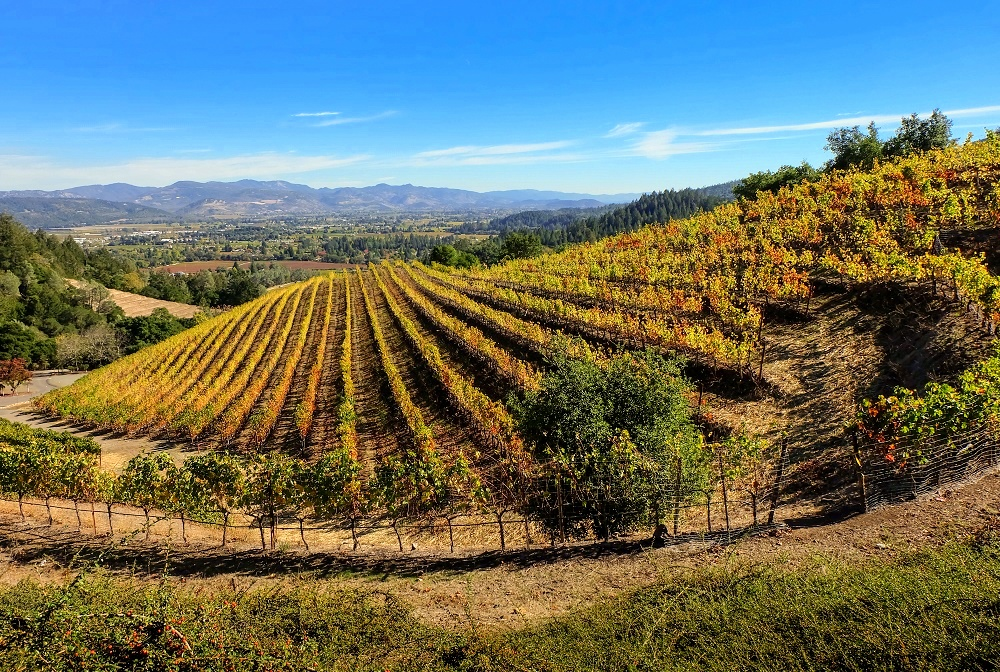
- From the top to bottom-right: Mount Dimats, Gosh Lake, Haghartsin Monastery, Dilijan National Park, Ijevan Vineyard

- Coordinates: 40°53′N 45°8′E
- Country: Armenia
- Capital and largest city: Ijevan

Government
  - Governor: Hayk Ghalumyan

Area
  - Total: 2,704 km^{2} (1,044 sq mi)
  - Rank: 4th

Population (2022)
  - Total: 114,940
  - Rank: 9th
  - Density: 42.51/km^{2} (110.1/sq mi)

GDP
  - Total: ֏ 118.657 billion (US$ 246 million)
  - Per capita: ֏ 956,908 (US$ 1,984)
- Time zone: UTC+04
- Postal code: 3901–4216
- ISO 3166 code: AM.TV
- FIPS 10-4: AM09
- HDI (2022): 0.773 high · 6th
- Website: Official website

Tavush (Armenian: Տավուշ, (Note: Classical spelling: Տաւուշ) Armenian pronunciation: [tɑˈvuʃ]) is a province of Armenia located at the northeast of Armenia, bordered by Georgia from the north and Azerbaijan from the east. Internally, Tavush borders the Gegharkunik Province from the south, Kotayk Province from the southwest, and the Lori Province from west. The capital and largest city of the province is the town of Ijevan.

== Etymology ==
The name of the province is derived from Tavush; a variant of the original name of the Tuchkatak canton of the historical Utik province of Ancient Armenia. It first appeared during the 9th century as the name of the 9th-century Bagratid fortress near modern-day Berd.

== Geography ==
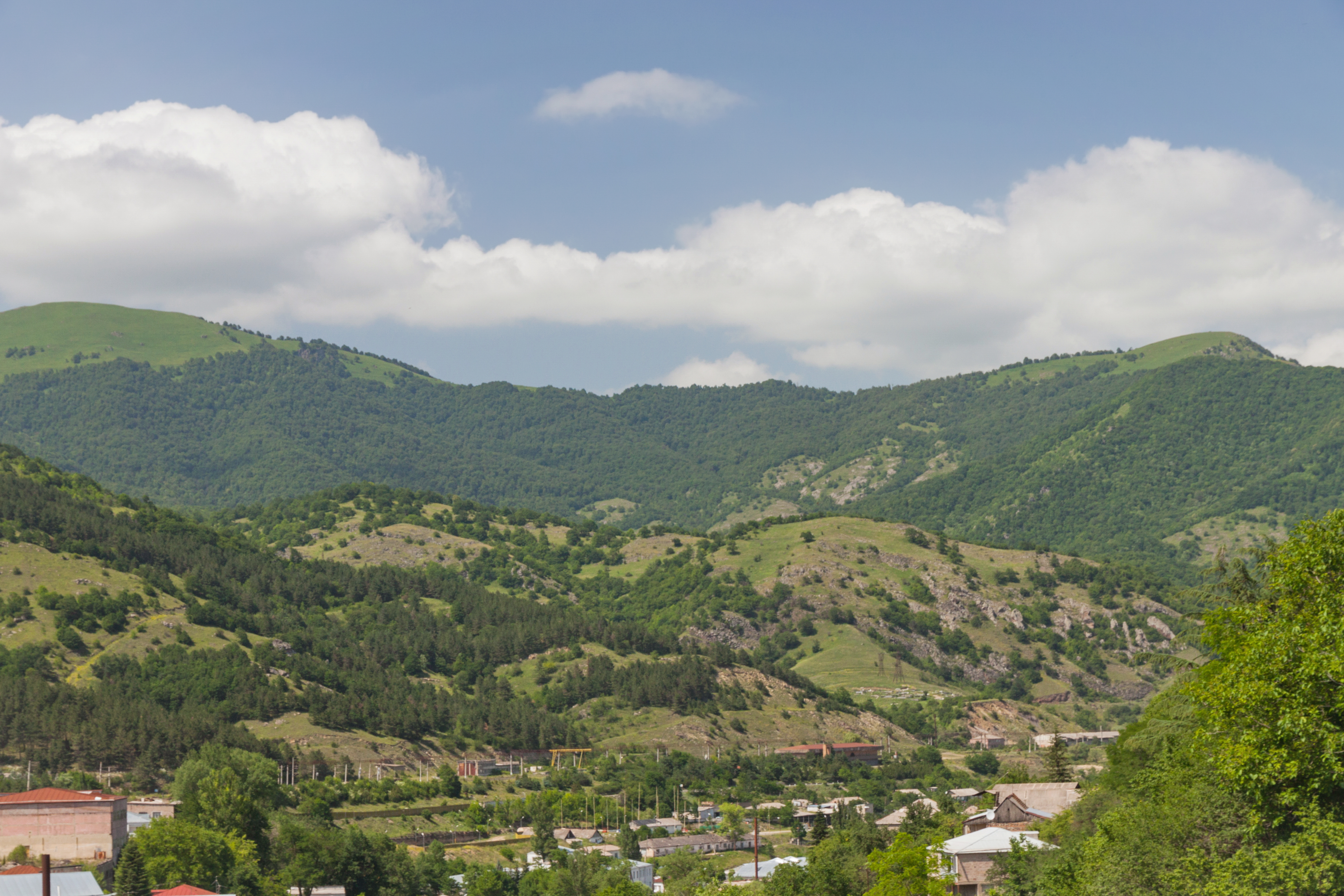
The Lesser Caucasus

Tavush has an area of 2,704 km^{2} (9% of total area of Armenia). It occupies the northeastern part of Armenia. It is bordered by Georgia to the north and Azerbaijan to the east. Domestically, it is bordered by the Gegharkunik Province from the south, Kotayk Province from the southwest and Lori Province from west. The territory is mainly mountainous and rocky hillsides covered with a green carpet of Alpine meadows. Tavush is sometimes referred to as a little Armenian Switzerland. The average height of the region is around 900 meters above sea level.

Based on the historical divisions of Ancient Armenia, the current territory of the province occupies parts of the Varazhnunik canton of Ayrarat province, the Dzorapor and Koghbapor cantons of Gugark province, and the Aghve and Tuchkatak (Tavush) cantons of Utik province.

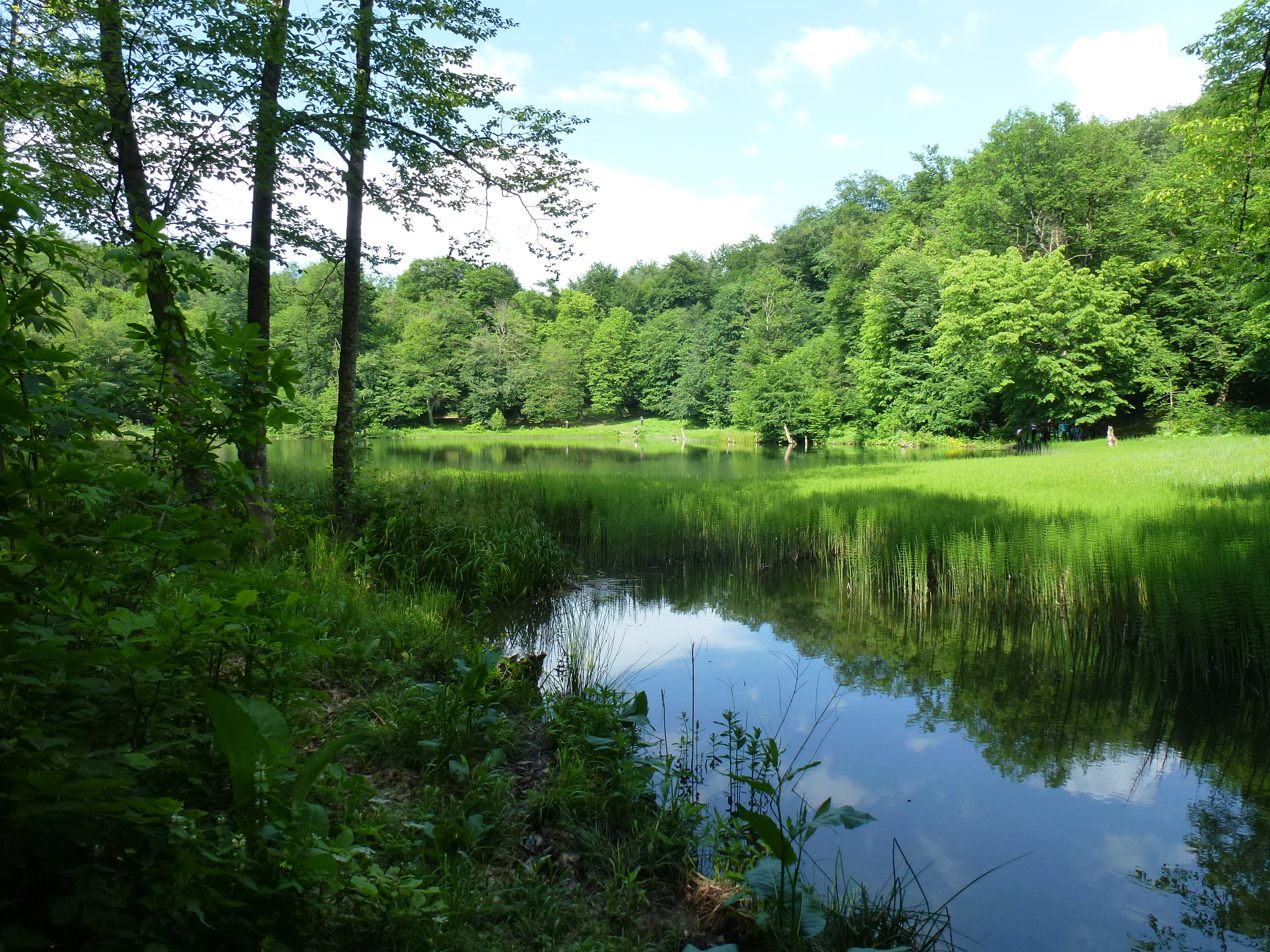
Lake Gosh

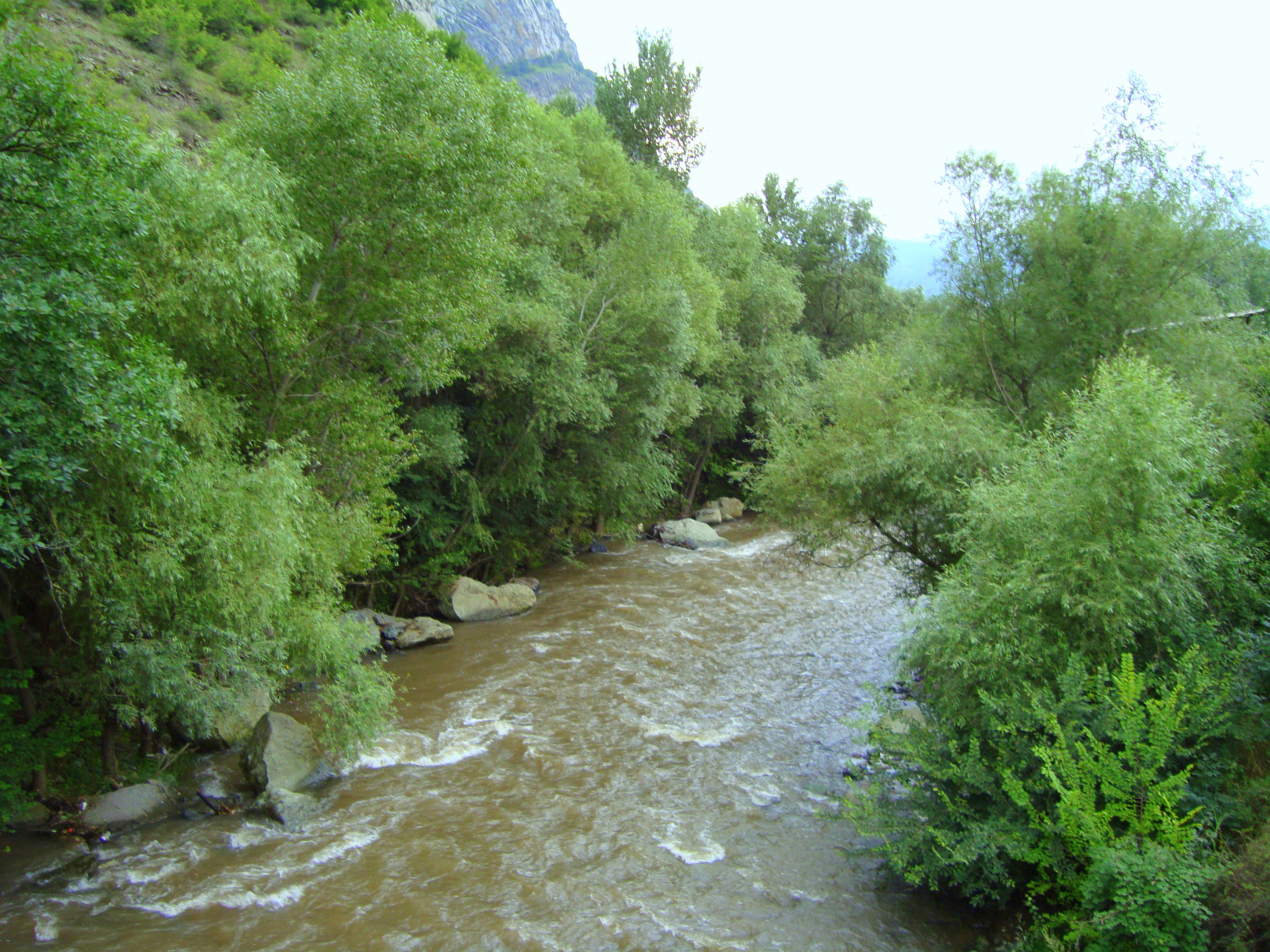
Aghstev river

The province entirely lies among the mountains of the Lesser Caucasus. It is surrounded by the Miapor mountains from the east, the Somkheti mountains from the north, the Gugark mountains from the east and the Kenats mountains from the south. The highest point of Tavush is the Miapor peak with a height of 2993 meters, while the lowest point is located at a height of 380 meters in the Debed river valley near the village of Debedavan.

The province is a major source of water in Armenia. The main source is Aghstev river with its tributaries Getik, Voskepar and Sarnajur. Minor rivers include Akhum, Tavush and Khndzorut.

Tavush is also rich for its mountain springs, mineral water and small lakes such as the Lake Parz and Lake Gosh.

Most of the Tavush territory is covered with thick forests, mainly around the towns of Dilijan, Ijevan and Berd. The province has a number of protected forests including the Dilijan National Park, Akhnabad Taxus Grove Sanctuary, Arjatkhelni Hazel Sanctuary, Gandzakar Sanctuary, Ijevan Sanctuary and Zikatar Sanctuary.

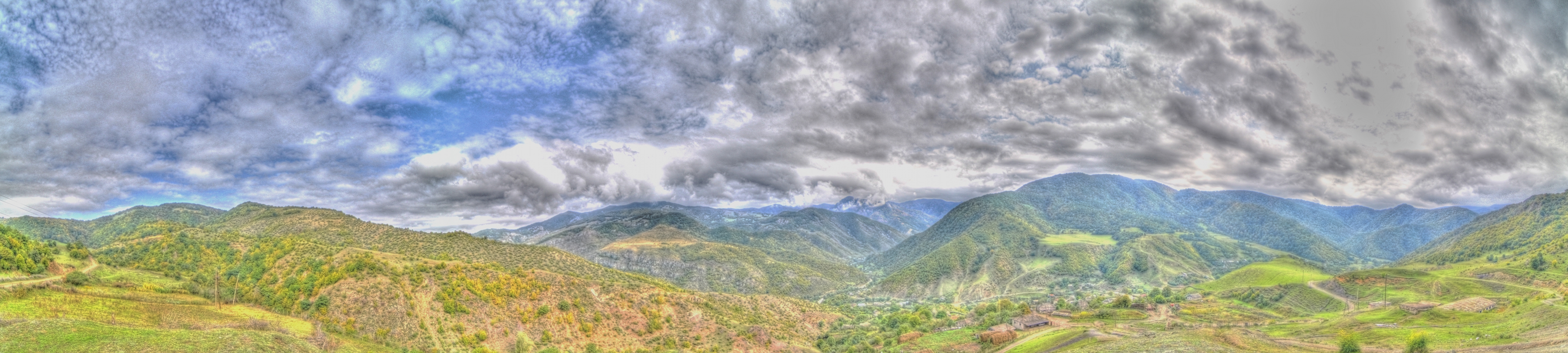
Kenats mountains at the south of Tavush

== History ==
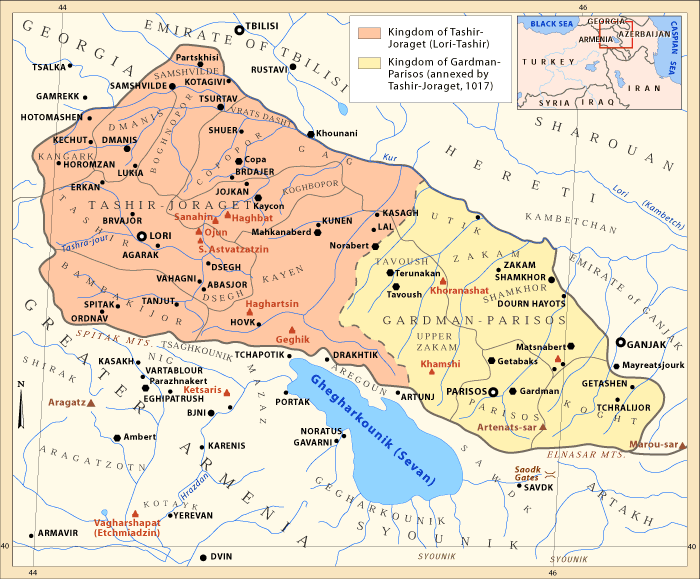
Kingdom of Tashir-Dzoraget

The territories of present-day Lori and Tavush along with the neighboring Georgia, became part of the Russian Empire in 1800–01. The territories became an official region of Russia as per the Treaty of Gulistan signed between Imperial Russia and Qajar Persia in October 1813, following the Russo-Persian War of 1804–13. In 1840, the Elizavetpol uezd was formed and most of the territories of Tavush were included in this new administrative division of the Russian Empire. Later in 1868, the Elisabethpol Governorate was established and Tavush became part of the newly formed Kazakh uezd of the governorate.

From 1930 until 1995, modern-day Tavush was divided into 3 districts within the Armenian SSR: Ijevan raion, Noyemberyan raion, and Shamshadin raion. With the territorial administration reform of 1995, the 3 raions were merged to form the Tavush Province.

In July 2020, Tavush became the main site for the clashes with Azerbaijan.

== Demographics ==
=== Population ===
According to the 1989 Soviet census, the Tavush Province (then part of the Shamshadin, Noyemberyan, and Ijevan districts in 1930–1995) had a population of 144,583. 49,114 or 33.97% of which was urban, distributed into the cities of Dilijan (30,433) and Ijevan (18,681), and 95,469 or 66.03% were rural, distributed into the districts of Shamshadin (34,559), Noyemberyan (33,973), and Ijevan (26,937).

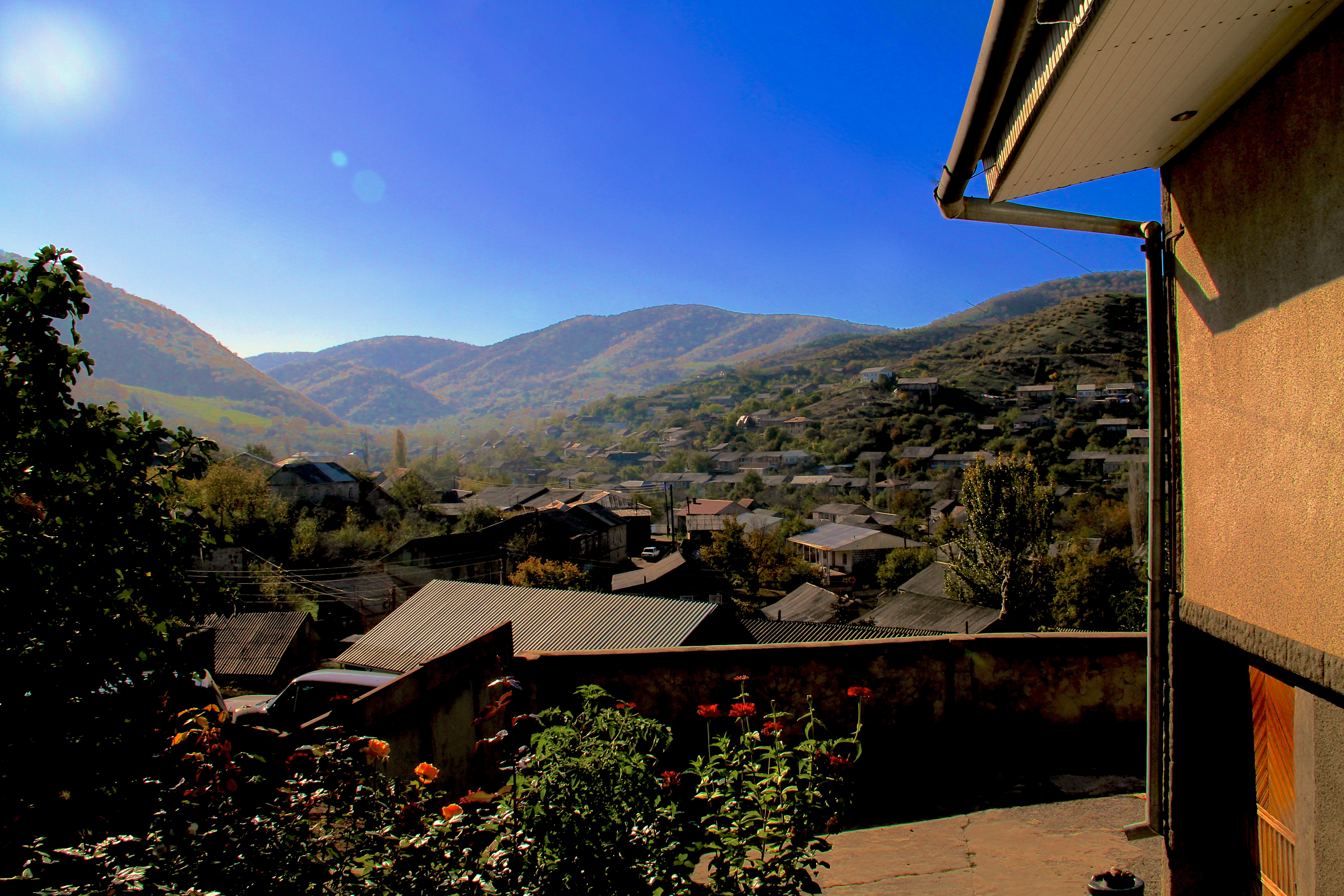
Koghb is the largest rural community of Tavush

Tavush is the second least populated province in Armenia. According to the 2011 official census, Tavush has a population of 128,609 (62,083 men and 66,526 women), forming around 4.3% of the entire population of Armenia. The urban population is 54,186 (42.1%) and the rural is 74,423 (57.9%). The province has 5 urban and 55 rural communities. The largest urban community is the provincial center of Ijevan, with a population of 21,081. The other urban centres Dilijan, Berd, Noyemberyan and Ayrum.

With a population of 4,420, the village of Koghb is the largest rural municipality of Tavush.

=== Ethnic groups and religion ===
The majority of the Tavush Province population are ethnic Armenians who belong to the Armenian Apostolic Church. The regulating body of the church is the Diocese of Tavush, headed by Bishop Bagrat Galstanyan. The Surp Nerses Cathedral in Ijevan is the seat of the diocese.

The town of Berd is home to around 200 Udis who also belong to the Armenian Church.

A tiny community of Yazidis is found in Dilijan.

== Administrative divisions ==
As a result of the administrative reforms that took place on 15 December 2015, 17 June 2016, 16 July 2016 and 9 June 2017, Tavush is currently divided into 24 municipal communities (hamaynkner), of which 5 are urban, and 19 are rural:

Municipality	Type	Area (km^{2})	Population (2017 est.)	Centre	Included villages
Ayrum Municipality	Urban	77	11,097	Ayrum	Archis, Bagratashen, Debetavan, Deghdzavan, Haghtanak, Lchkadzor, Ptghavan
Berd Municipality	Urban			Berd	Aygedzor, Aygepar, Artsvaberd, Chinari, Chinchin, Choratan, Itsakar, Movses, Navur, Nerkin Karmiraghbyur, Norashen, Paravakar, Tavush, Varagavan, Verin Karmiraghbyur, Verin Tsaghkavan
Dilijan Municipality	Urban			Dilijan	Aghavnavank, Gosh, Haghartsin, Hovk, Teghut, Khachardzan
Ijevan Municipality	Urban	43	18,960	Ijevan	
Noyemberyan Municipality	Urban	154.5	16,782	Noyemberyan	Baghanis, Barekamavan, Berdavan, Dovegh, Jujevan, Koti, Voskepar, Voskevan
Achajur Municipality	Rural	30	4,463	Achajur	
Acharkut Municipality	Rural	0.2	177	Acharkut	
Aknaghbyur Municipality	Rural	6	521	Aknaghbyur	
Aygehovit Municipality	Rural	21	3,591	Aygehovit	Kayan
Azatamut Municipality	Rural	0.5	3182	Azatamut	
Berkaber Municipality	Rural	12	552	Berkaber	
Ditavan Municipality	Rural	8	391	Ditavan	
Gandzakar Municipality	Rural	34	3,639	Gandzakar	
Getahovit Municipality	Rural	8.5	2,265	Getahovit	
Khashtarak Municipality	Rural	18.5	1869	Khashtarak	
Kirants Municipality	Rural	6	392	Kirants	
Koghb Municipality	Rural	67	5,970	Koghb	Zorakan
Lusadzor Municipality	Rural	6.5	686	Lusadzor	
Lusahovit Municipality	Rural	5	333	Lusahovit	
Nerkin Tsaghkavan Municipality	Rural	9	618	Nerkin Tsaghkavan	
Sarigyugh Municipality	Rural	14	1,359	Sarigyugh	
Sevkar Municipality	Rural	47	2,307	Sevkar	
Vazashen Municipality	Rural	17	887	Vazashen	
Yenokavan Municipality	Rural	15.5	537	Yenokavan	

During recent years, many rural settlements in Tavush have been abandoned, including the villages of Chermakavan, Chirchiri, Geghatap, Gomer, Shamakhyan and Tarsachay.

== Culture ==
=== Fortresses and archaeological sites ===
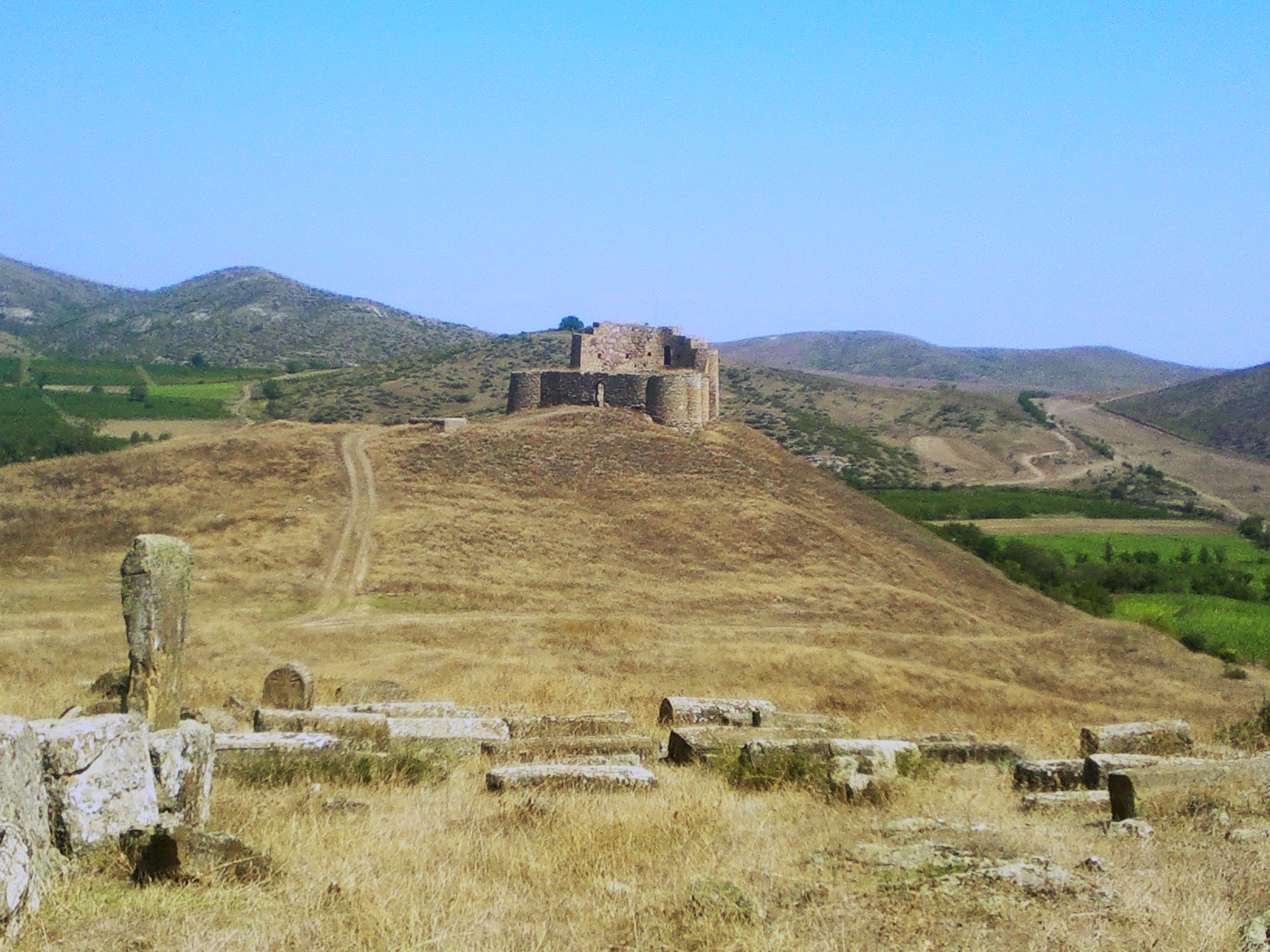
Berdavan Fortress of the 10th century

- Tavush Fortress of the 10th century,
- Berdavan Fortress of the 10th century,
- Tevrakar Castle, 5th-7th centuries BC
- Aghjkaberd Fortress,
- Sranots Bridge, 13th-14th centuries.

=== Churches and monasteries ===
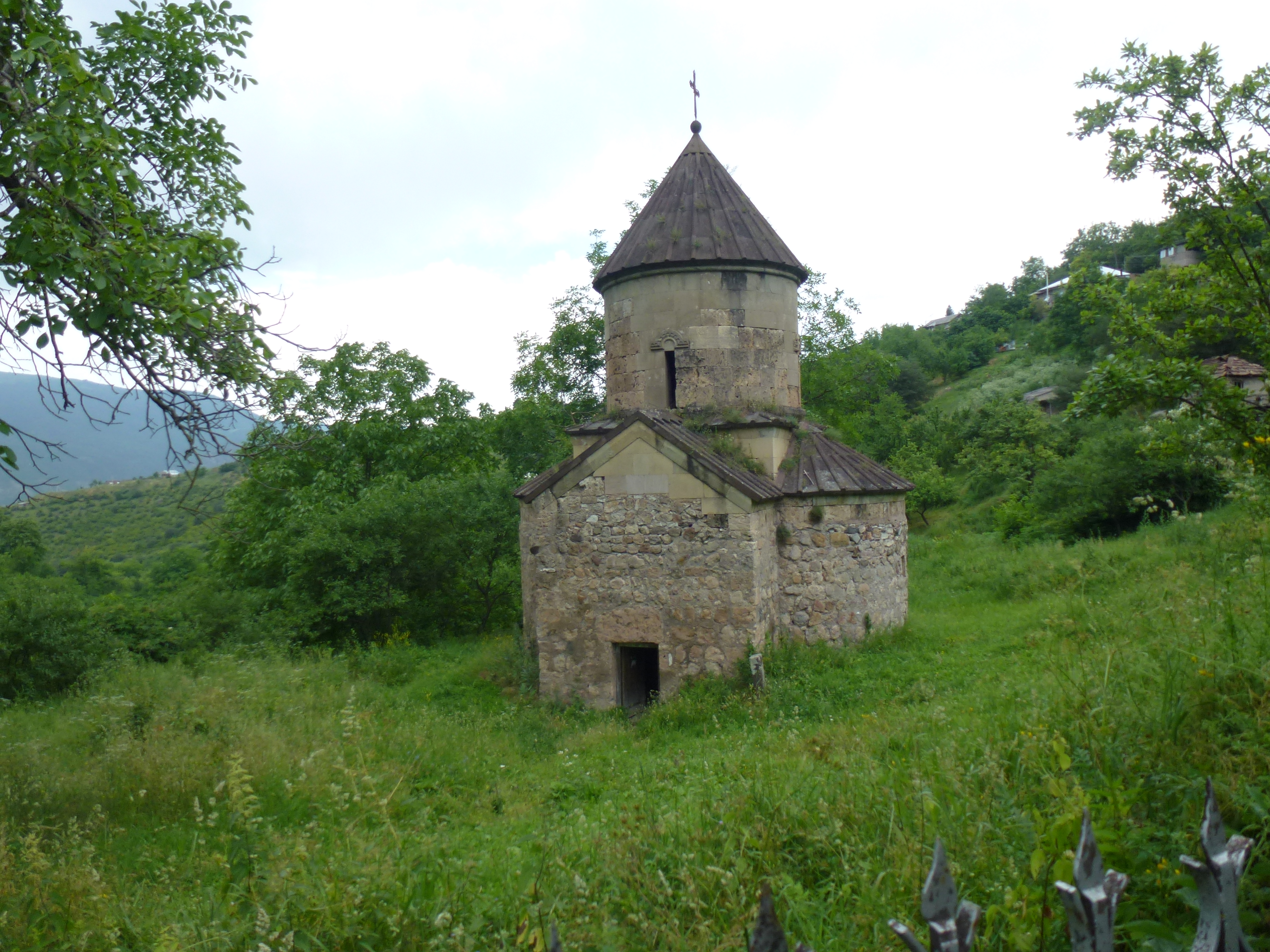
Tsrviz Chapel of the 5th century

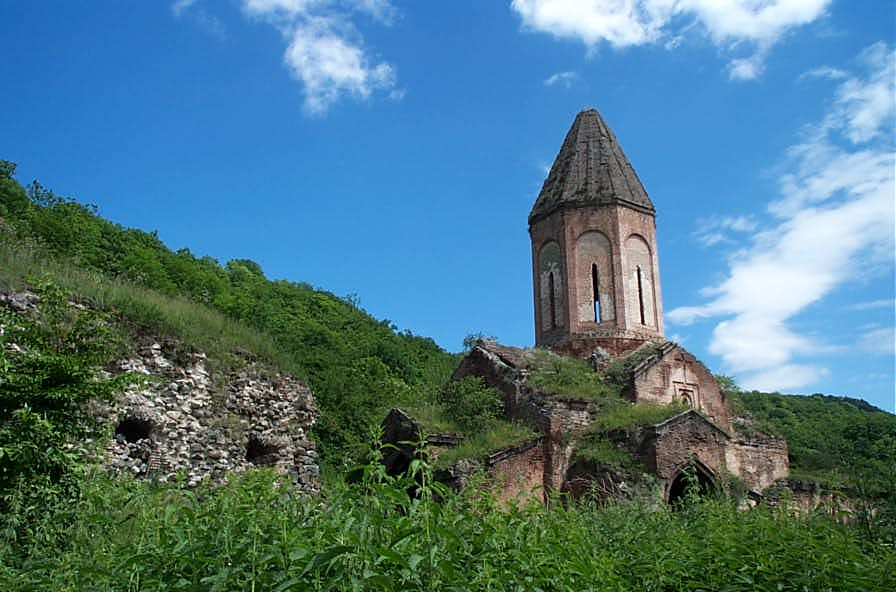
Kirants Monastery of the 8th century

- Tsrviz Chapel of the 5th century,
- Holy Mother of God Church of Voskepar of the 7th-century,
- Kirants Monastery of the 8th century,
- Makaravank monastery of the 10th century,
- Jukhtak Vank monastery of the 11th-12th centuries,
- Goshavank monastery of the 12th century,
- Aghavnavank Monastery of the 12th-13th centuries,
- Samsonavank Monastery of the 12th-13th centuries,
- Shkhmurad Monastery of the 12th-13th centuries,
- Matosavank monastery of 1247,
- Arakelots Monastery of Kirants of the 13th century,
- Haghartsin Monastery of the 13th century,
- Nor Varagavank monastery of the 13th century,
- Khoranashat Monastery of the 13th century,
- Srvegh Monastery of the 13th century.

=== Media ===
Tavush has 3 regional TV stations:

- "Ijevan TV" based in Ijevan,
- "Kamut TV" based in Noyemberyan (since 1994),
- "Tavush TV" based in Noyemberyan (since 2010).

== Economy ==
=== Agriculture ===
Tavush has a poor agricultural index with only 4.8% of share in the total annual agricultural product of Armenia. Around 41% (1,108 km^{2}) of the total area of the province are arable lands, out of which 23% (256 km^{2}) are ploughed. The population in many rural communities are mainly involved in farming, cattle-breeding and pig farming. The main crops are grains and grapes.

Recently, bee-keeping farms were also opened in many communities.

=== Industry ===
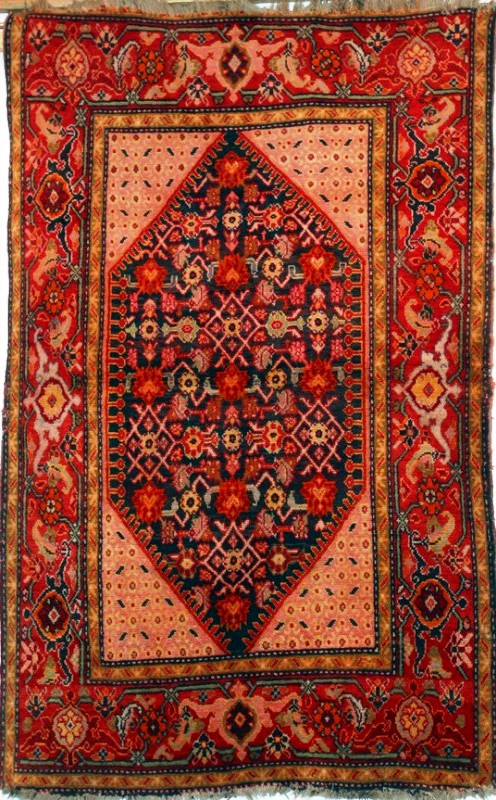
An Armenian rug from Ijevan

Tavush has the poorest industrial index among the Armenian provinces with a share of 0.8% in the annual total industrial product of Armenia. The existing industry is mainly dominated by food-processing and the production of alcoholic drinks.

- Ijevan is the economic centre of Tavush. During the Soviet period, the town had witnessed a remarkable industrial progress especially in the spheres of carpet manufacturing and wood processing. Many industrial plants of the Soviet days are still operating in Ijevan, including the "Ijevan Woodworking Enterprise" founded in 1936, the "Ijevan Wine-Brandy Factory" founded in 1951 (particularly famous for its pomegranate wine), the "Ijevan Mechanical Enterprise" founded in 1954, the "Jrashogh Ijevan Carpets" weaving mill founded in 1959, and the "Ijevan Bentonit Combine" for mining founded 1967. The Ijevan carpet weaving mill was the largest in the Caucasus and the 3rd-largest in the whole Soviet Union. The town is also famous for its handmade rugs and carpets. After the independence of Armenia, many small industrial plants were founded, including the "Karart" stone processing plant (since 2003). In 2014, the "Vector" company for software development was opened in Ijevan.
- Other major industrial plants in the province include the "Berdavan Wine Factory" in the village of Berdavan, the "Maga" food-processing factory in Varagavan and the "Vital Echogarden" food-processing factory in Aygedzor, the "Tavush Textile" factory in Choratan, the "Bavagarm" meet-processing plant in Teghut, and the "Filishin" concrete manufacturing plant in Haghartsin.
- Dilijan is famous for its mineral water, being processed and bottled by the "Dilijan Mineral Water Plant" founded in 1947. The town is also home to the "Aramara" company for fine woodworking founded in 1993, and the "Dili" factory for dairy products founded in 2005.
- The small town of Ayrum is home to the "Ayrum Cannery" (since 1937), and the "Ayrum Fruits" food-processing factory (since 2014).

=== Tourism ===
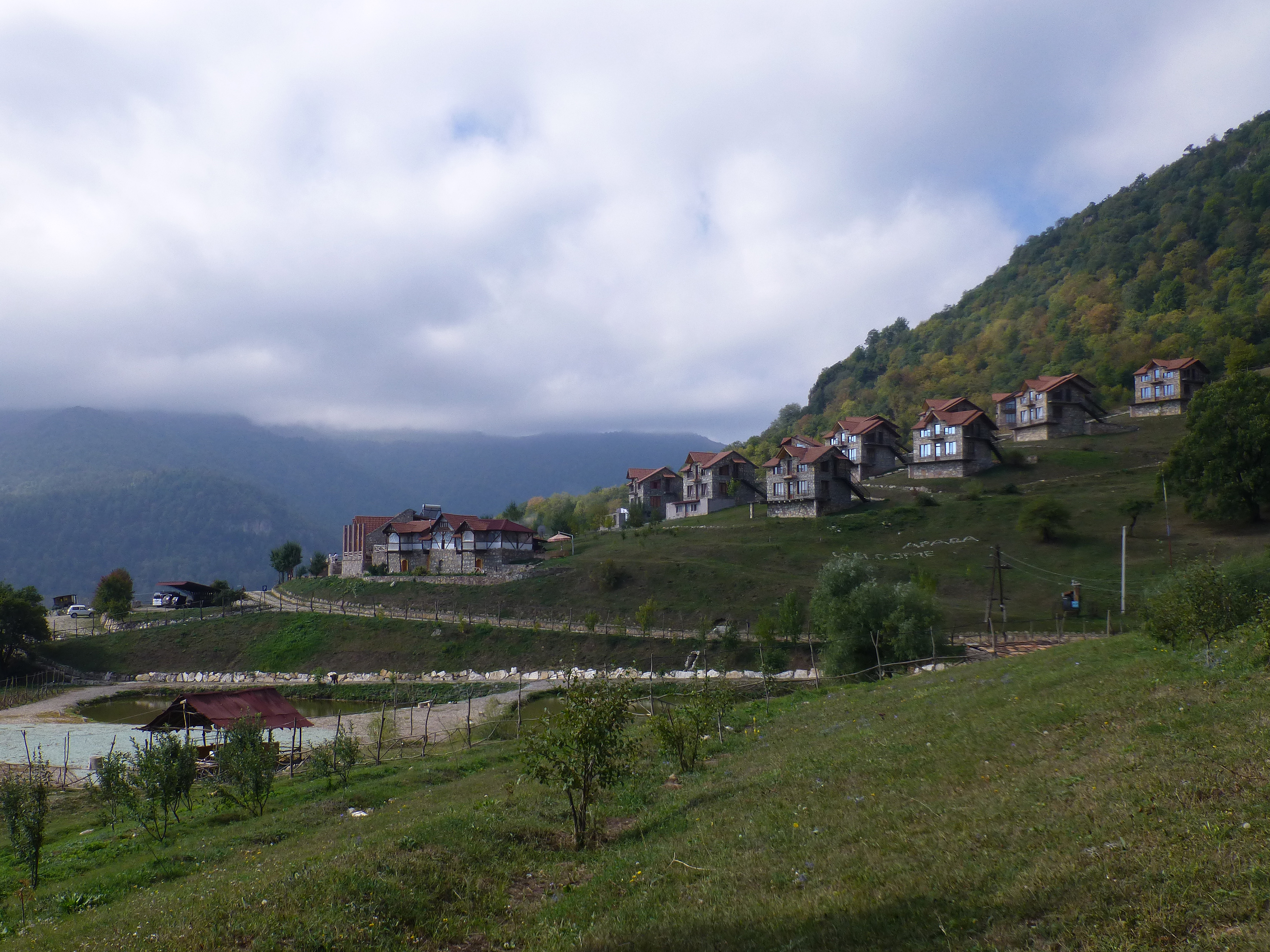
Apaga Resort in Yenokavan

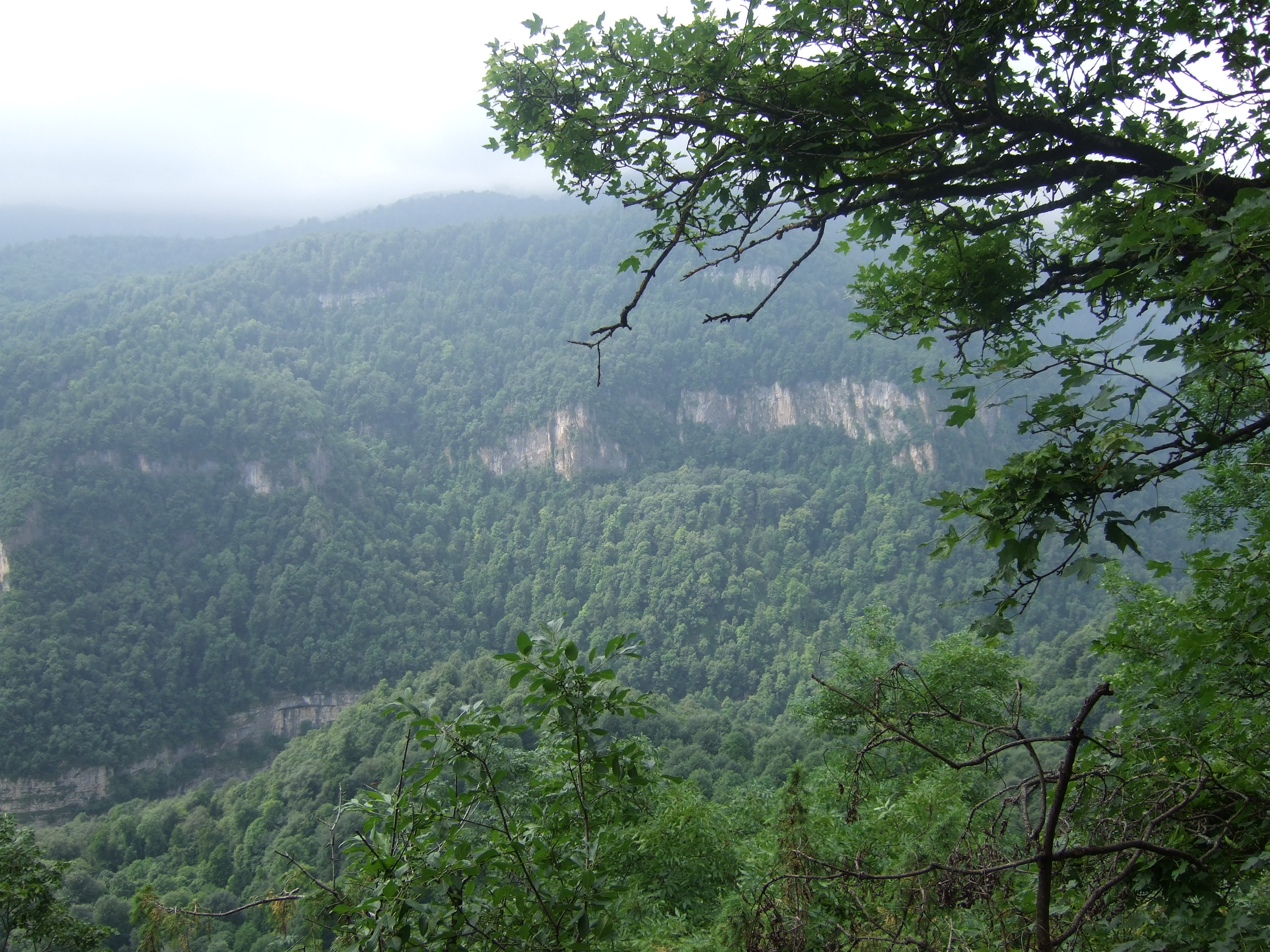
Ijevan Sanctuary

Tourism and related services are still developing in Tavush. The cultural heritage and the natural monuments of the region attract a large number of tourists.

The town of Dilijan is major touristic destination for locals and foreigners. It is also considered a financial centre as much of the Central Bank's operations was moved to Dilijan in 2013. The town is also famous with its sanatoriums and mineral water. Other touristic destinations include the villages of Achajur, Gosh, Teghut and Yenokavan.

Many forests of the province are listed among the protected areas of Armenia, including the Dilijan National Park, the Akhnabad Taxus Grove Sanctuary, the Arjatkhelni Hazel Sanctuary, the Gandzakar Sanctuary, the Ijevan Sanctuary and the Zikatar Sanctuary.

Lake Gosh, Lake Parz as well as the Ijevan Dendropark are major destinations for ecotourism.

== Education ==
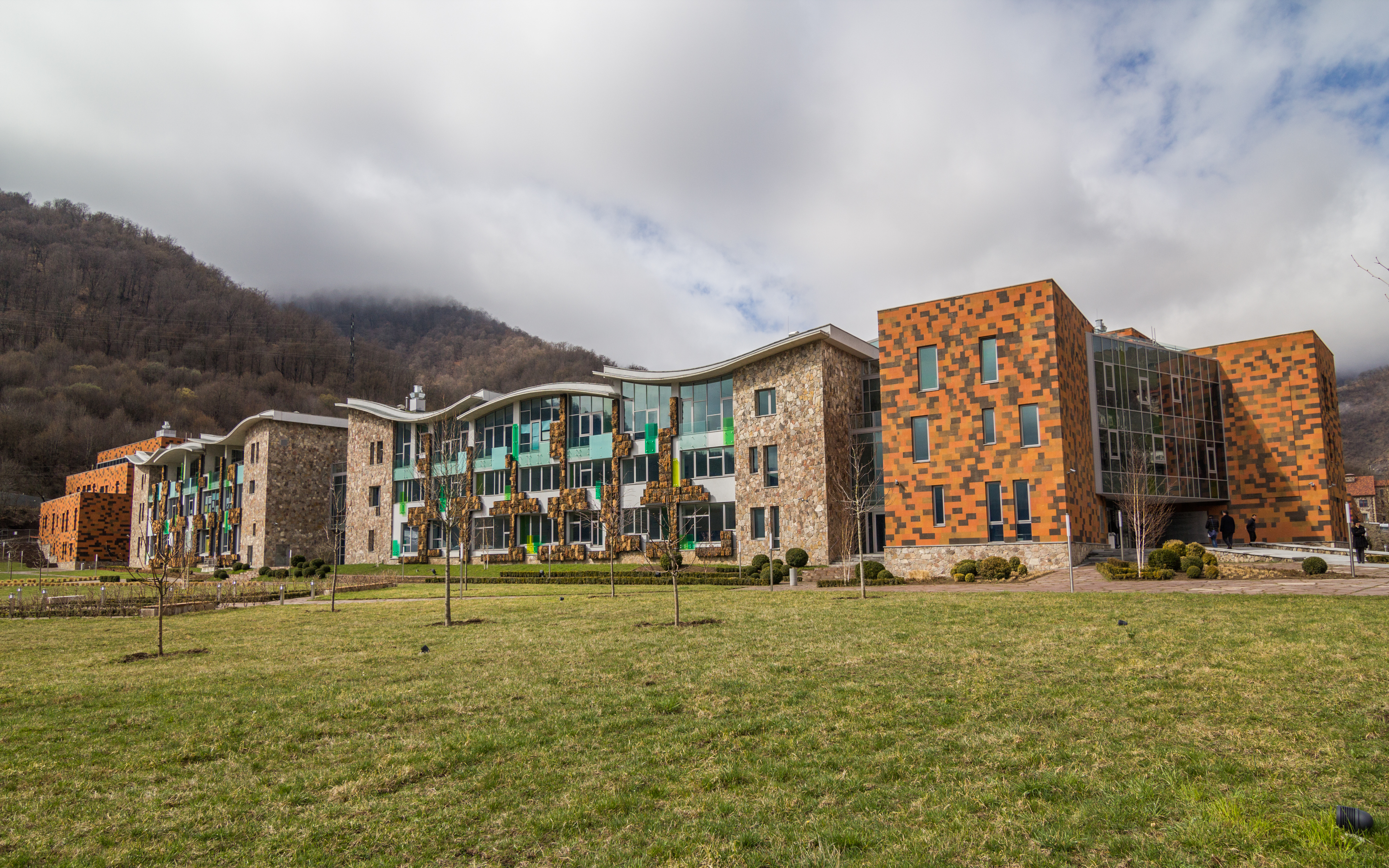
United World College Dilijan

Tavush has recently become a significant educational centre within Armenia. In 2014, the United World College Dilijan, a part of the global educational movement United World Colleges, was opened in the Dilijan.

Between 2013 and 2015, the construction of the Dilijan Central School, a branch of the Ayb Educational Foundation, was completed in Dilijan. It was officially opened in fall 2015.

Since 1994, branches of the Yerevan State University operate in Ijevan.

As of the 2015-16 educational year, Tavush has 81 schools.

== Sport ==
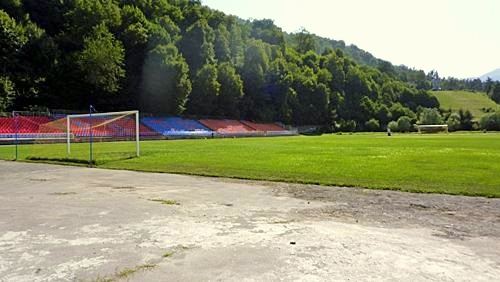
Dilijan City Stadium

Football is popular in Tavush. The province was represented in the Armenian Premier League by Impulse FC of Dilijan and FC Bentonit Ijevan. However both clubs were forced to dissolve due to financial difficulties.

Dilijan City Stadium and Arnar Stadium are the 2 largest sport venues of the province. Minor stadiums are also found in Noyemberyan and the village of Achajur.

Arnar Stadium hosted the Armenian Independence Cup final match in 2008 where Ararat Yerevan won the title defeating Banants.

Ijevan is the venue of the annual MultiForce off-road racing international competition, that attracts participants from Armenia and the neighboring countries.

== Gallery ==
Tavush

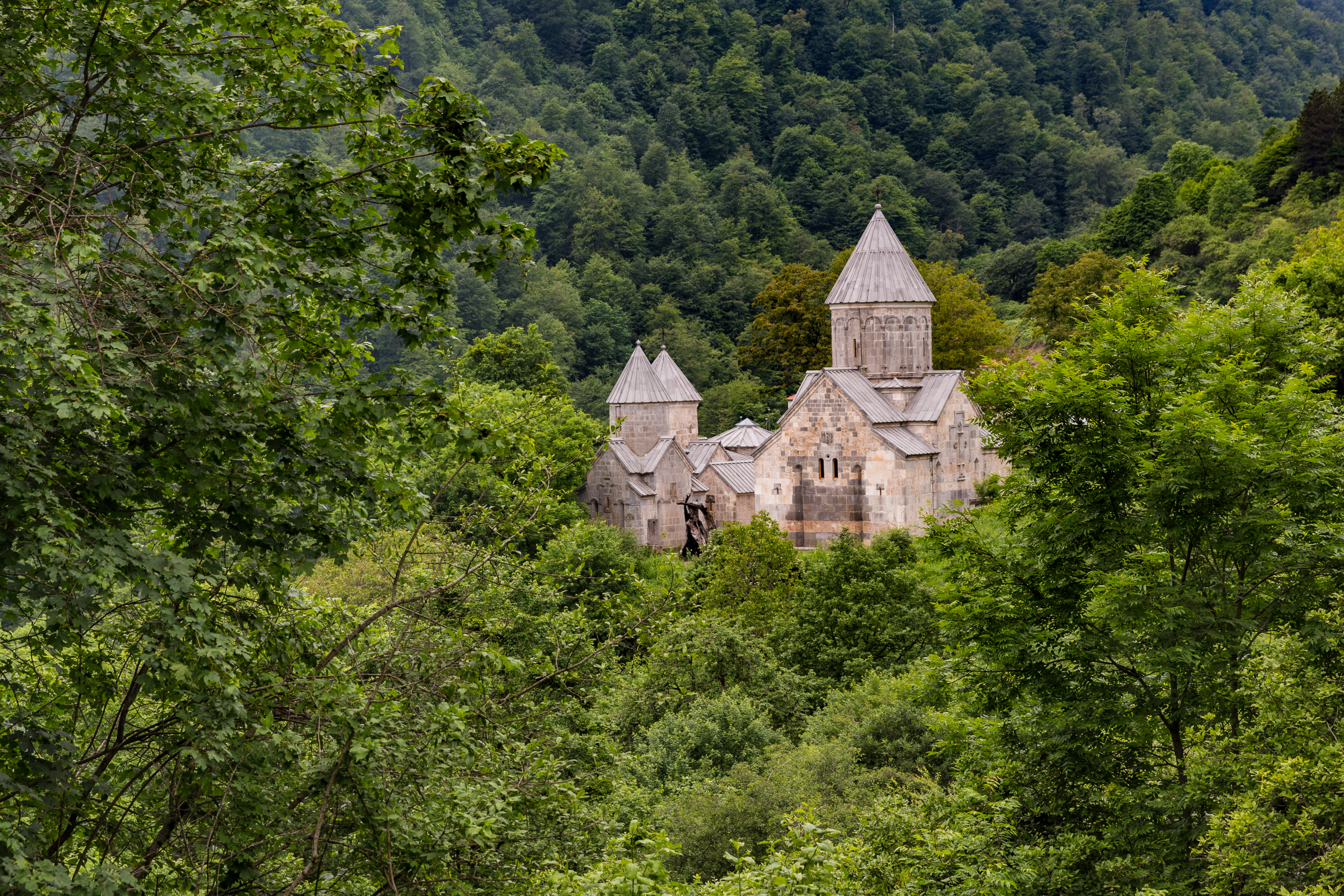
Haghartsin Monastery

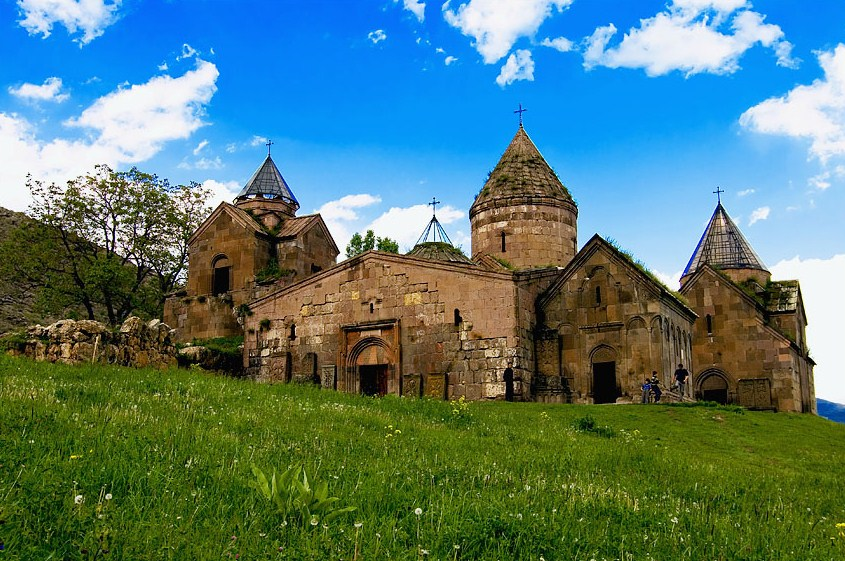
Goshavank Monastery

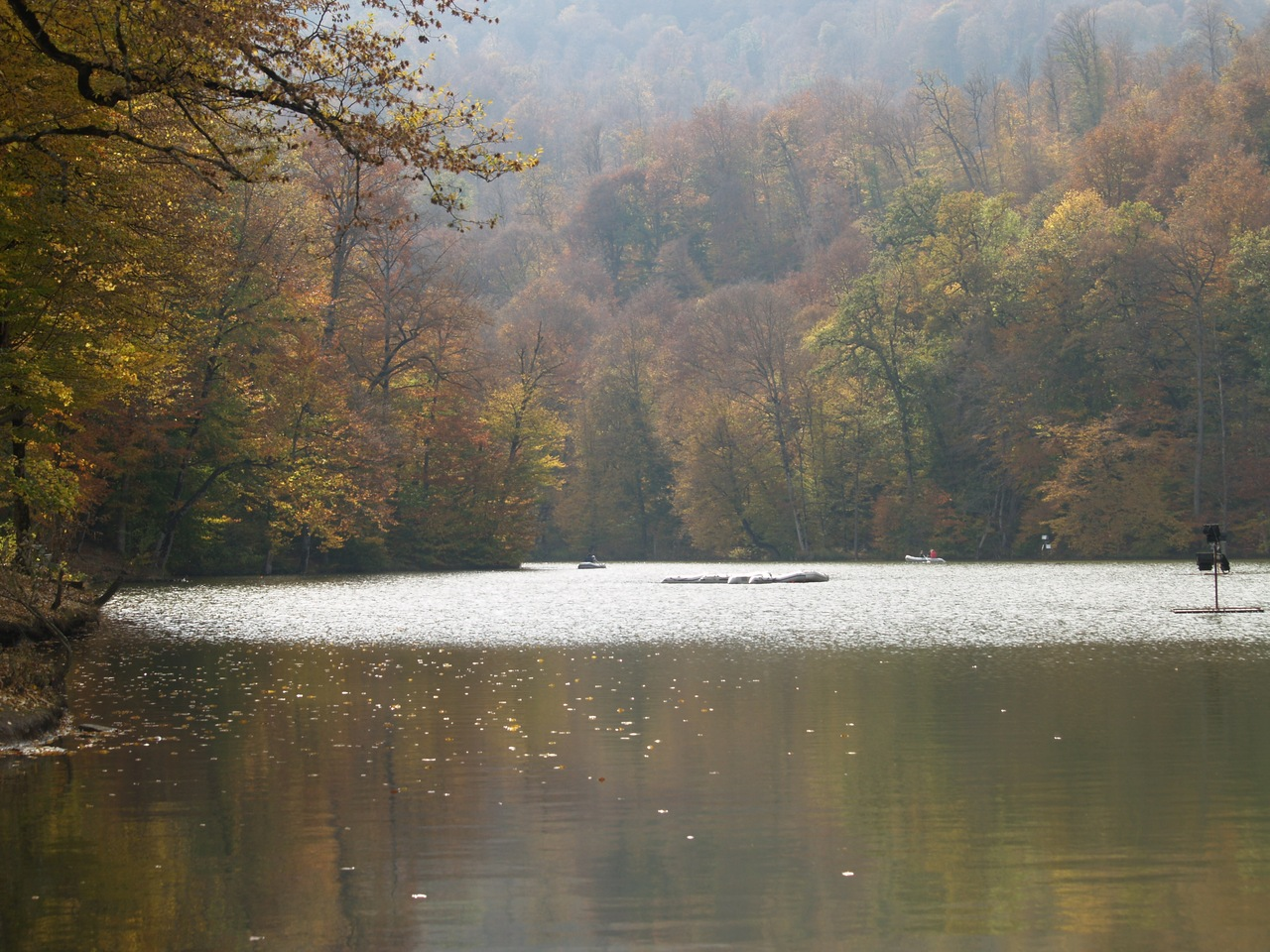
Lake Parz

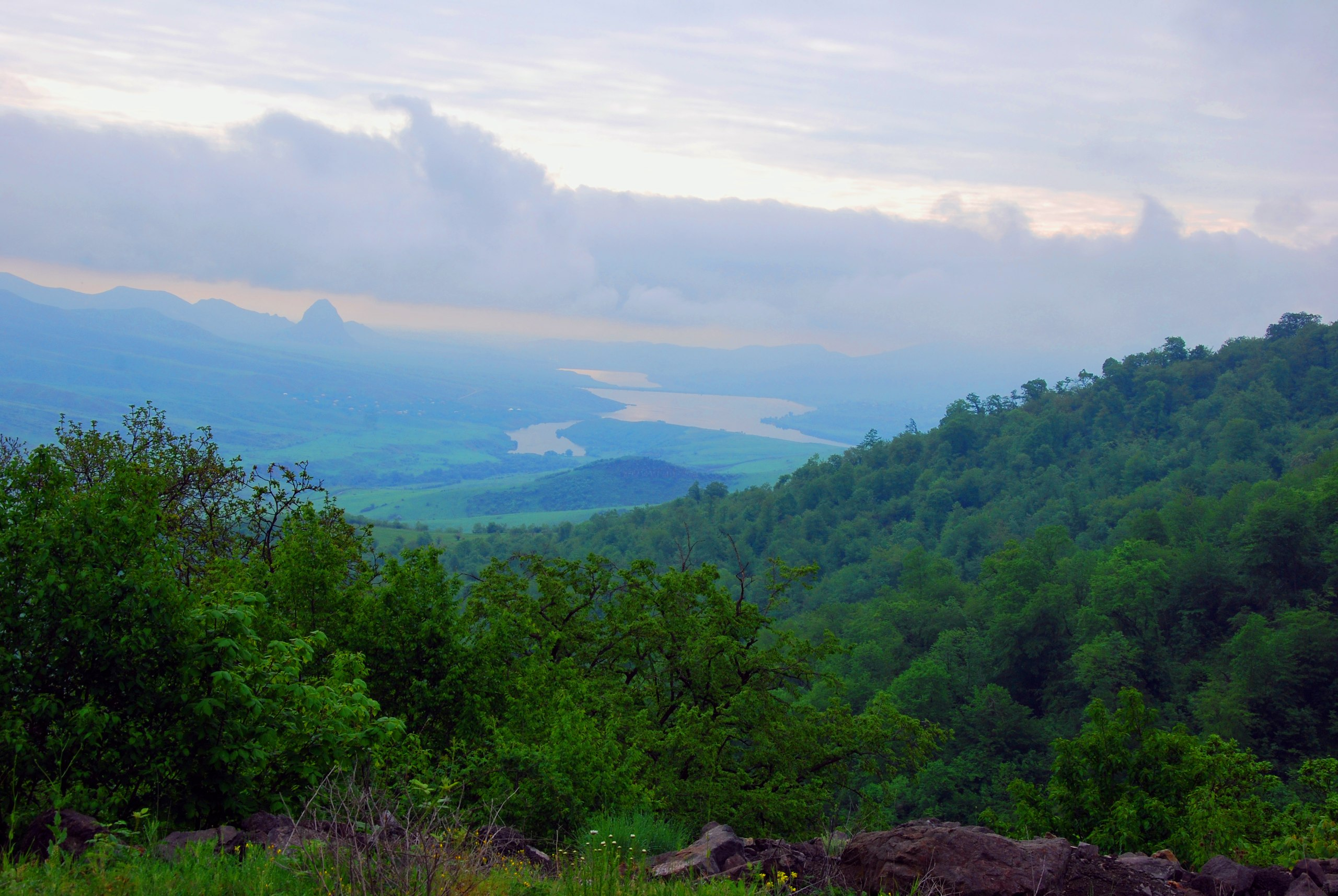
Noyemberyan countryside

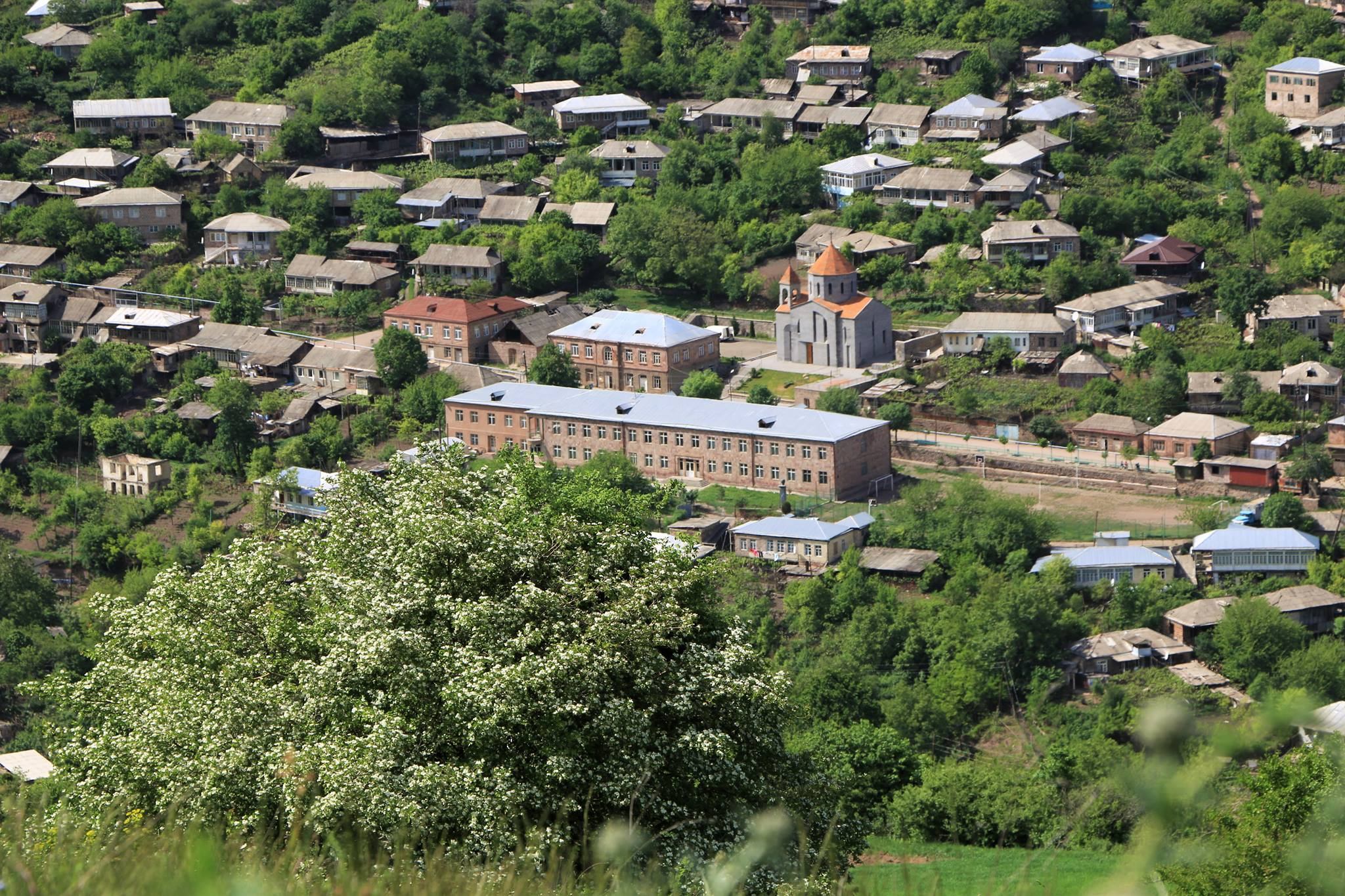
Movses village

== See also ==
- Eridzor
- Geyarchin
- Golovino
- Kirgi
- Kozman
- Krivoy Most
- Maflar
- Papanino
- Turdzhan
- UWC Dilijan
- Ijevan Wine-Brandy Factory
- Dilijan National Park
- Ijevan Dendropark
