= Khachatur of Taron =

Armenian poet and musician (died 1184)

Khachatur Tarontsi Խաչատուր Տարոնացի
- Born: 12th century Taron, Greater Armenia
- Died: 1184; Haghartsin Monastery, Tavush, Armenia
- Occupation(s): Poet, composer, cleric

Khachatur of Taron or Khatchatur Taronatsi (Armenian: Խաչատուր Տարոնացի; 12th century, in Taron, Turuberan, Greater Armenia – 1184, at Haghartsin Monastery) was an Armenian poet, musician and religious figure, who wrote a number of medieval sharakans.

It is known that he was born in Taron and eventually settled in Eastern Armenia during the Zakarid period. During this time, the first few decades of the thirteenth century, the region was enjoying relative prosperity and development. In the 1230s, he was put in charge of the monastery of Haghartsin, in the province of Dzorapor. From Western Armenia he brought with him to Dzorapor many spiritual chants transcribed in the khaz notation. As elsewhere, this system of musical notation was gradually replaced by the system still in use today.
