= Haghartsin, Armenia =

Village in Tavush, Armenia

Haghartsin Հաղարծին
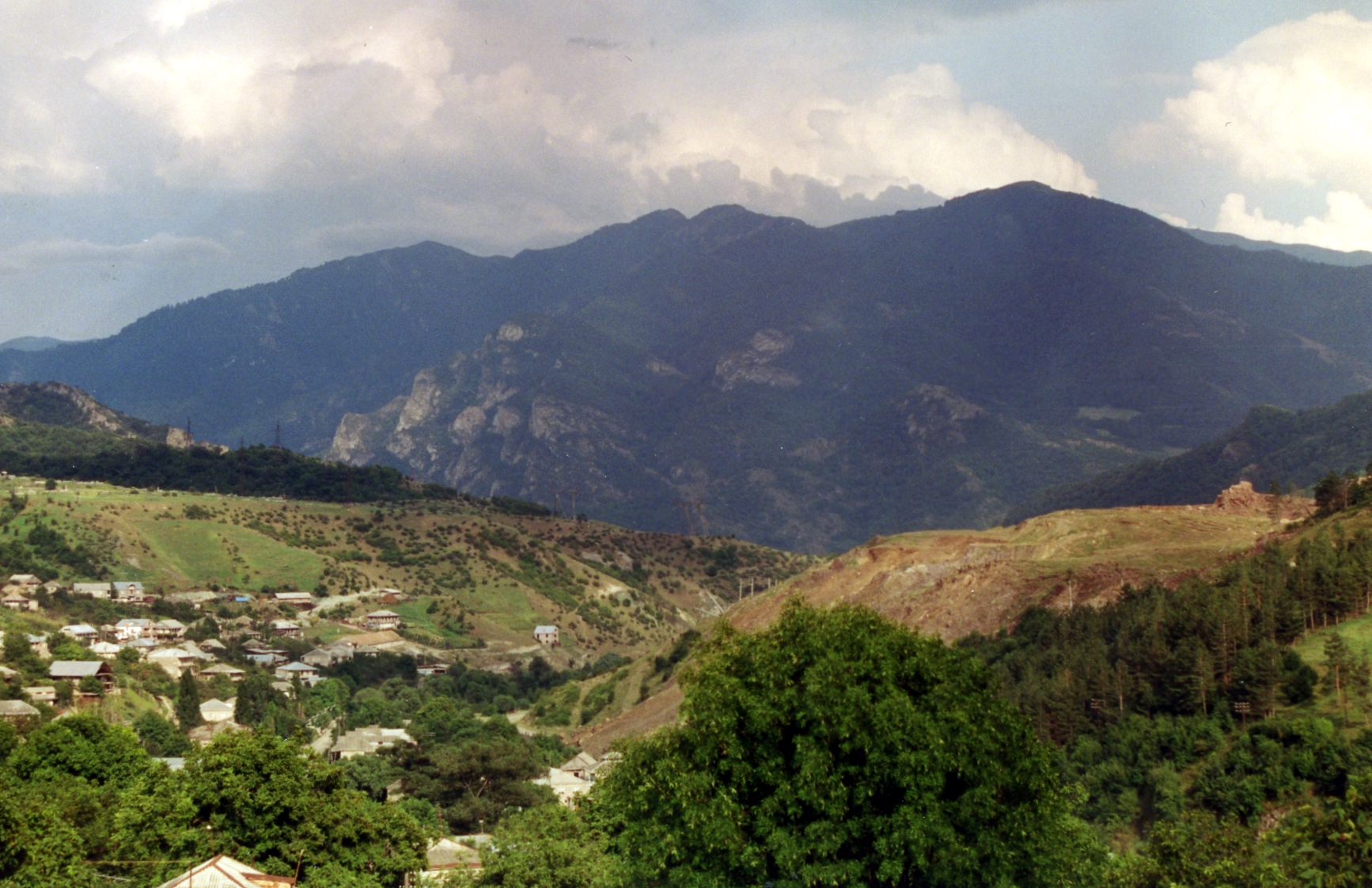
- A view of Haghartsin

- Location within Armenia Location within Tavush
- Coordinates: 40°46′41″N 44°57′45″E
- Country: Armenia
- Province: Tavush
- Municipality: Dilijan

Government
  - Mayor: Sargis Poghosyan

Population (2011)
  - Total: 3,791
- Time zone: UTC+4 (AMT)

Haghartsin (Armenian: Հաղարծին) is a village in the Dilijan Municipality of the Tavush Province of Armenia. The 13th-century Haghartsin Monastery is located around 8 km northwest of the village.

== Toponymy ==
It was founded in 1815 as Jarkhech by Prince Jar Artsruni. In 1940, the village was renamed Kuybyshev after the Soviet politician Valerian Kuybyshev. In 1992, the village was renamed Haghartsin, after the nearby Haghartsin Monastery.

== Gallery ==
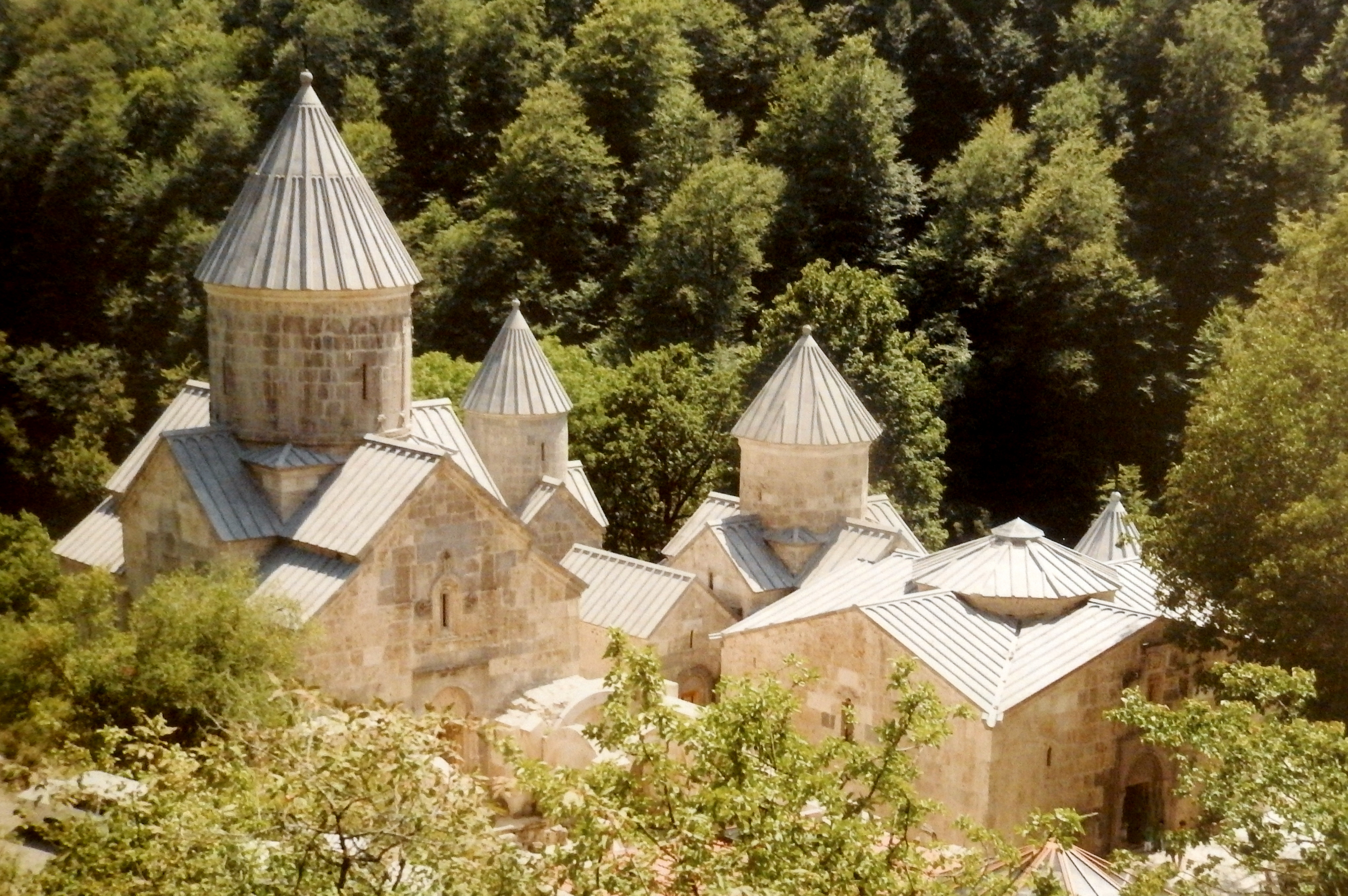
Nearby 13th-century Haghartsin Monastery

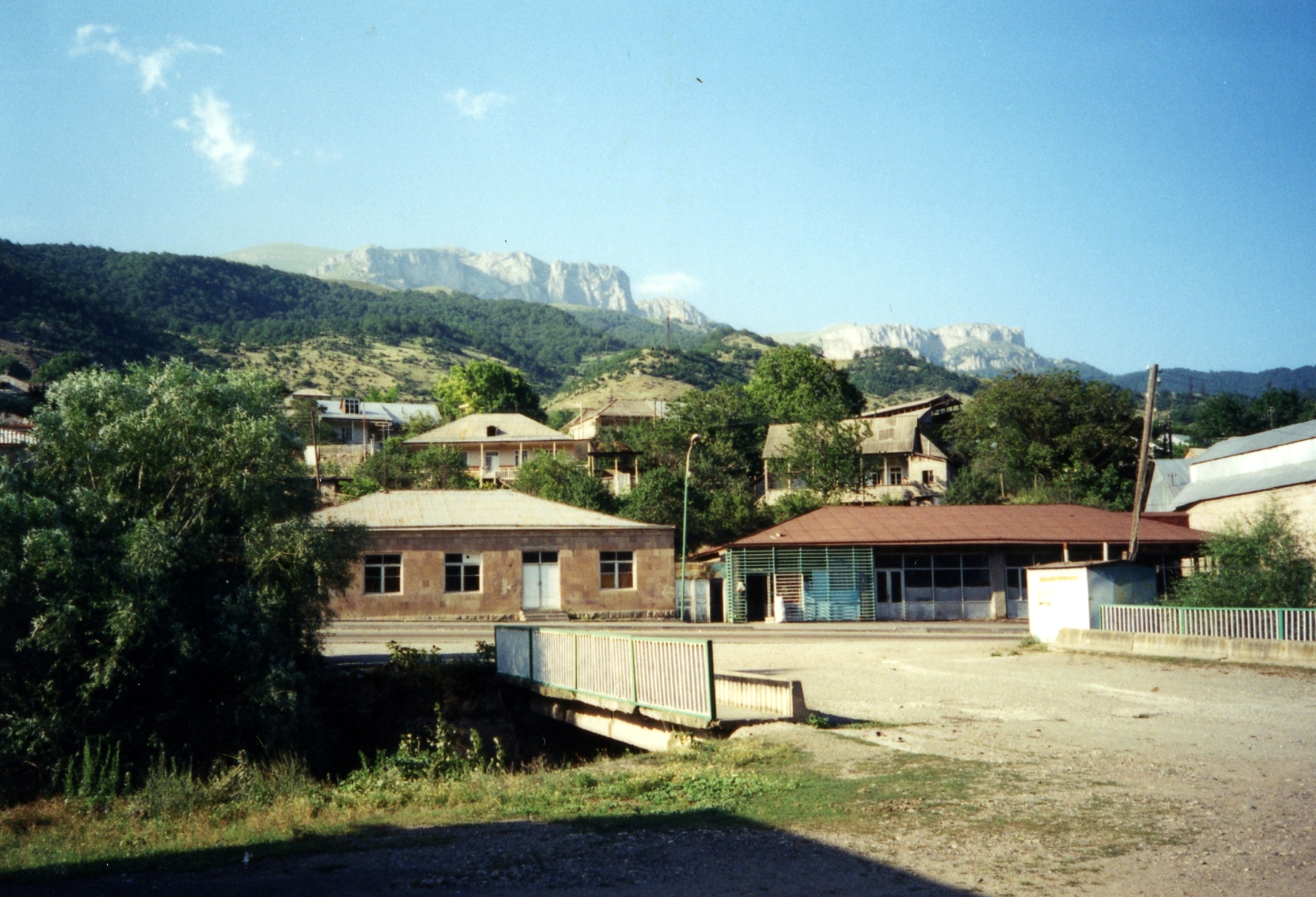
Haghartsin

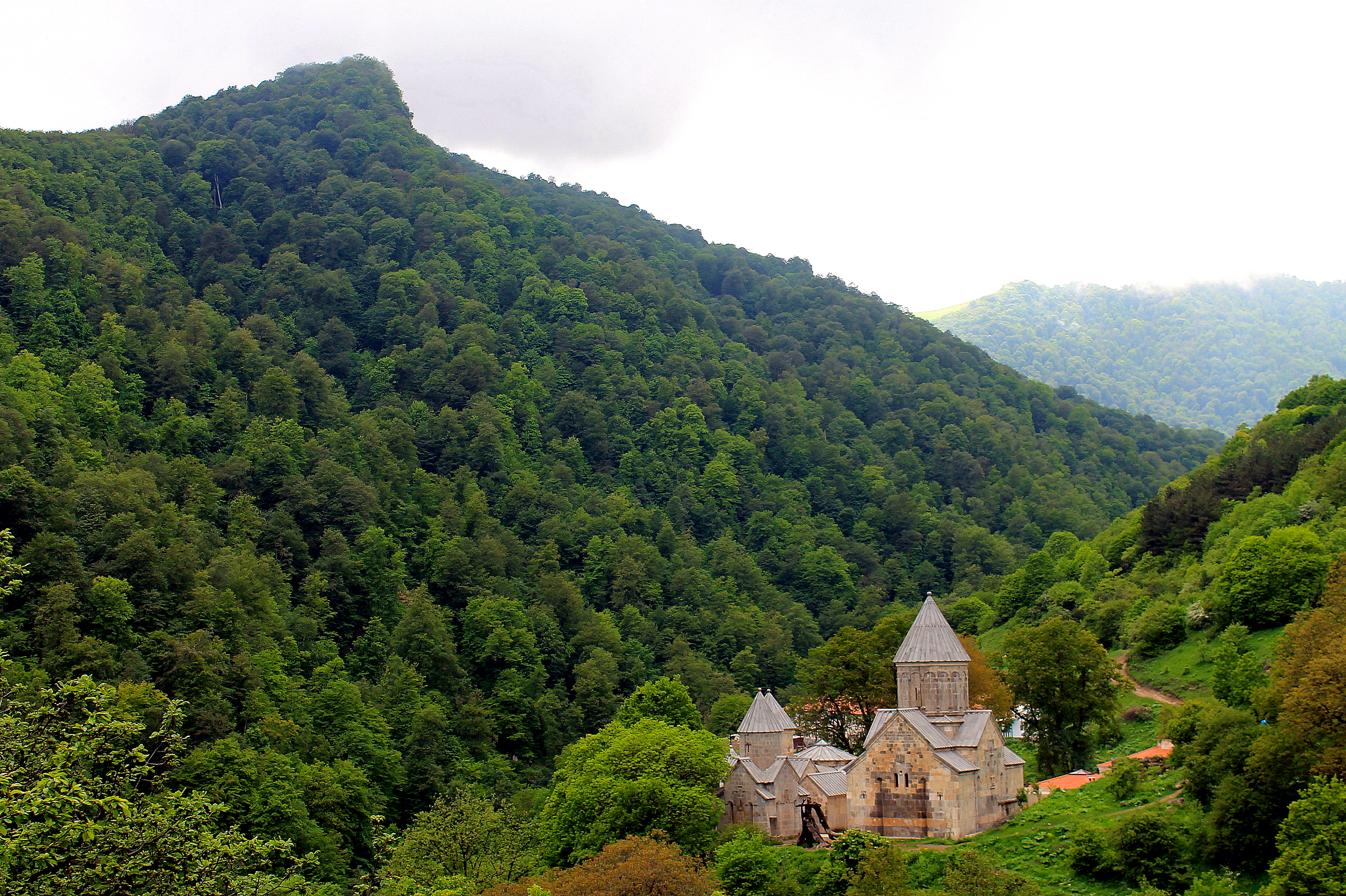
Haghartsin Monastery

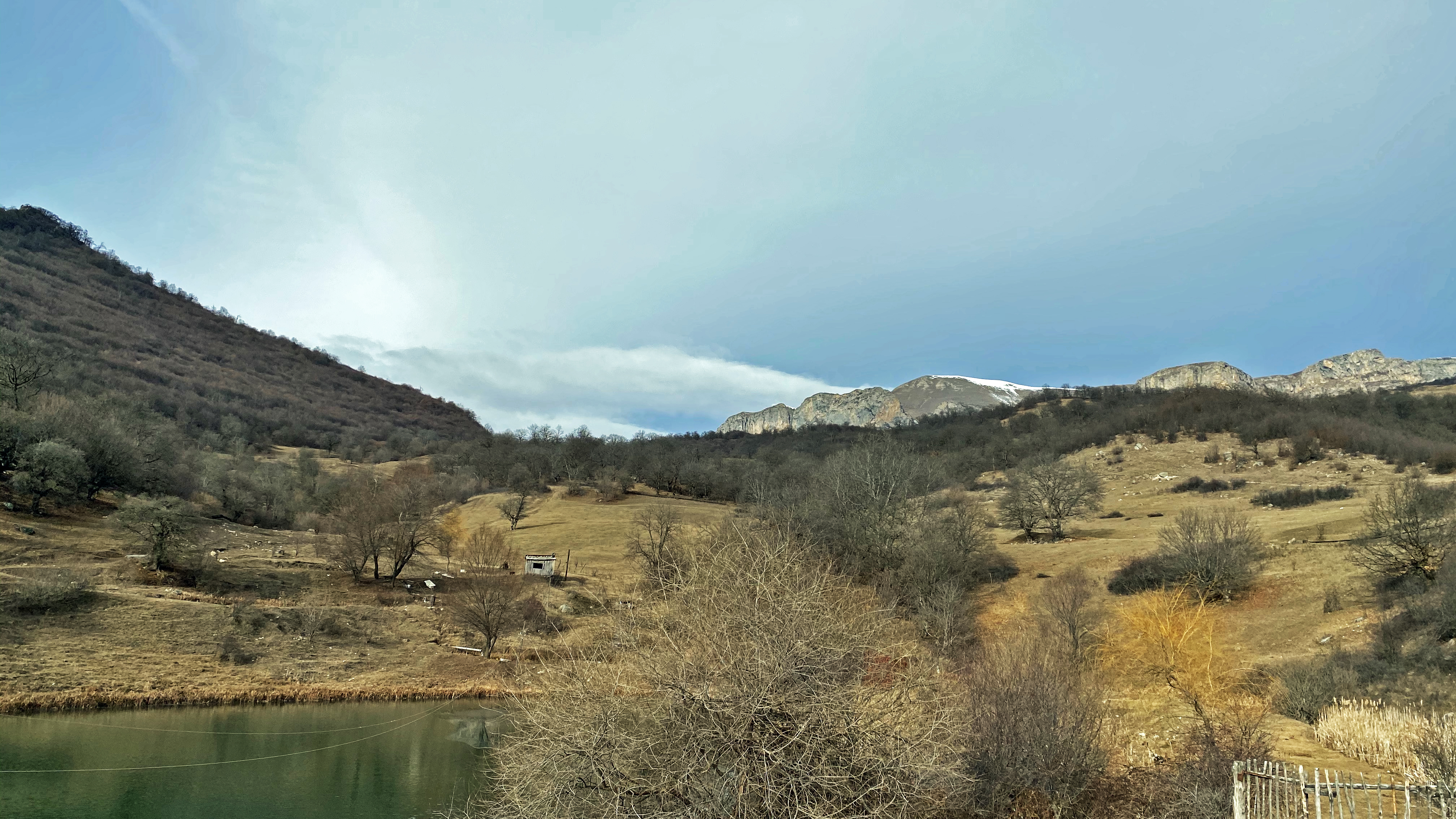
Nature around Haghartsin

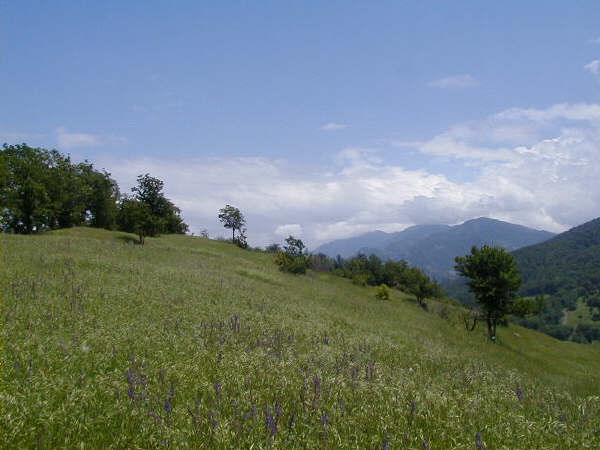
Nature around Haghartsin

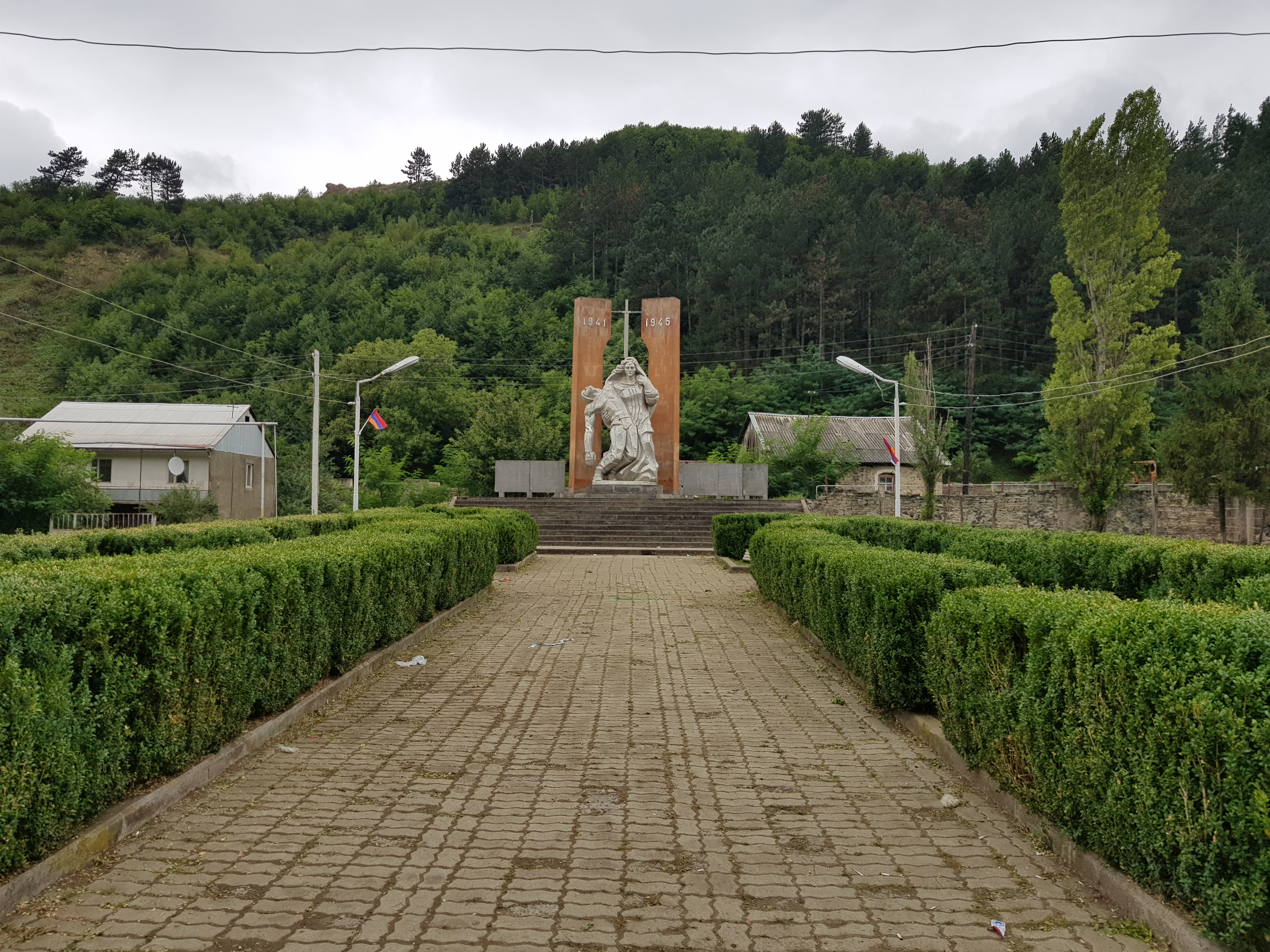
WWII monument

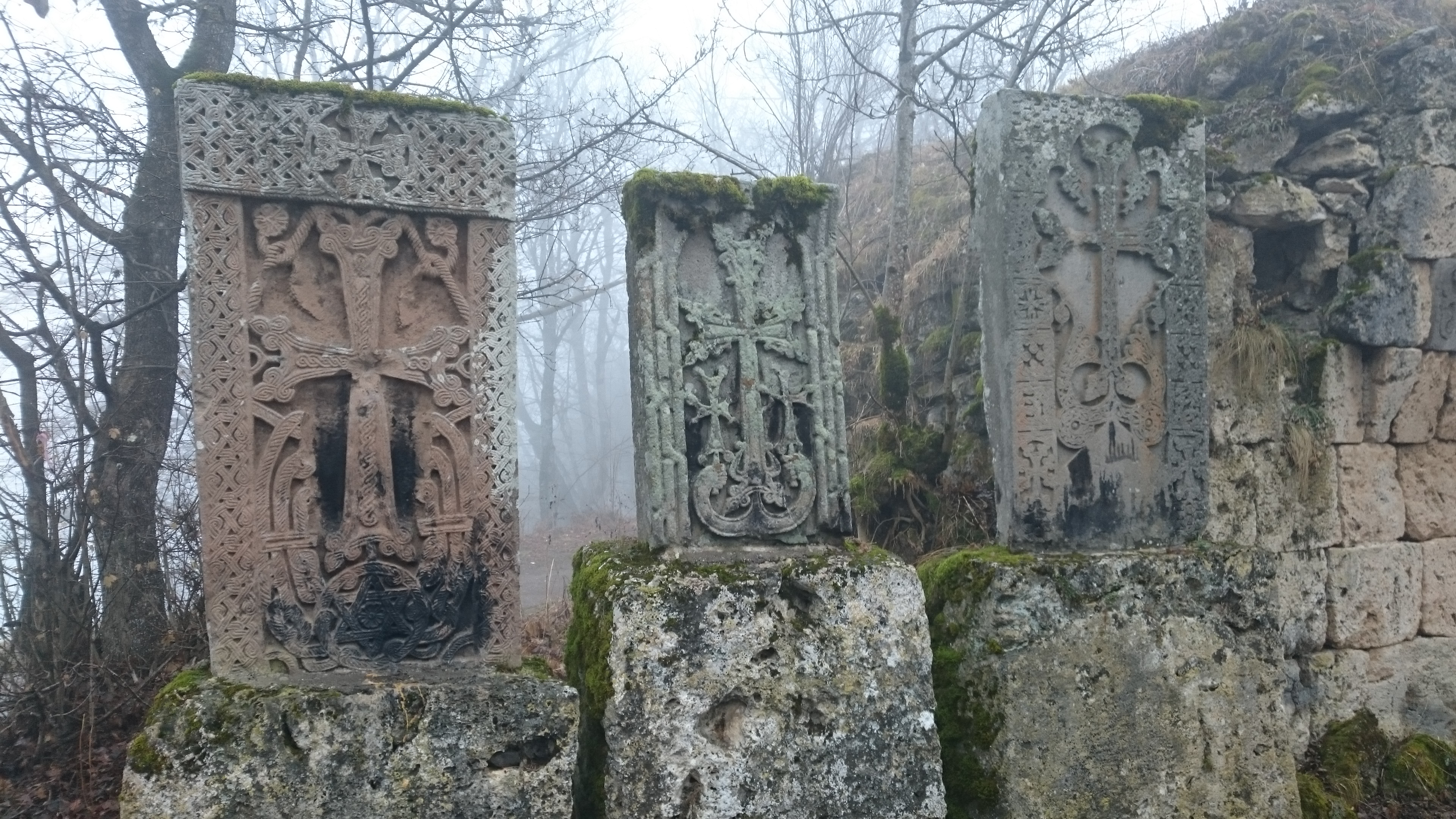
Khachkars
