= Dzorapor =

Historic region of Armenia

Dzorapor was a historic gavar (canton) of Armenia, it is located in the province of Gugark.
