= Haghartsin Monastery =

Monastery in Armenia

- Հաղարծնի վանք
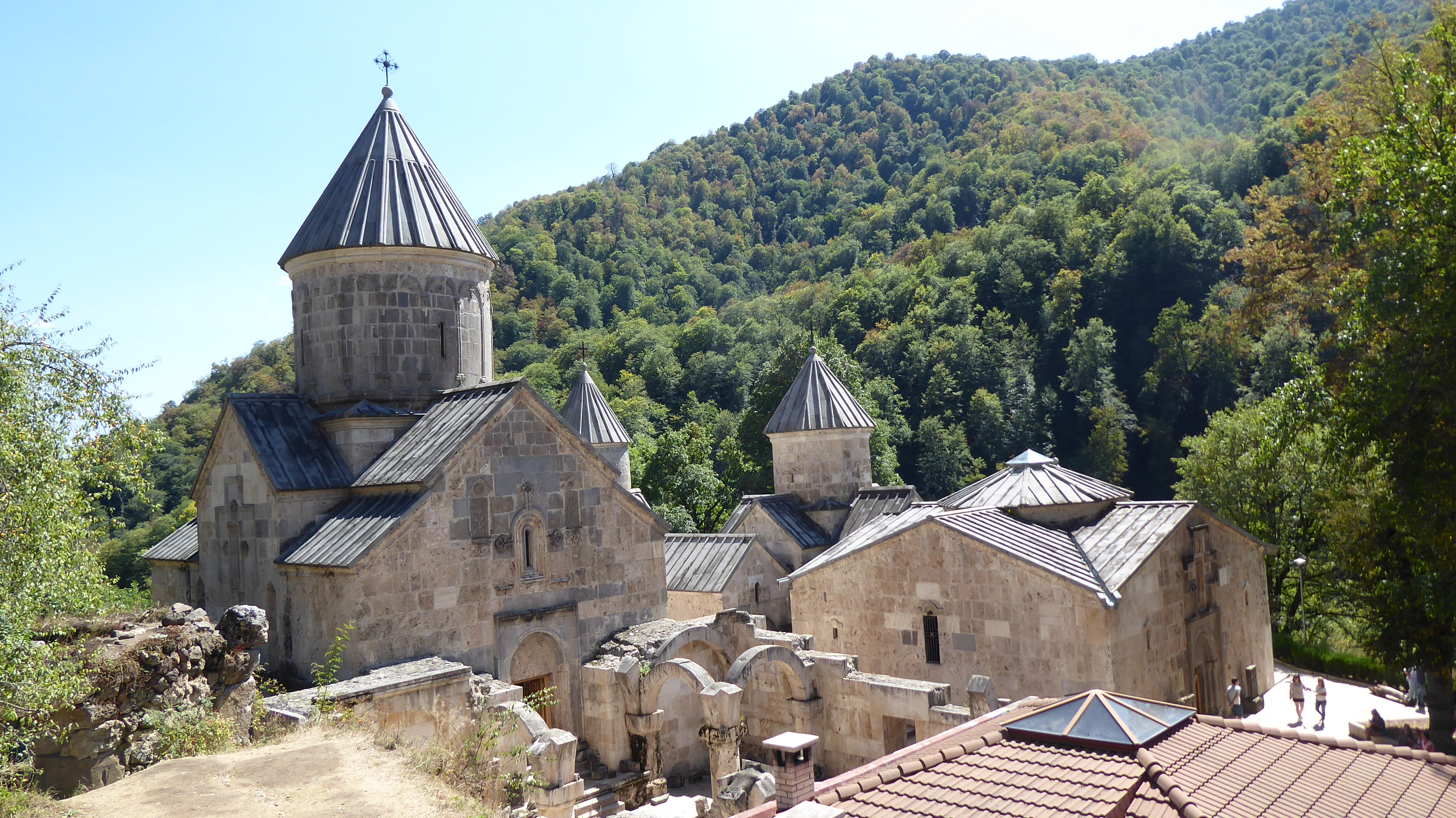

- Location within Armenia Location within Tavush

Religion
- Affiliation: Armenian Apostolic Church

Location
- Location: Near Dilijan, Tavush Province, Armenia
- Coordinates: 40.768489°N 44.890875°E

Architecture
- Style: Armenian
- Completed: 10th–13th century

Haghartsin (Armenian: Հաղարծին, romanized: Hałarcin) is a medieval Armenian monastery located near the town of Dilijan in the Tavush Province of Armenia. It was built between the 10th and 13th centuries. It is composed of three churches: St. Gregory's (the oldest one), St. Stephen's, and St. Astvatsatsin (St. Mary's, the largest one), as well as a gavit and a refectory.

== Etymology ==
Popular etymology derives the name of Haghartsin from the words khaghats’ 'moved around, played' and artsiv 'eagle'. Haghartsin is also the name of a stream which flows past the monastery and empties into the Aghstev.

== History ==
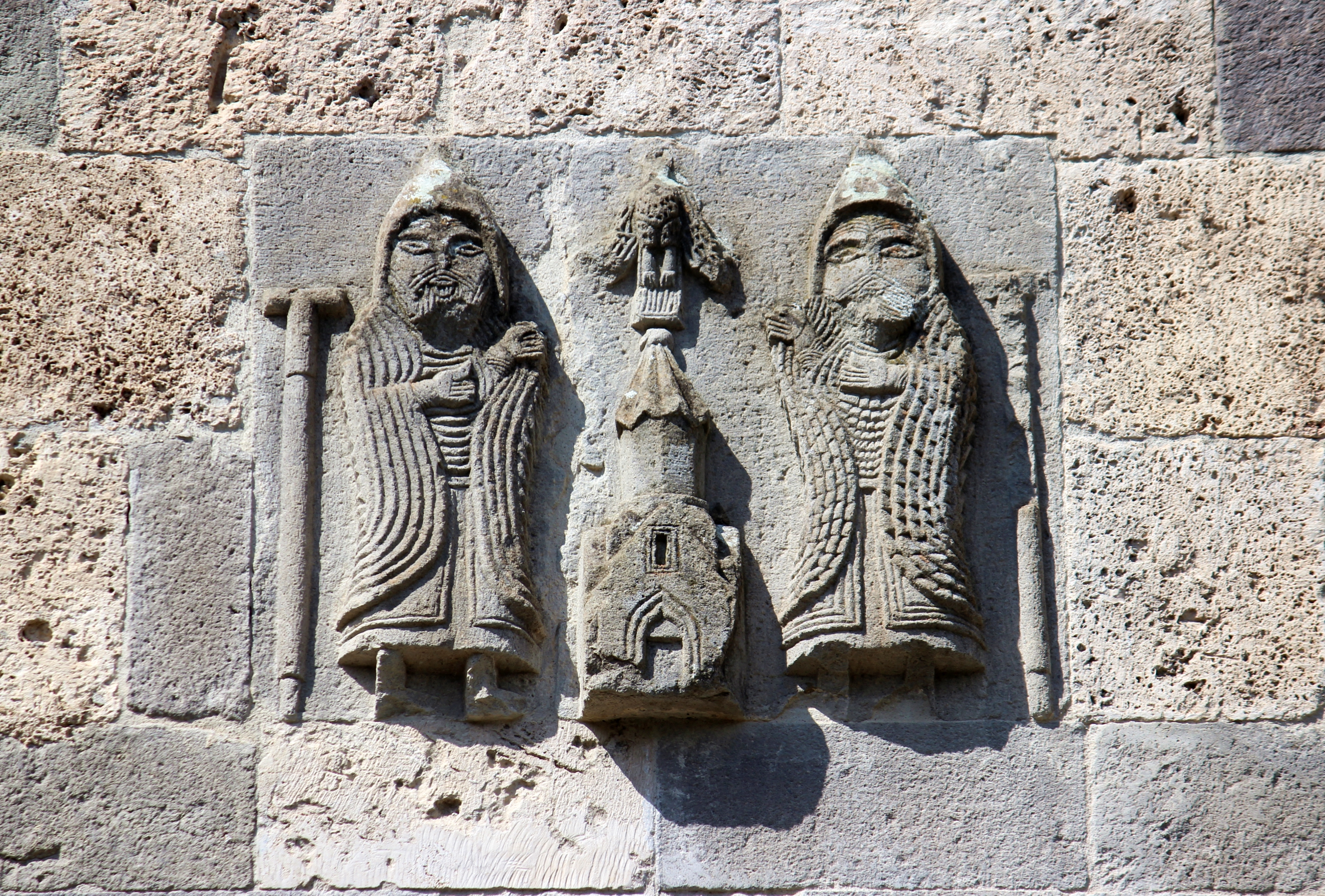
Low-relief depiction commemorating the patronage of the Zakaryan brothers (Zakare and Ivane), on the upper east exterior wall of St. Astvatatsin Church.

Haghartsin is thought to have been founded in the 10th century, although the exact founding date is unknown. It is assumed that kings of the Kiurikian dynasty, a branch of the Bagratuni dynasty, are buried in the partially destroyed sepulchre next to St. Gregory's Church, which contains two graves (formerly three) with partially legible inscriptions. According to another view, the Bagratuni kings Smbat II (r. 977–990) and Gagik I (r. 990–1020) are the ones buried there, although the historian Stepanos Asoghik reports that Smbat was buried in Ani. The monastery was almost entirely destroyed by the Seljuks in the 11th century, but was then renovated by the Zakarid princes Zakare and Ivane from 1184. At that time, the Monastery Church of St. Gregory (Surb Grigor) was built, and simultaneously a žamatun was added on the western side. Ivane left a dedicatory inscription following the death of his brother in 1213:

God loved my head's crown of glory — Zak‘aria — and called to Himself the one who was courageous. And I built our patrimonial Monastery of Hałarcin, a žamatun with arches and resembling a rock, adjacent to (the Church of) St. Gregory. And I donated an orchard in Erewan in memory of my brother and its servants are required to officiate a mass perpetually at the main altar for Zak‘arē...

— Dedication by Ivane.

The two brothers chose Haghartsin as their family's burial ground. The 13th-century Armenian historian Kirakos Gandzaketsi mentions that Khachatur of Taron, the renowned musician who served as the abbot of Haghartsin, attended the consecration of one of the churches of Nor Getik, which occurred in 1194. Kirakos also credits Khachatur with the reconstruction and expansion of the monastery.

== St. Astvatsatsin Church ==
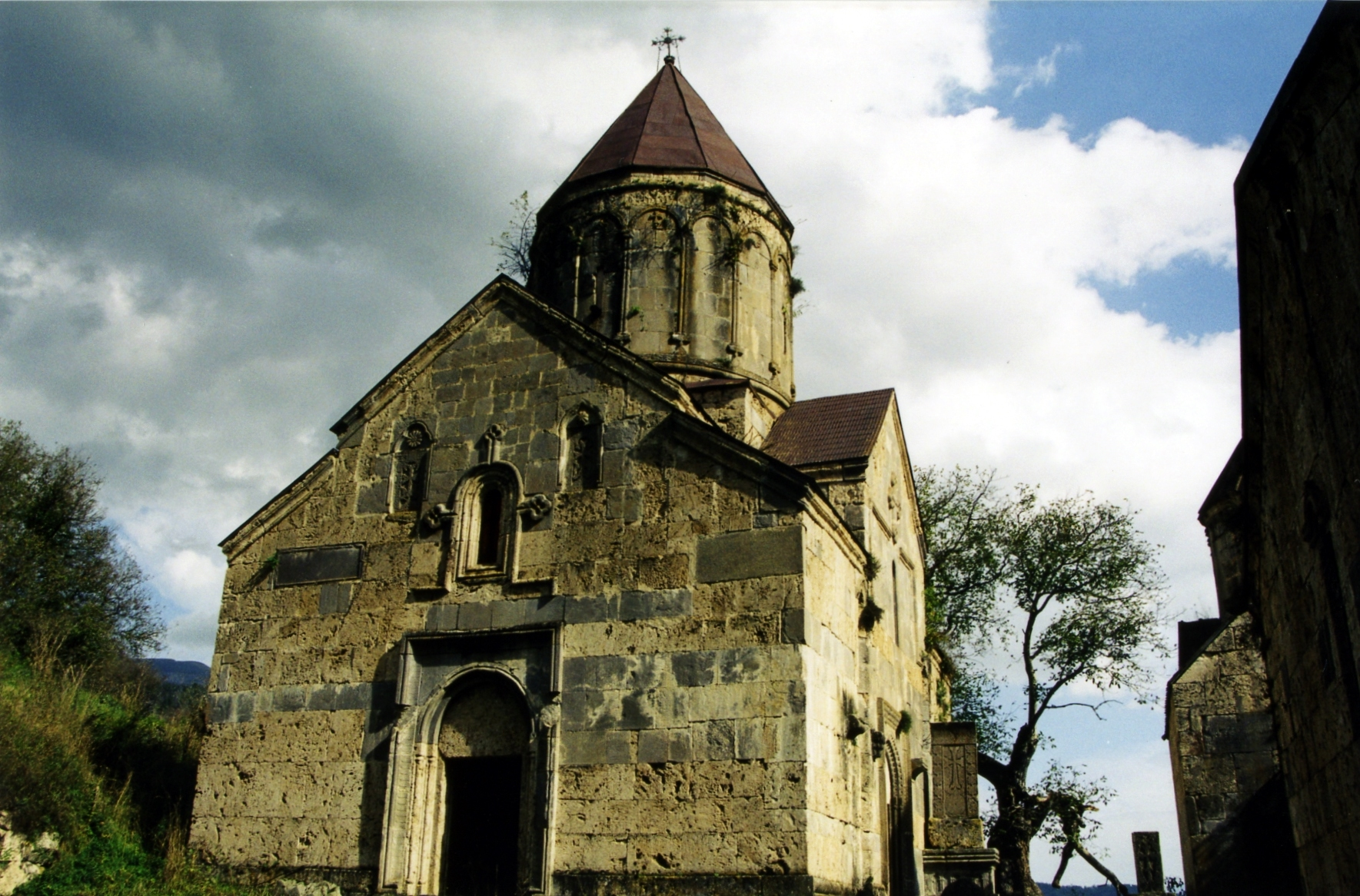
St. Astvatsatsin Church before reconstruction.

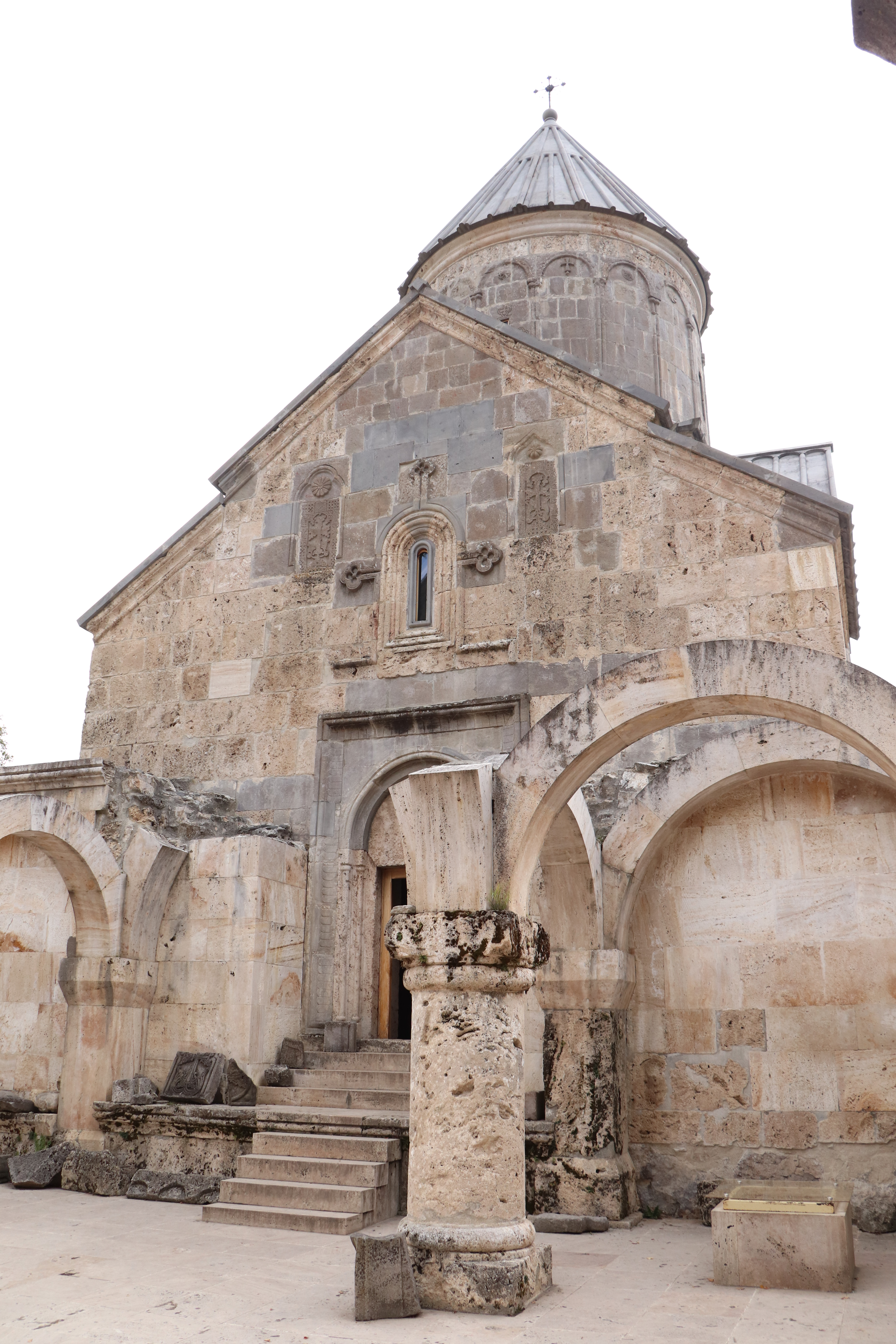
St. Astvatsatsin Church after reconstruction.

St. Astvatsatsin Church in Haghartsin (1281) is the largest building and the dominant artistic feature. The sixteen-faced dome is decorated with arches, the bases of whose columns are connected by triangular ledges and spheres, with a band around the drum's bottom. This adds to the optical height of the dome and creates the impression that its drum is weightless. The platband of the southern portal's architrave is framed with rows of trefoils.

The sculptural group of the church's eastern facade differs in composition from the similar bas-reliefs of Sanahin, Haghpat, and Harich. It shows two men in monks' attire who point with their hands at a church model and a picture of a dove with half-spread wings placed between them. The umbrella roofing of the model's dome shows the original look of the dome of Astvatsatsin church. The figures are shown wearing different dresses — the one standing right is dressed more richly than the one standing left. The faces, with their long whiskers, luxuriant combed beards, and large almond-shaped eyes, are also executed in different manners. These are probably the founders of the church, the Father Superior and his assistant.

Outside the south door is a khachkar carved by an artist named Poghos in the 13th century.

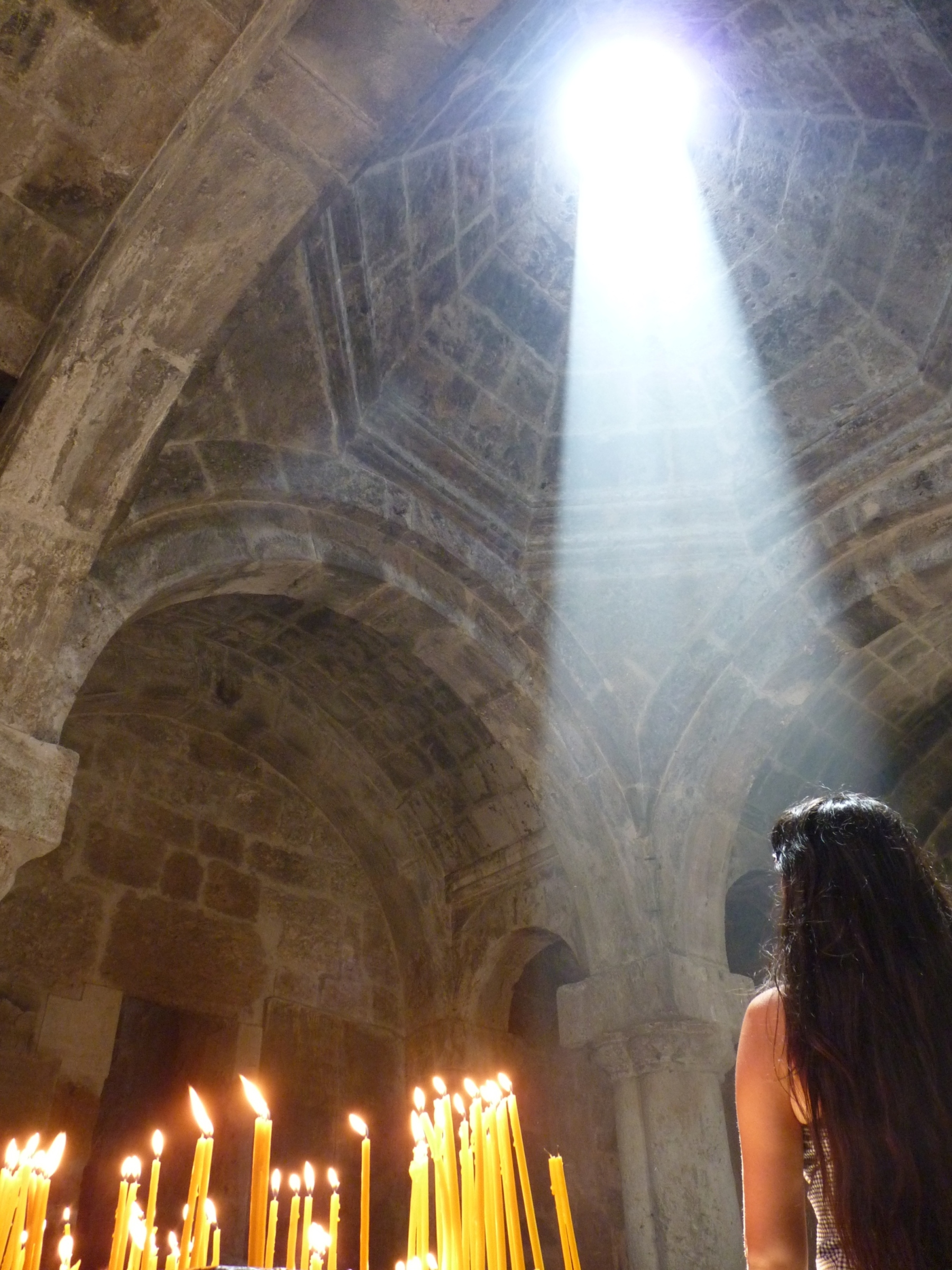
Summer sunlight illumination in the zhamatun

== St. Astvatsatsin Church gavit ==
The gavit of St. Astvatsatsin Church is severely damaged. The ruins show clearly where it stood; however, the walls are almost completely destroyed.

== St. Gregory's Church ==
The oldest large structure of the complex, probably dating from the 10th century, St. Gregory's (Surb Grigor) Church, is accessible through its gavit, which is wider than the church itself. The dome has an octagonal tambour. An important school of church music was located in this church.

== St. Gregory's Church gavit ==
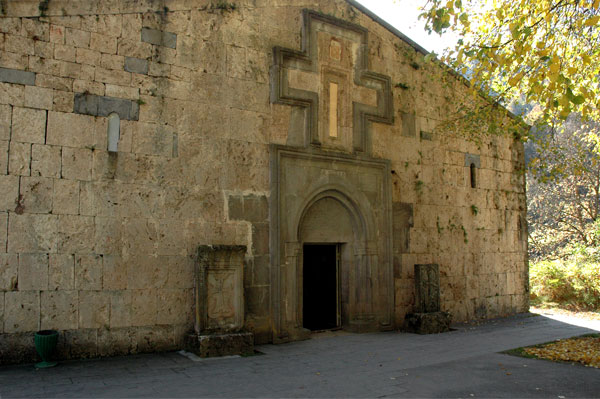
St. Gregory's Church gavit.

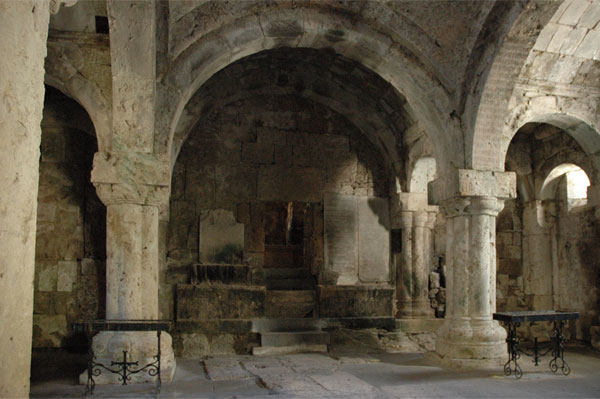
Interior of St. Gregory's Church gavit.

The 12th-century gavit abutting St. Gregory's Church is the most common type of plan. It is a square building, with roofing supported by four internal abutments, and with squat octahedral tents above the central sections, somewhat similar to the Armenian peasant home of the glkhatun type. The gavit has ornamented corner sections. Decorated with rosettes, these sections contain sculptures of human figures in monks' attires, carrying crosses, staffs, and birds. The framing of the central window of Haghartsin's gavit is cross-shaped. Placed right above the portal of the main entrance, it emphasizes the central part of the façade.

One of the half-columns along the right-hand wall towards the back has come forward, showing that it is hollow. According to legend, this was swung open and shut in the past and monastery riches were hidden inside at times of war and invasion.

== St. Stephen's Church ==
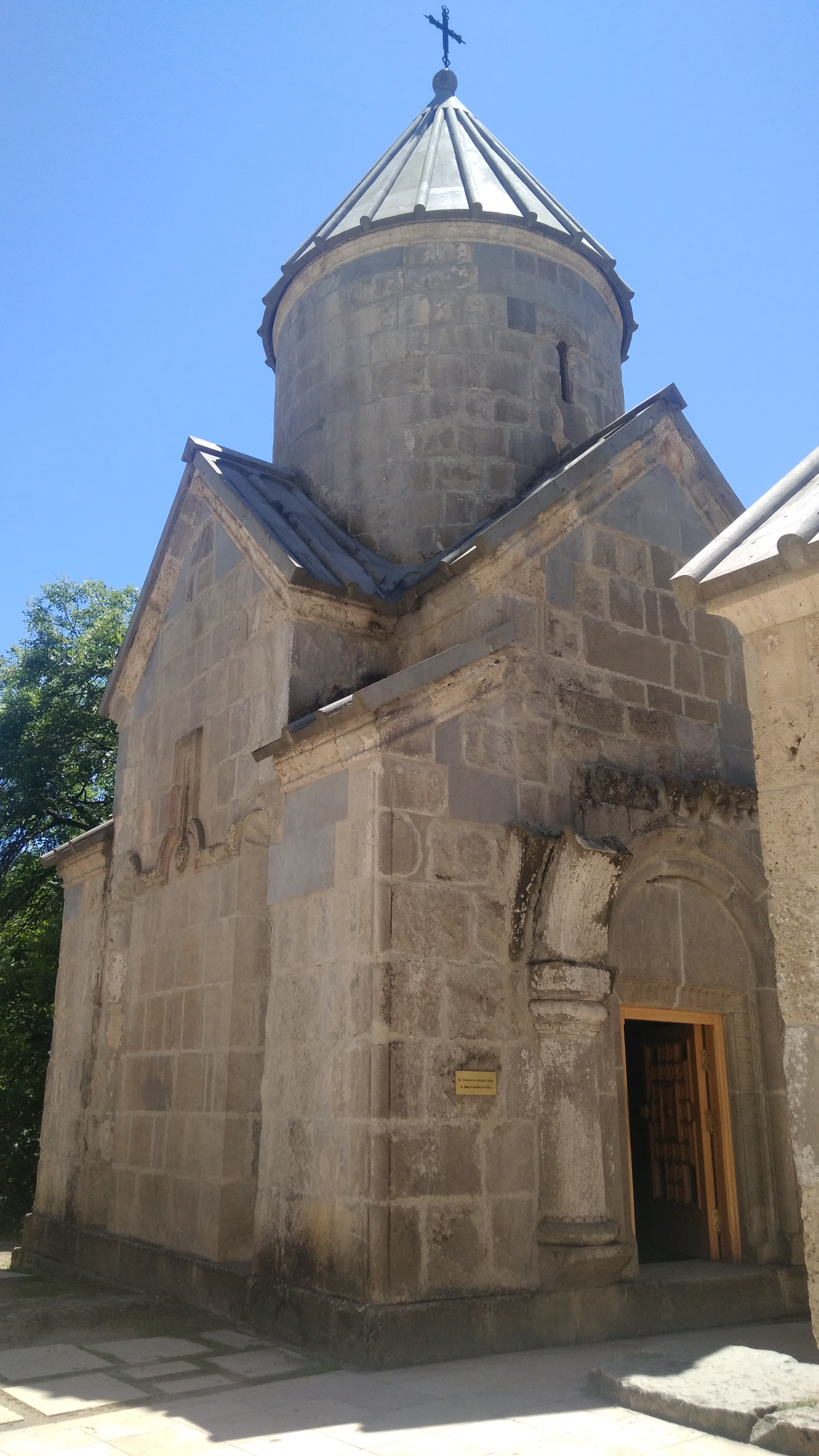
St. Stephen's Church

The small St. Stephen's (Surb Stepanos) Church dates to 1244.

== Sepulchre ==
A royal sepulchre is located next to the southern wall of the gavit of St. Gregory's Church. Sometime between 1865 and 1895, the abbot at the time tore down the walls of the sepulchre and used the stones for other structures, although the foundation walls remain. There were once three gravestones there, of which only two have survived, with partially legible inscriptions. One gravestone reads "This is the grave of the kings G… [Ays ē hangstaran tagaworac῾ G]" and the other reads "King Smbat"; in the 19th century, Sargis Jalaliants recorded the first inscription as "Ays ē hangstaran tagaworac῾ Gagay ew Gawgay". It is assumed that kings of the Kiurikian dynasty, a branch of the Bagratuni dynasty, are buried in the sepulchre. According to another view, the Bagratuni kings Smbat II (r. 977–990) and Gagik I (r. 990–1020) are the ones buried there, although the historian Stepanos Asoghik reports that Smbat was buried in Ani.

== Refectory ==
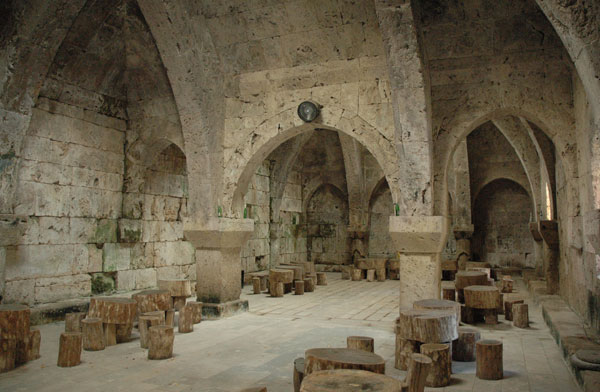
Refectory interior

Like the refectory of Haghpat Monastery, the refectory of Haghartsin, built by the architect Minas in 1248, is divided by pillars into two square-plan parts roofed with intersecting arches.

The walls are lined with stone benches, and at the western butt wall, next to the door, there is a broad archway for the numerous pilgrims to navigate. The decoration is concentrated only in the central sections of the roofing, near the main lighting apertures. The transition from the rectangle of their base to the octagon of the top is decorated with tre- and quatrefoils. The low abutments determine the size of the upstretched arches. The proportionally diminishing architectural shapes create the impression of airiness and space.

This space has large wooden log tables and chairs, where receptions occur after marriages or baptisms at the monastery.

== Current state ==
In 2011, Haghartsin Monastery underwent a major renovation by Armenia Fund with a donation from Sultan bin Muhammad Al-Qasimi, ruler of Sharjah. Today the complex is reachable by a paved road with a large parking area, a gift shop, a bakery, and other facilities on site. In 2017 the monastery was incorporated into the Transcaucasian Trail long-distance hiking route.

== Gallery ==
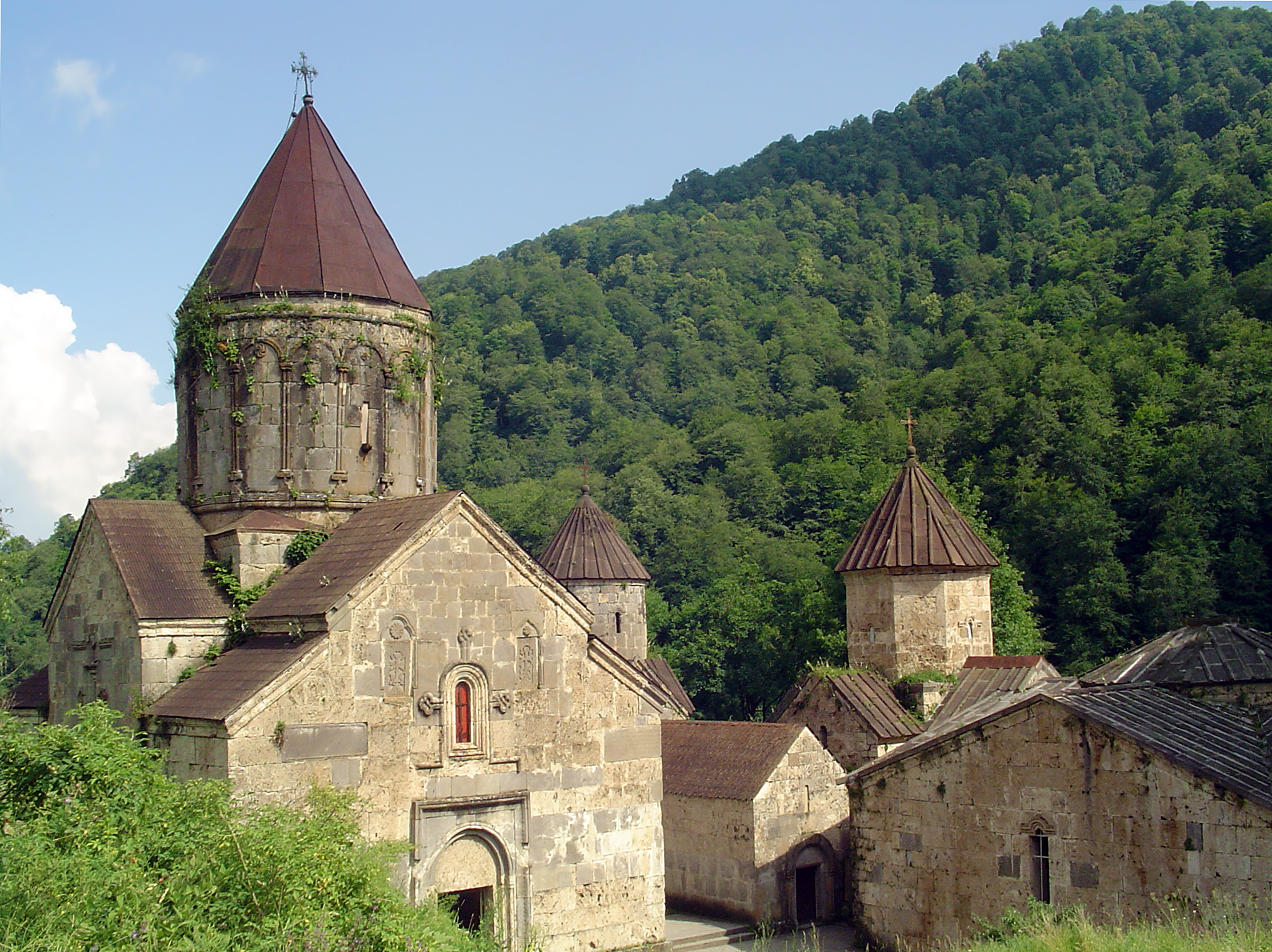
The Haghartsin monastic complex in July 2007, before the restoration

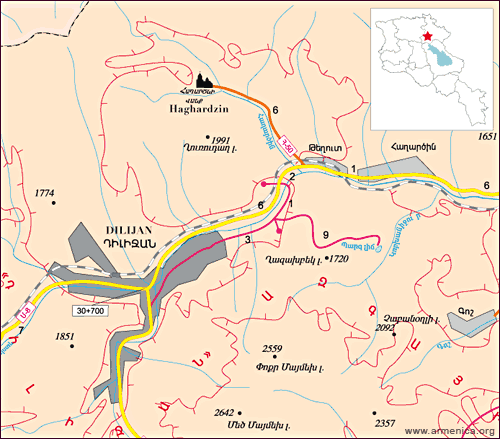
Location of Haghartsin near Dilijan

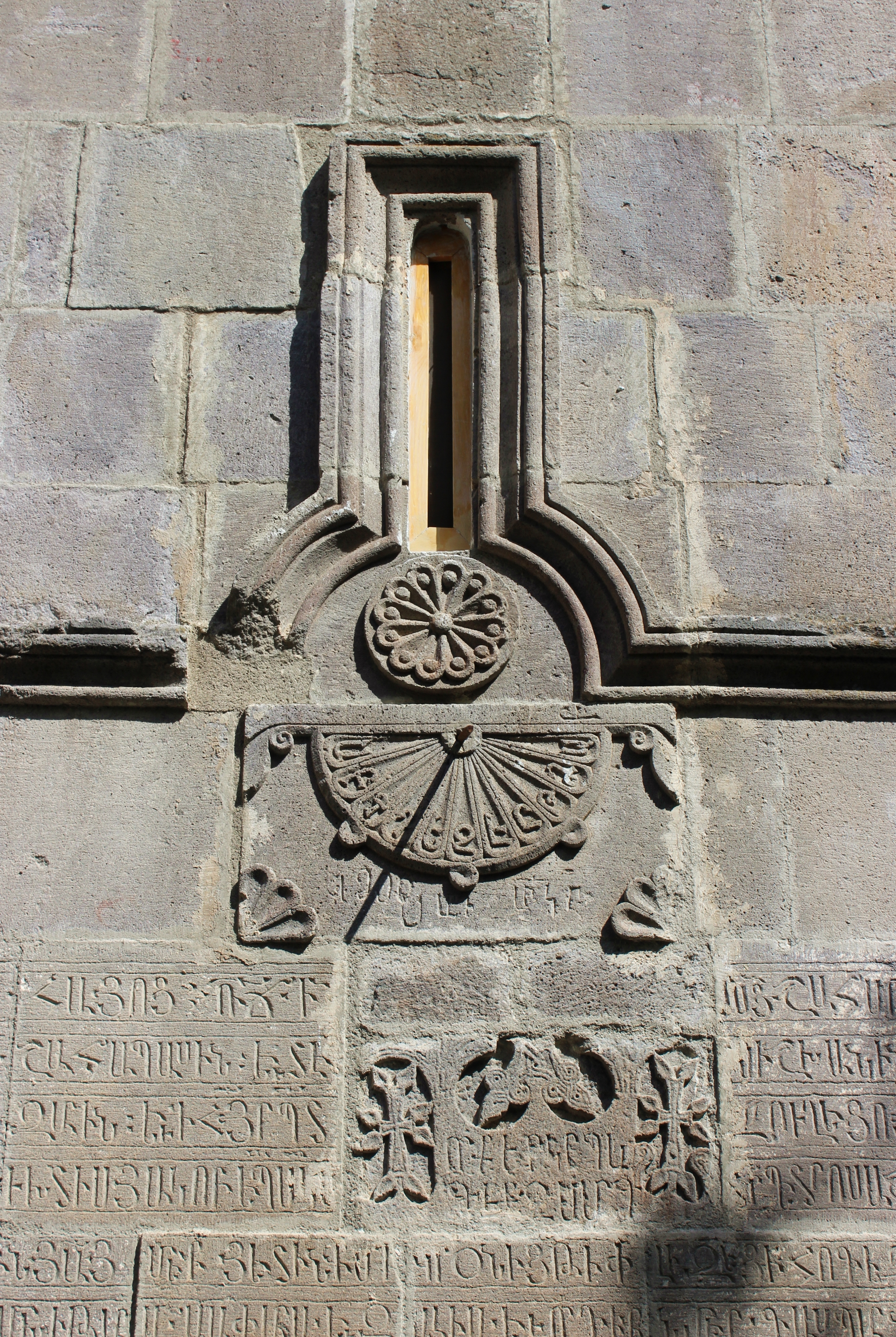
Exterior carvings and sundial on St. Stephen's Church

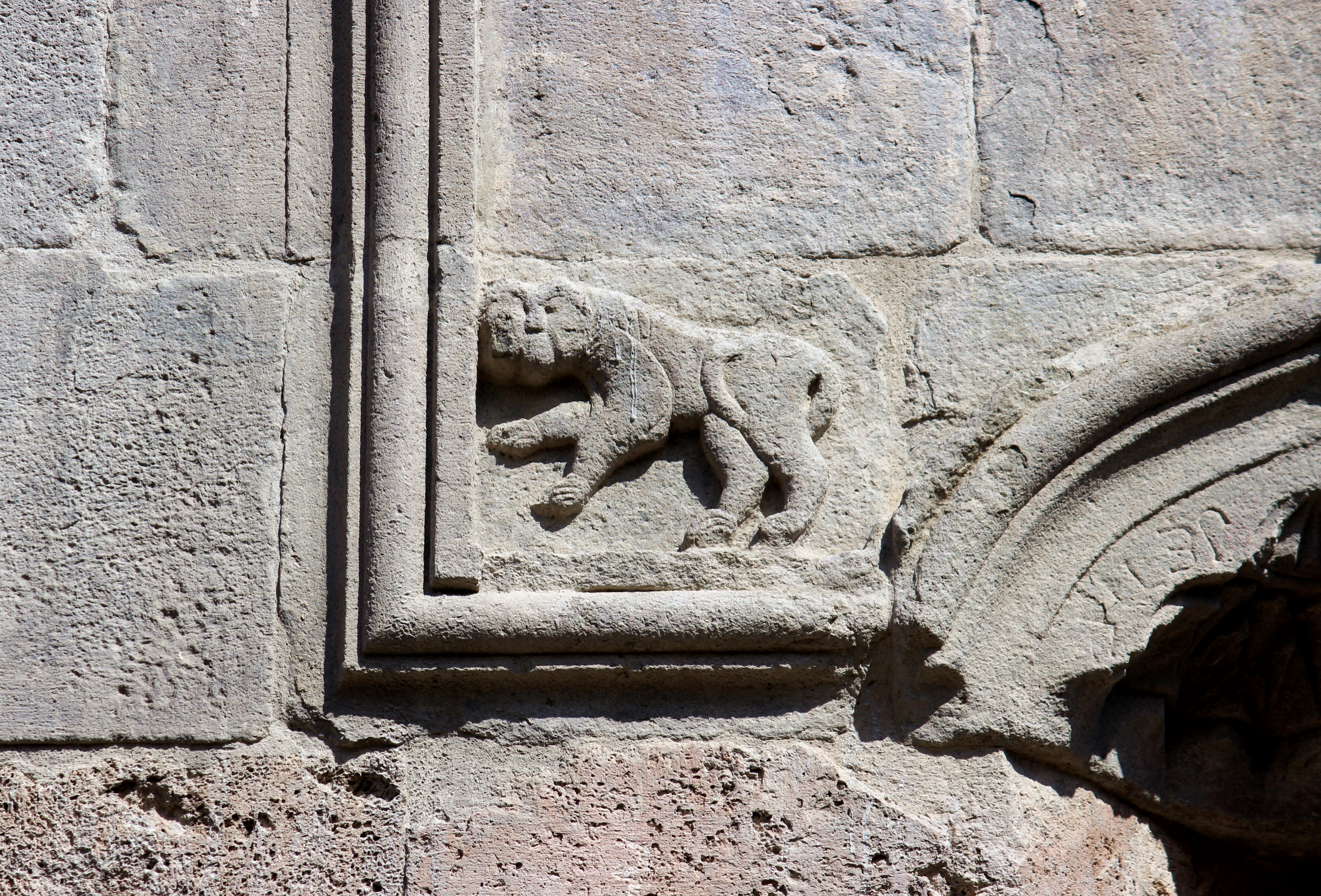
Low-relief depiction of a lion (symbol of the Bagratuni family) on the exterior wall of S. Stepanos Church

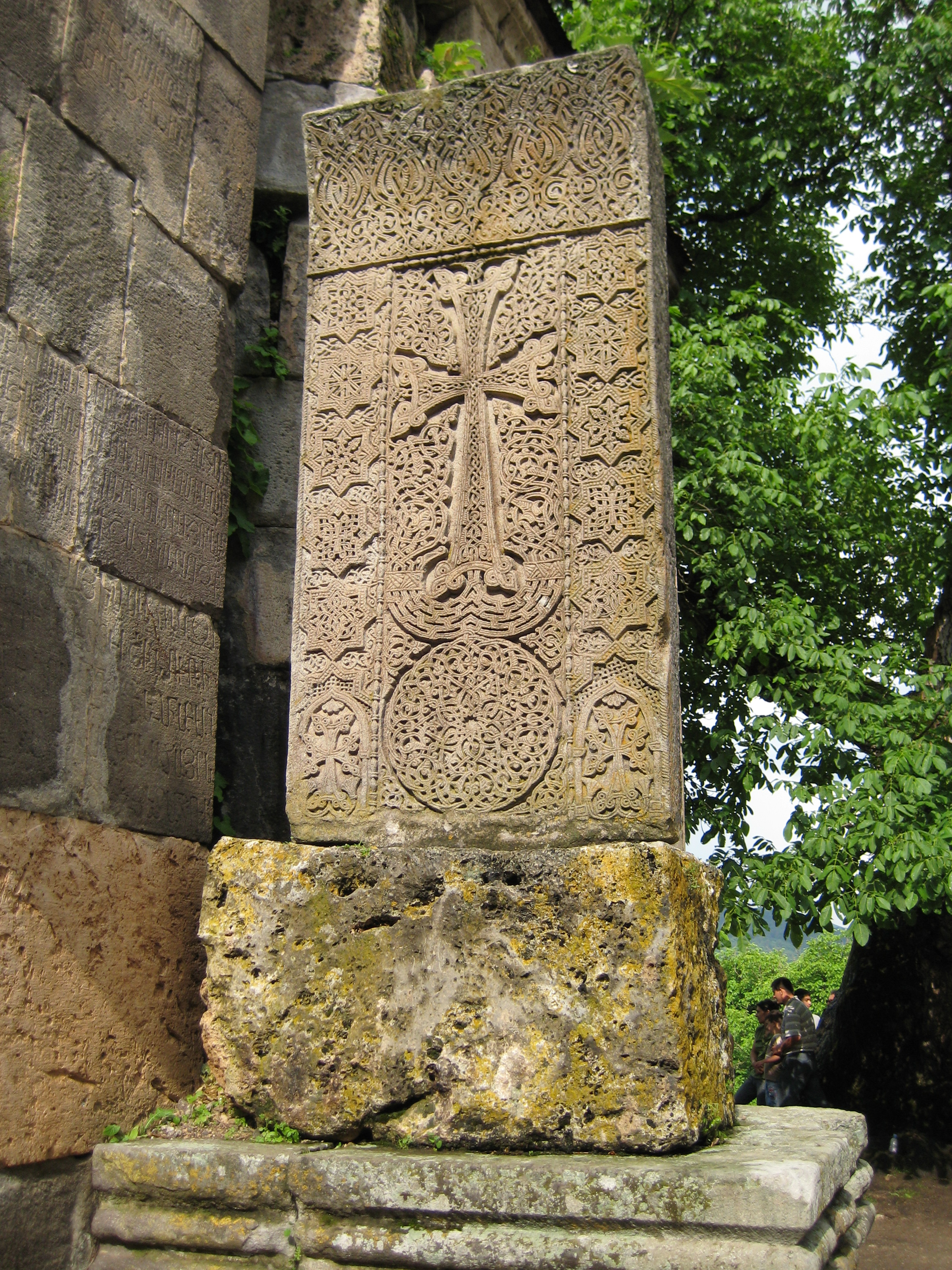
Khachkar by Poghos (13th century) next to the southern door of the church

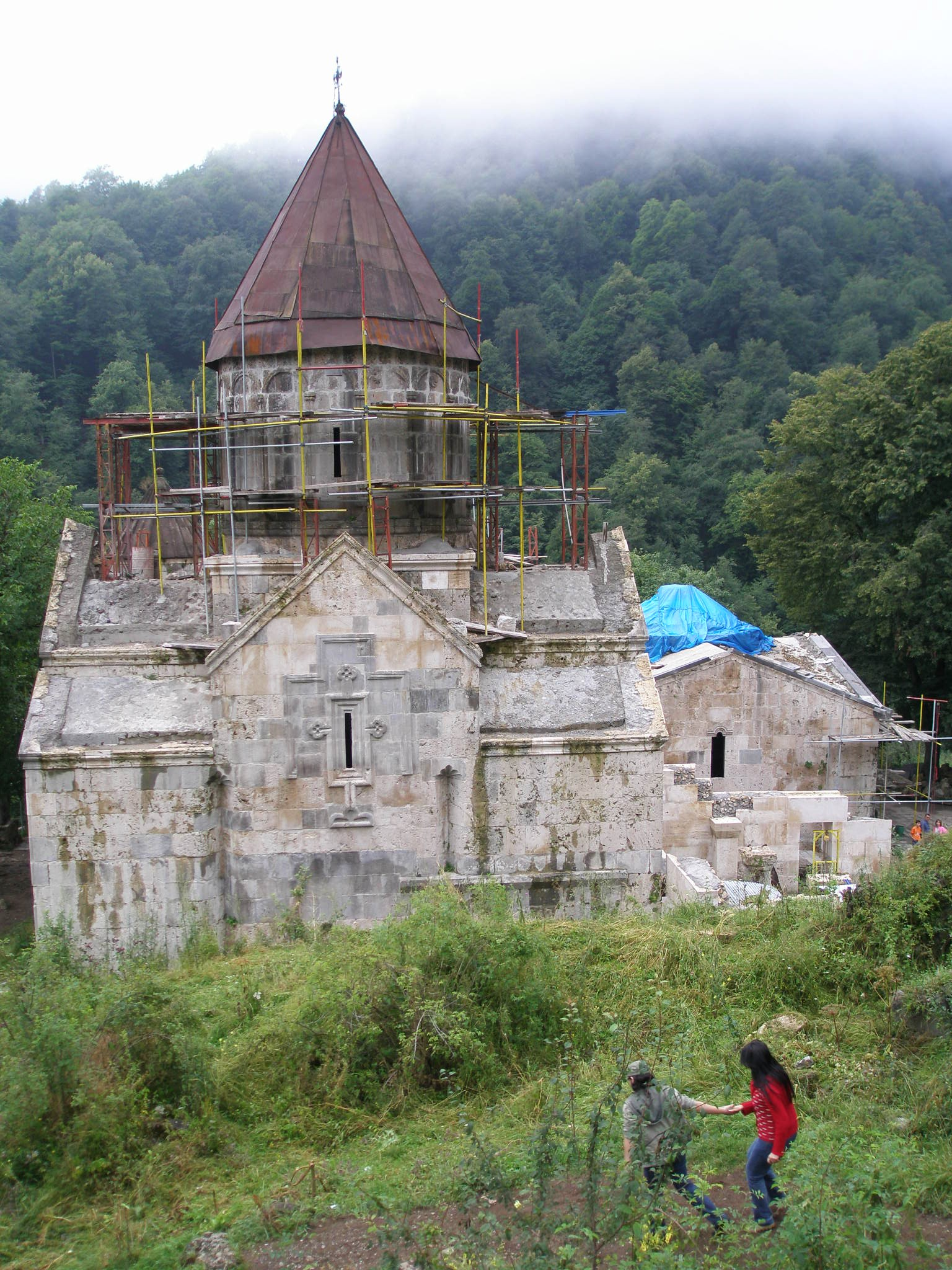
Haghartsin Monastery in the process of renovation (August 2009)

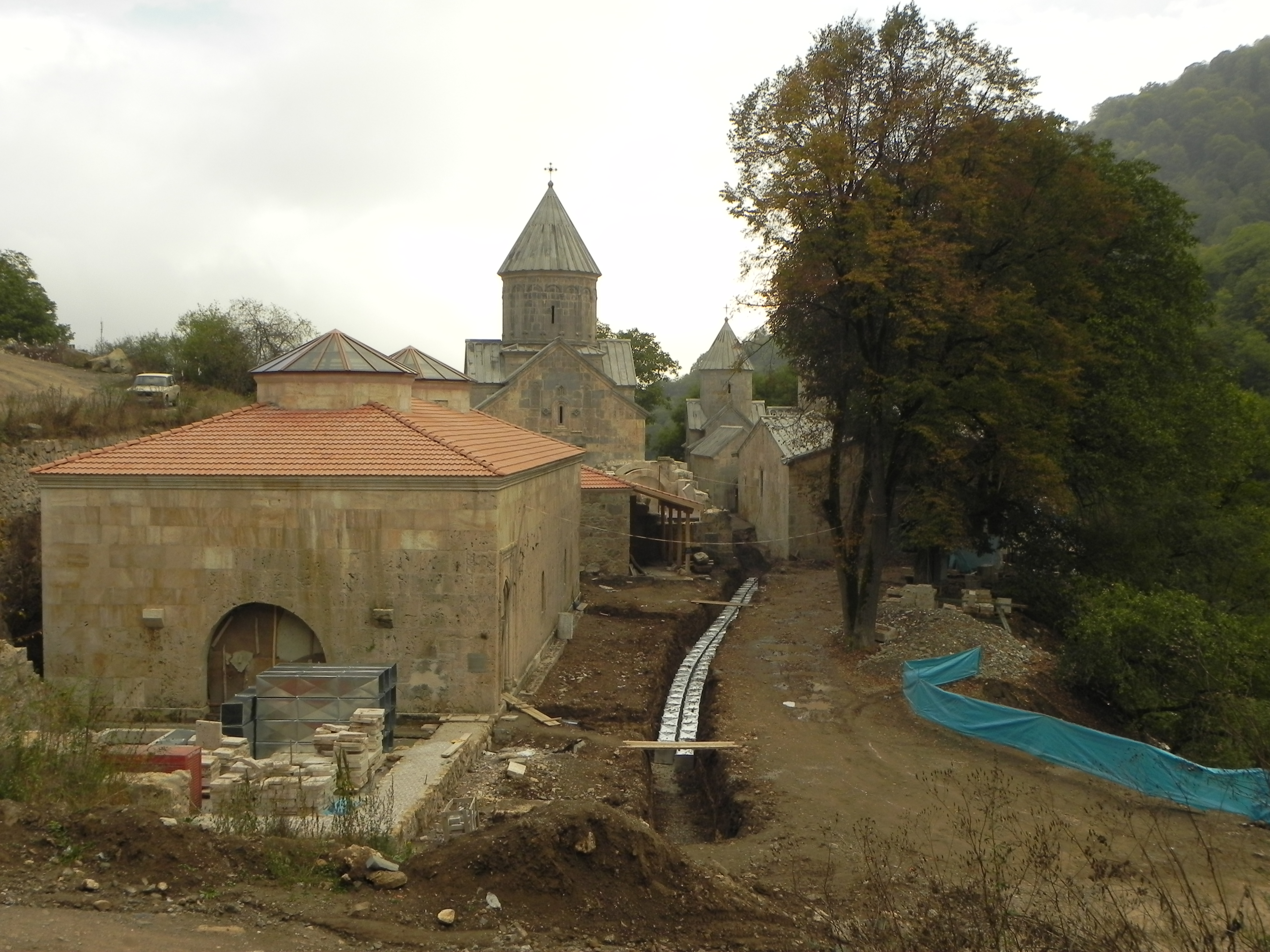
Haghartsin Monastery in the process of renovation (September 2010)

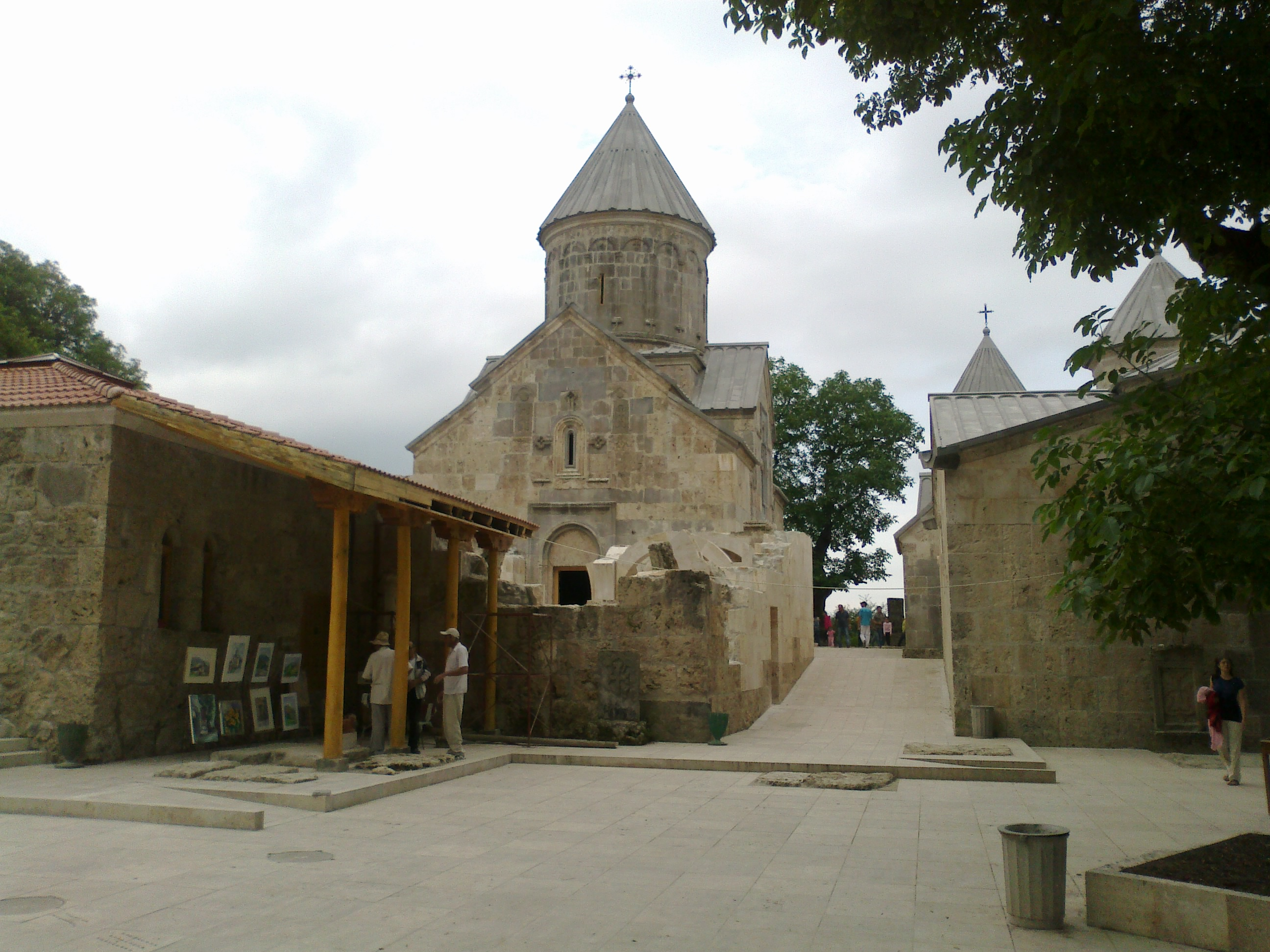
Haghartsin Monastery right by the end of the renovation process (August 2011)

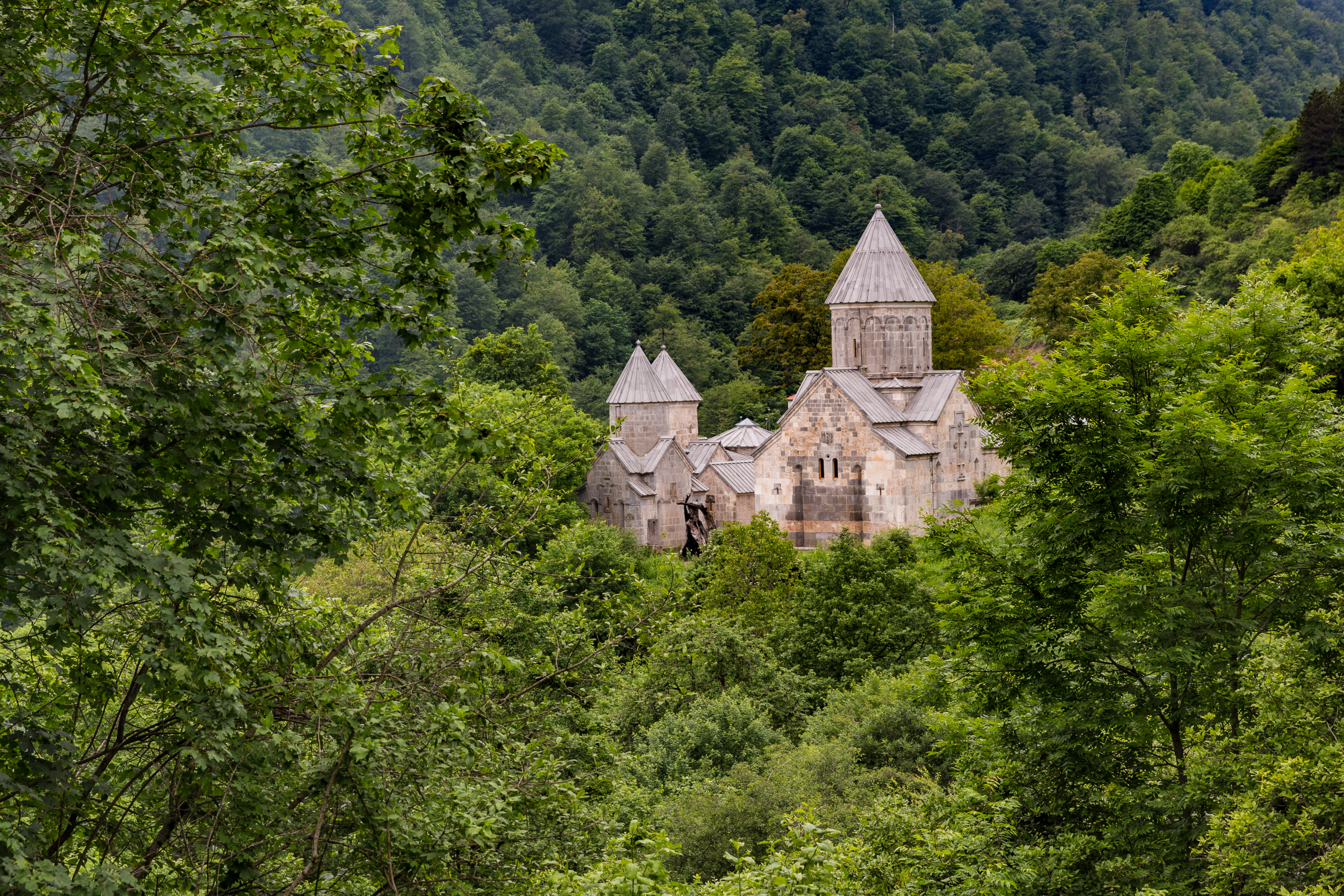
Haghartsin Monastery

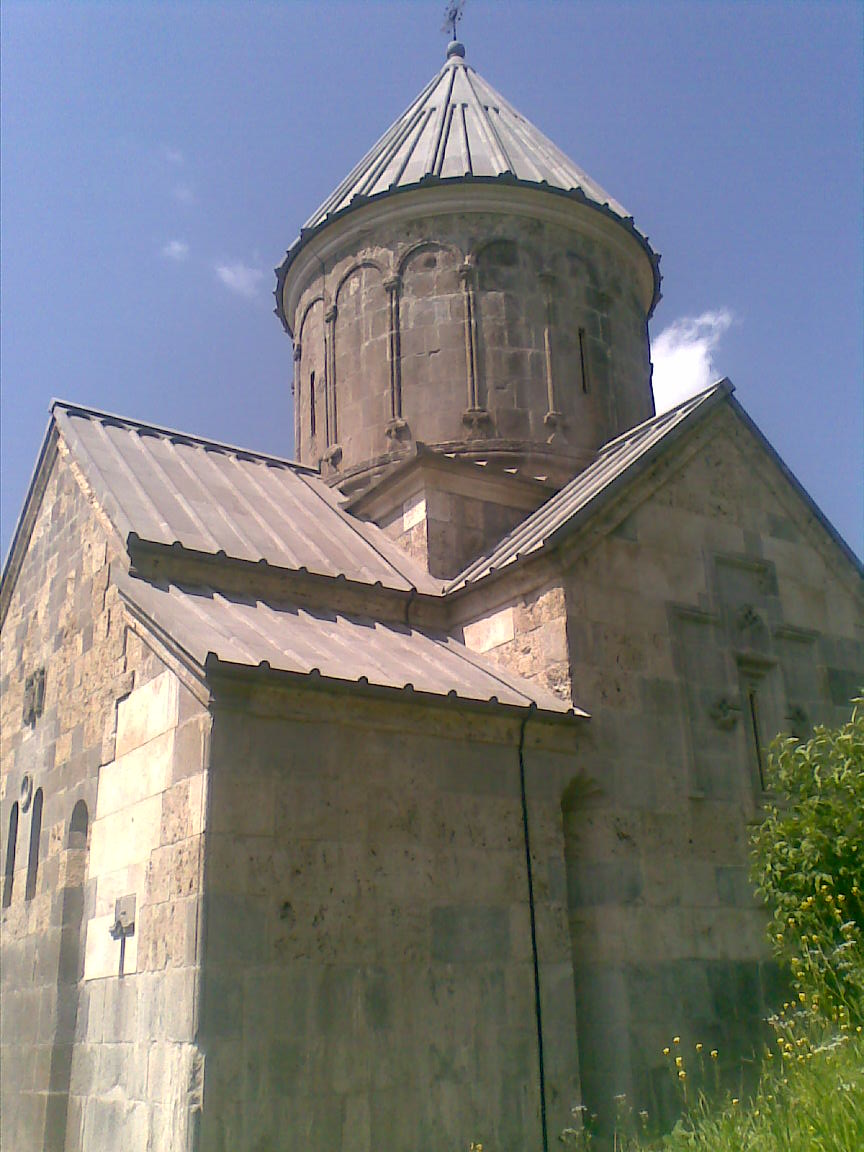
Surb Astvatsatsin (Mother of God Church) exterior

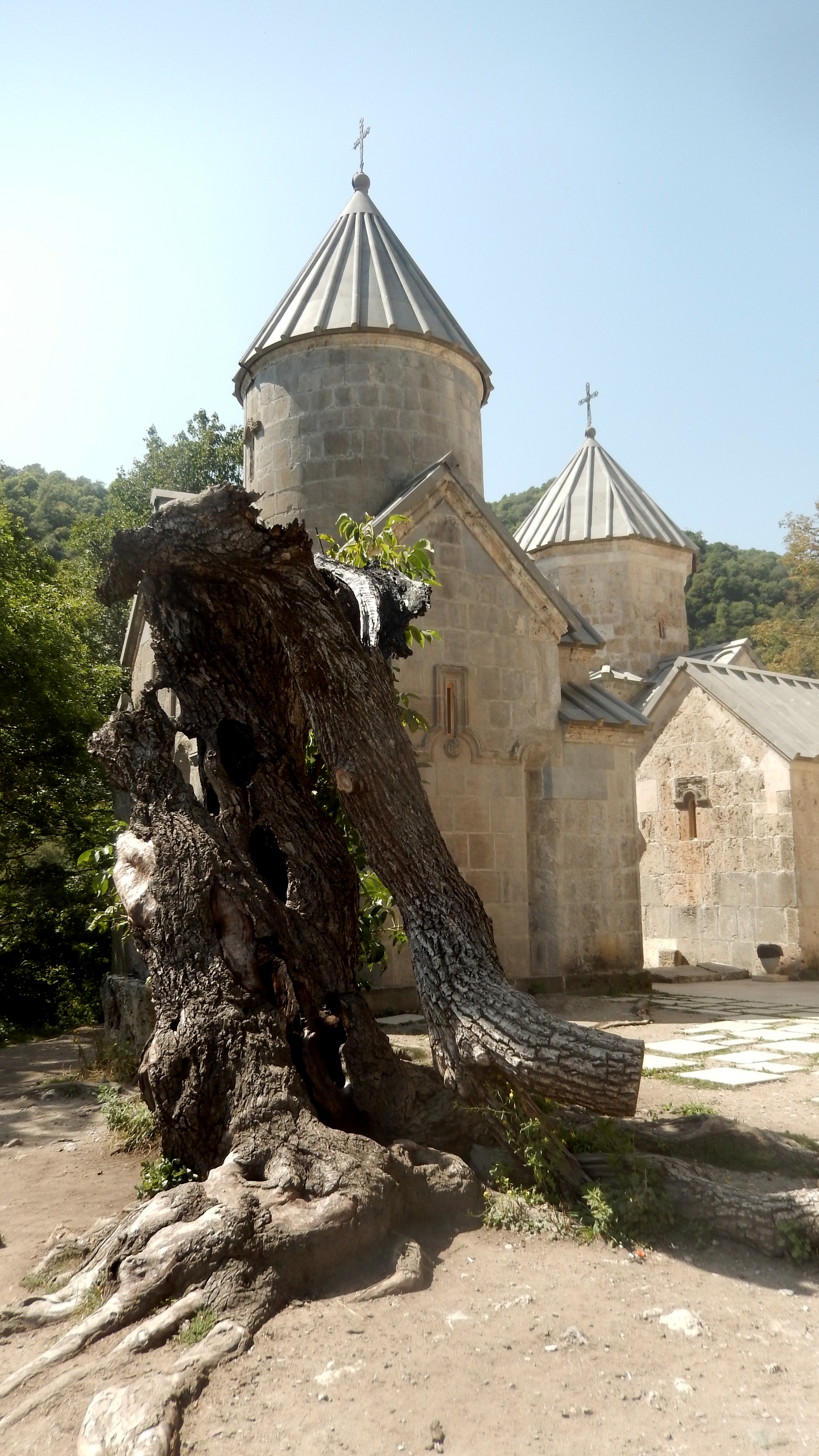
13th-century walnut tree destroyed by lightning in 2013

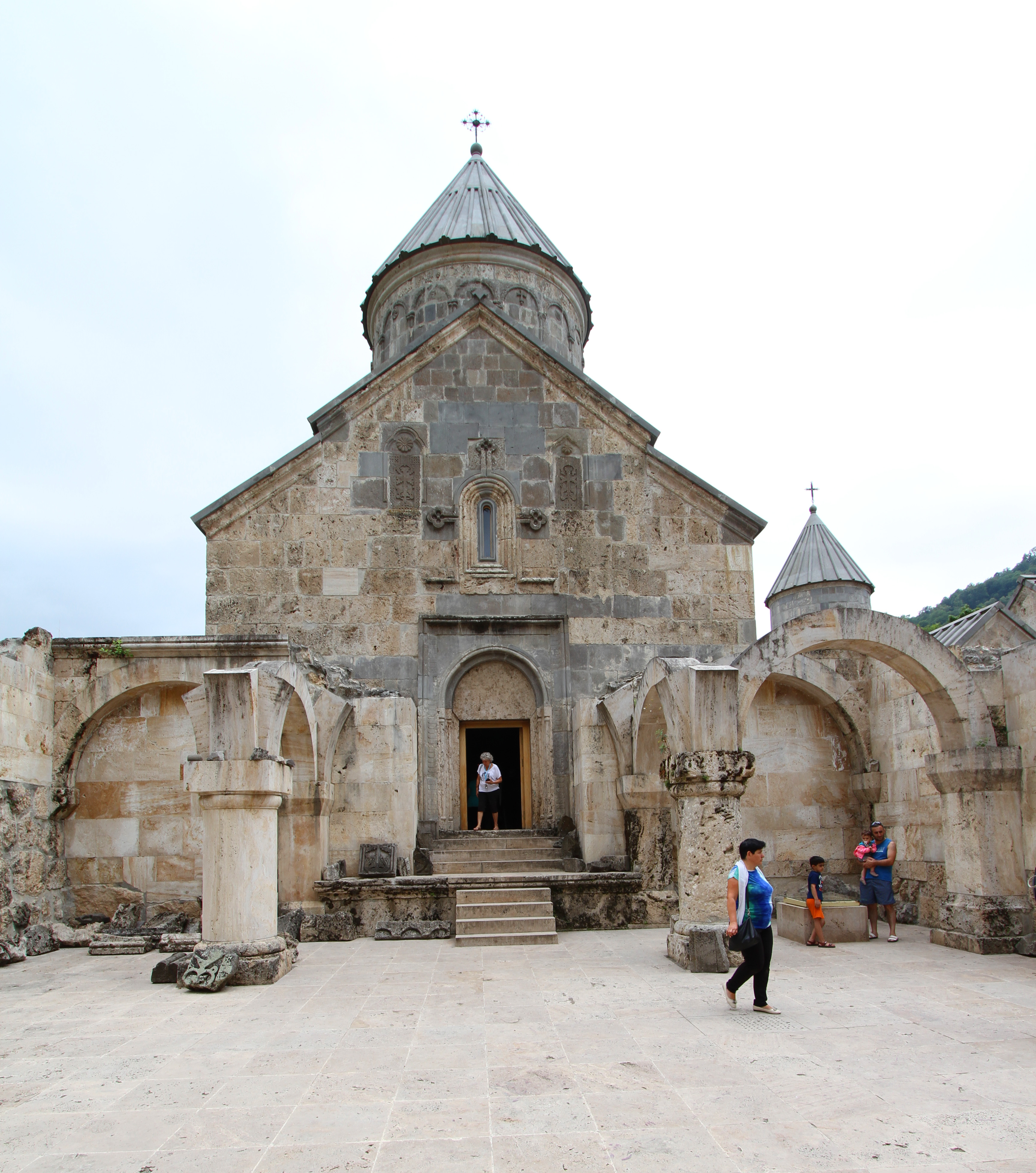
Church of the Holy Mother of God

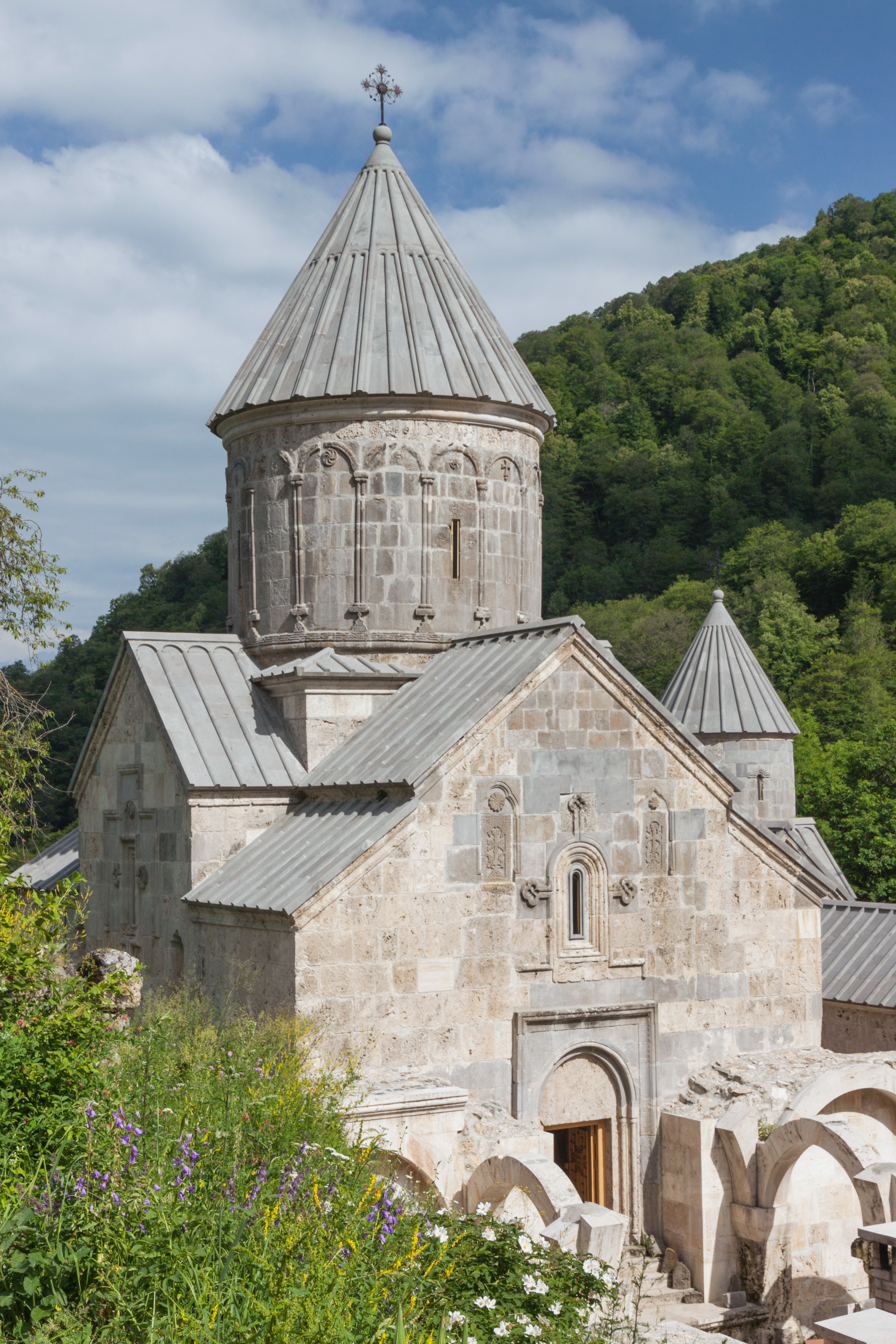
Holy Mother of God church

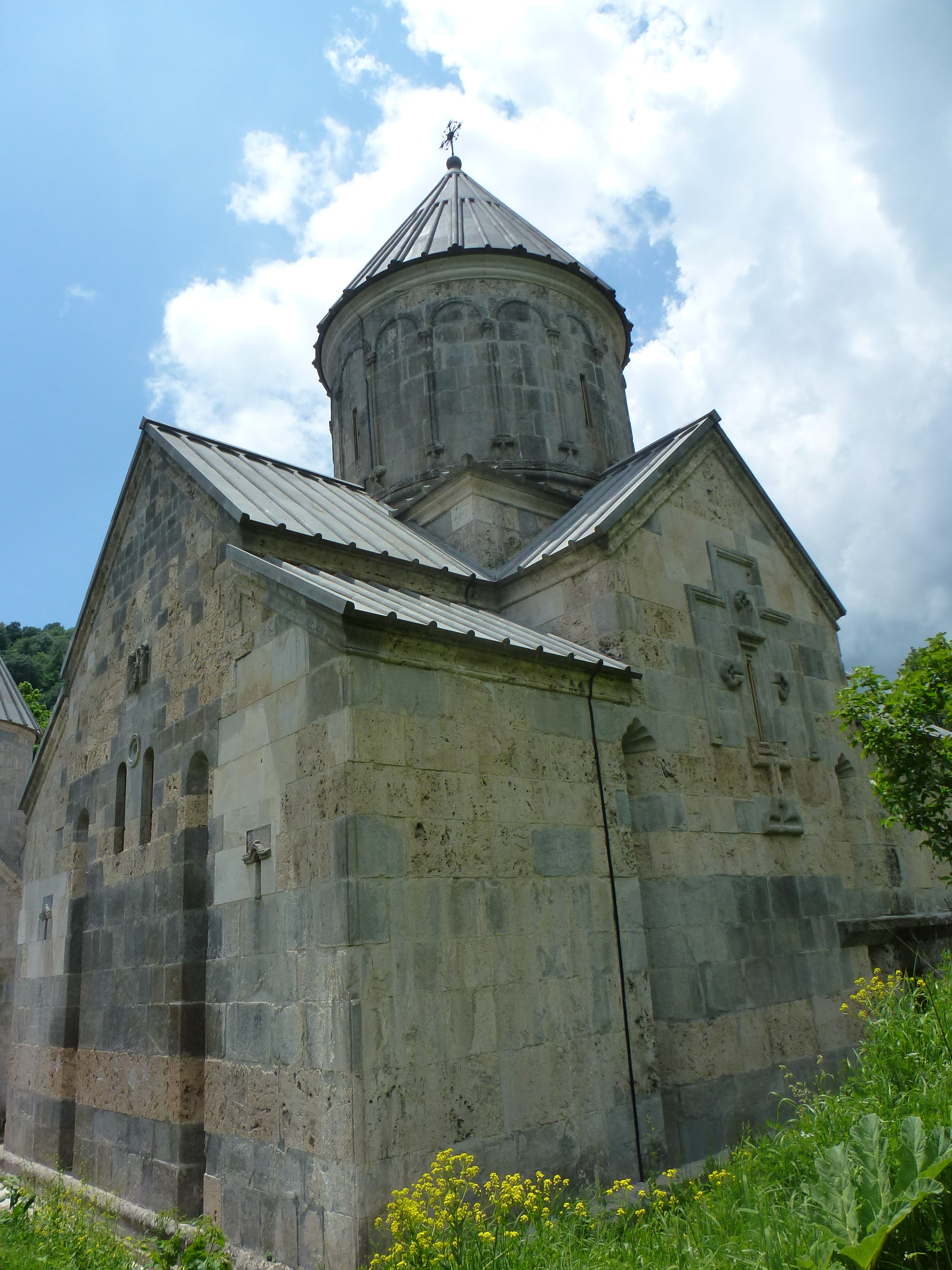
Holy Mother of God church

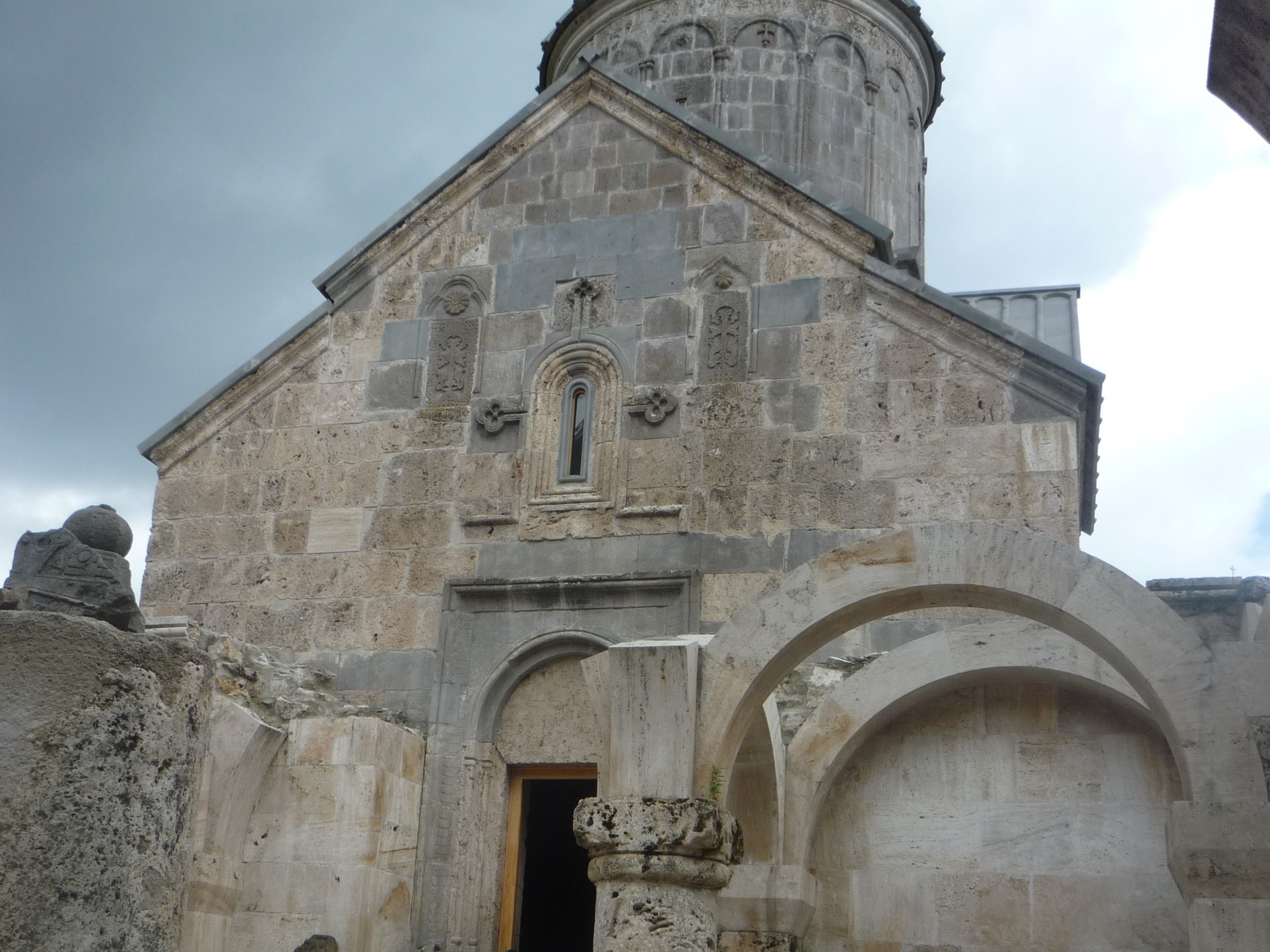

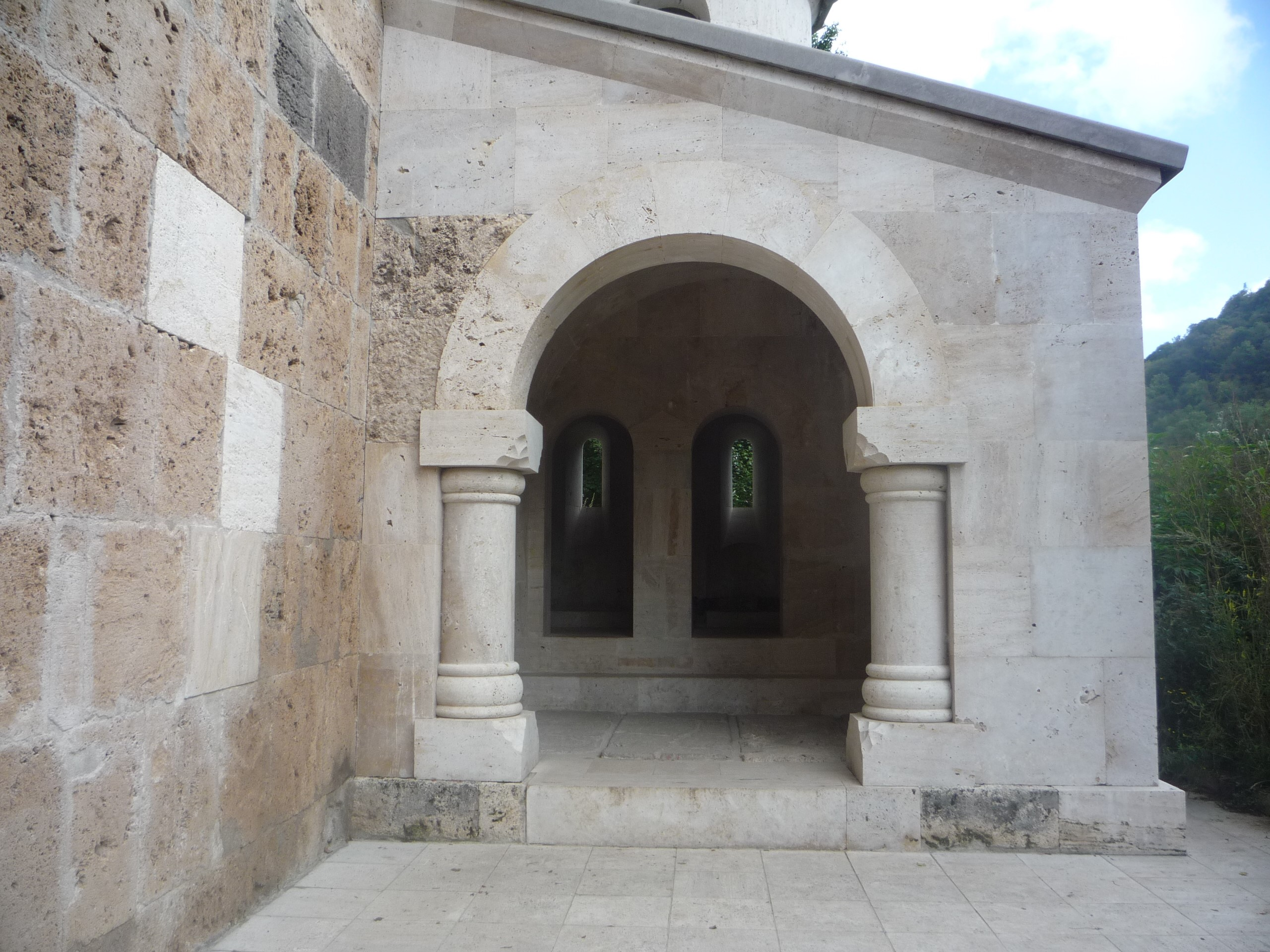

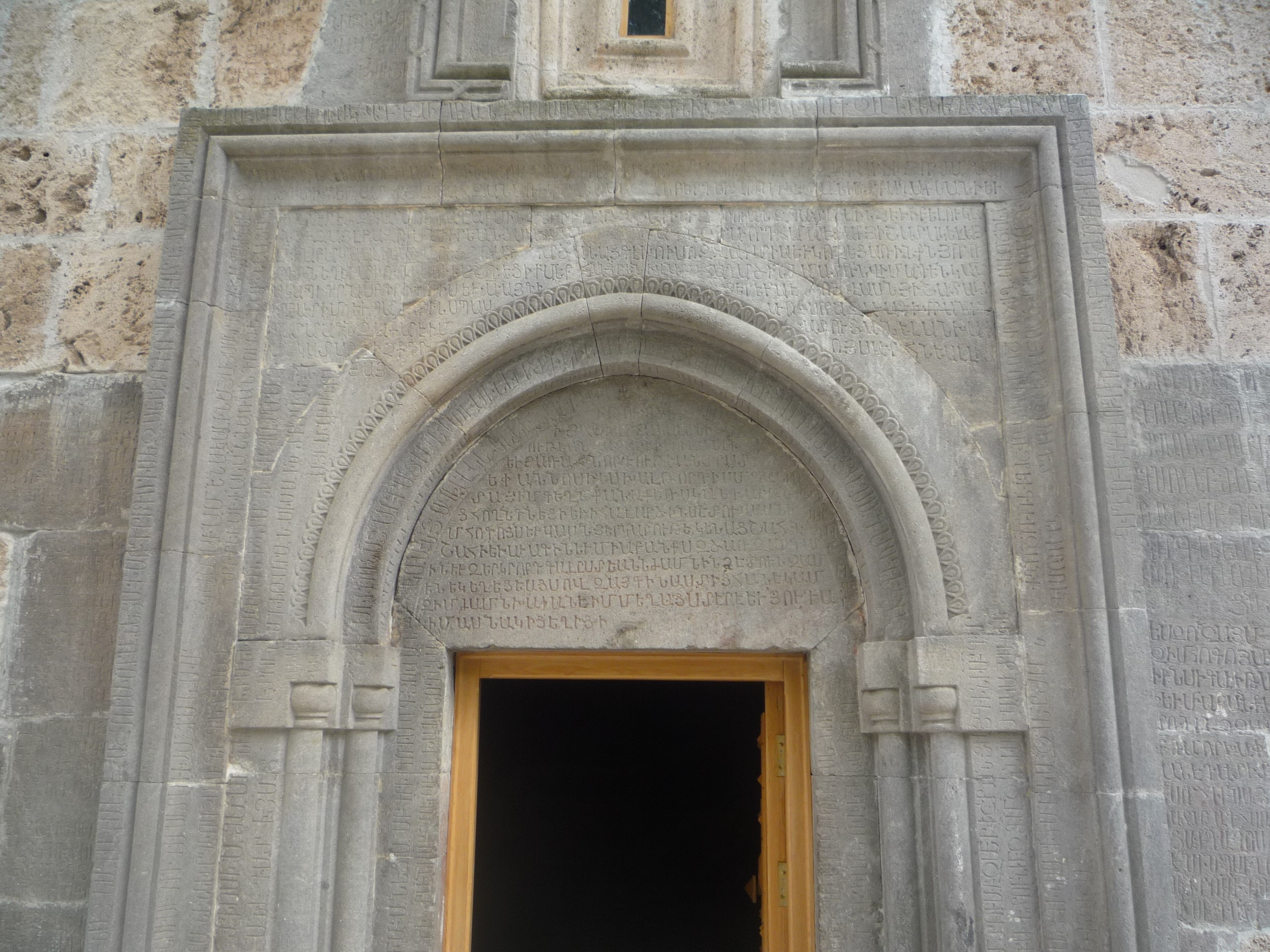

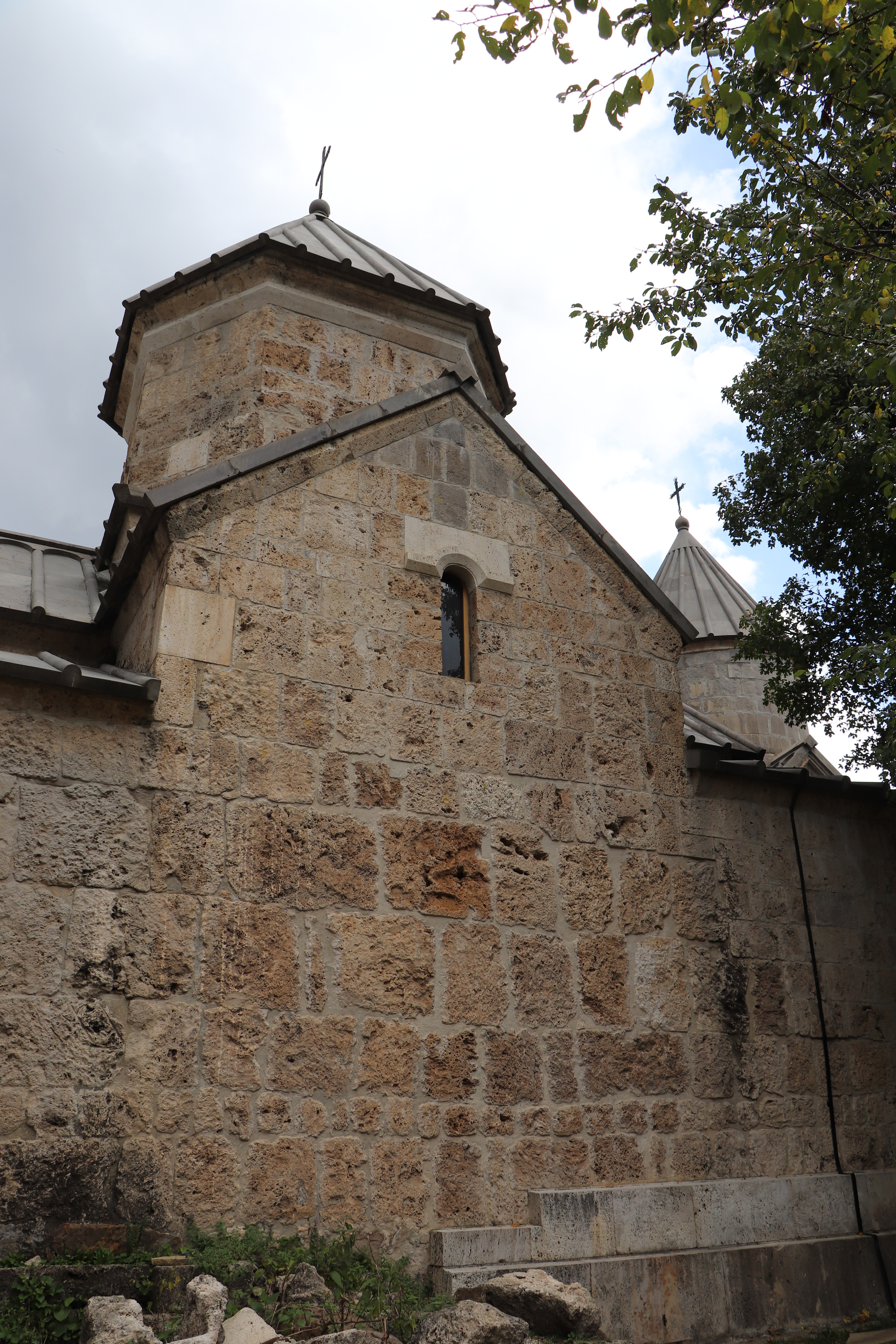

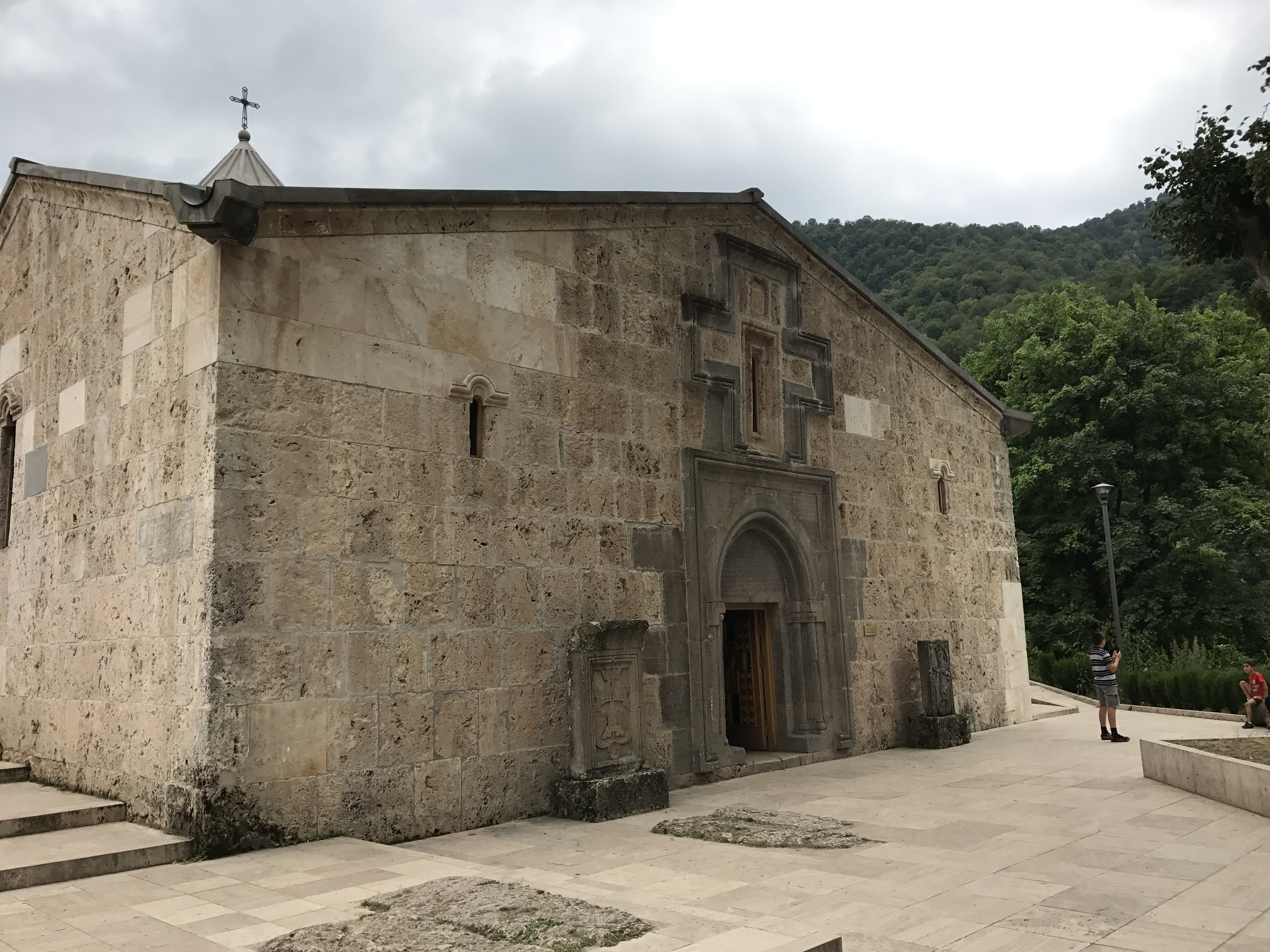

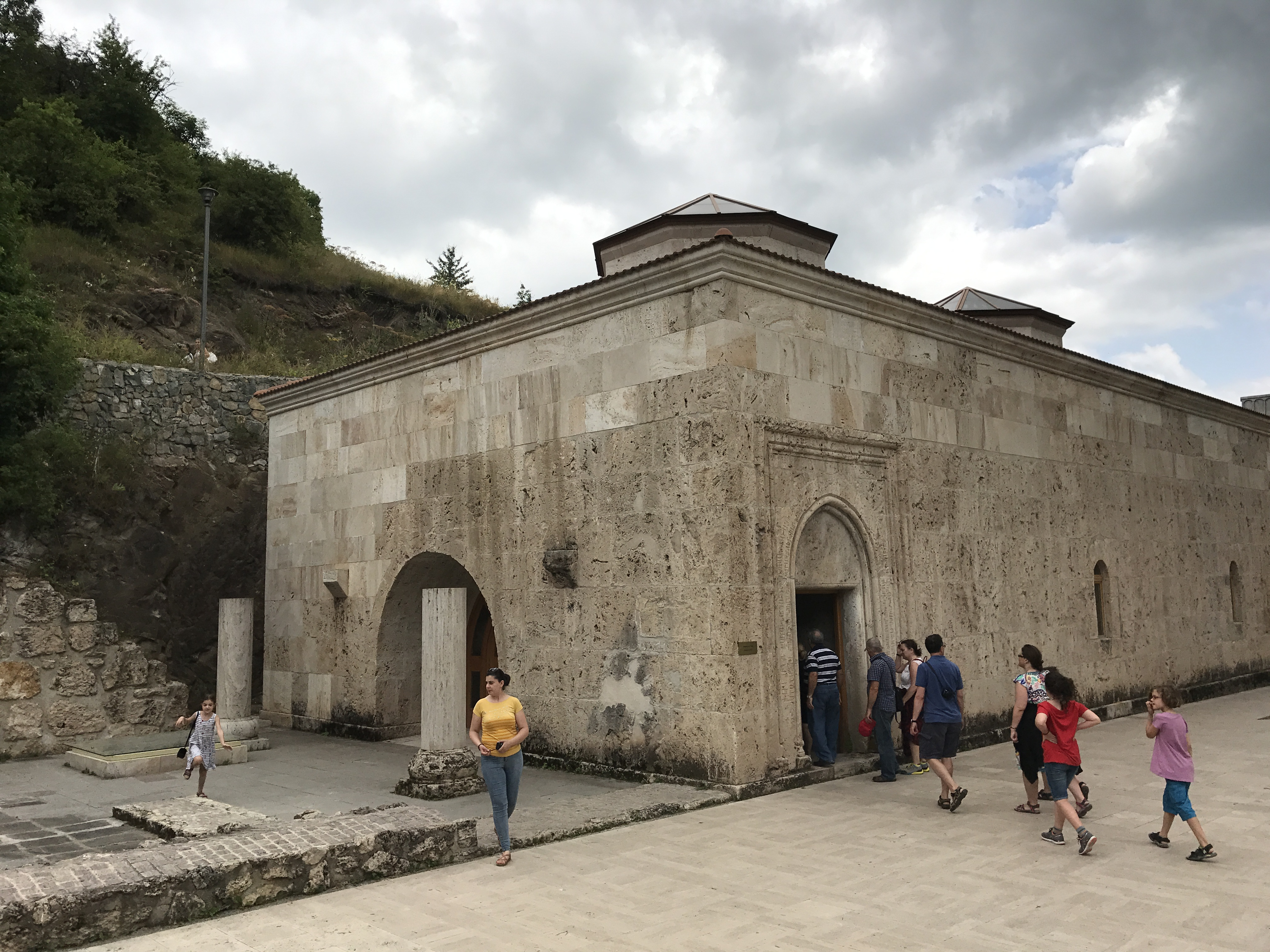

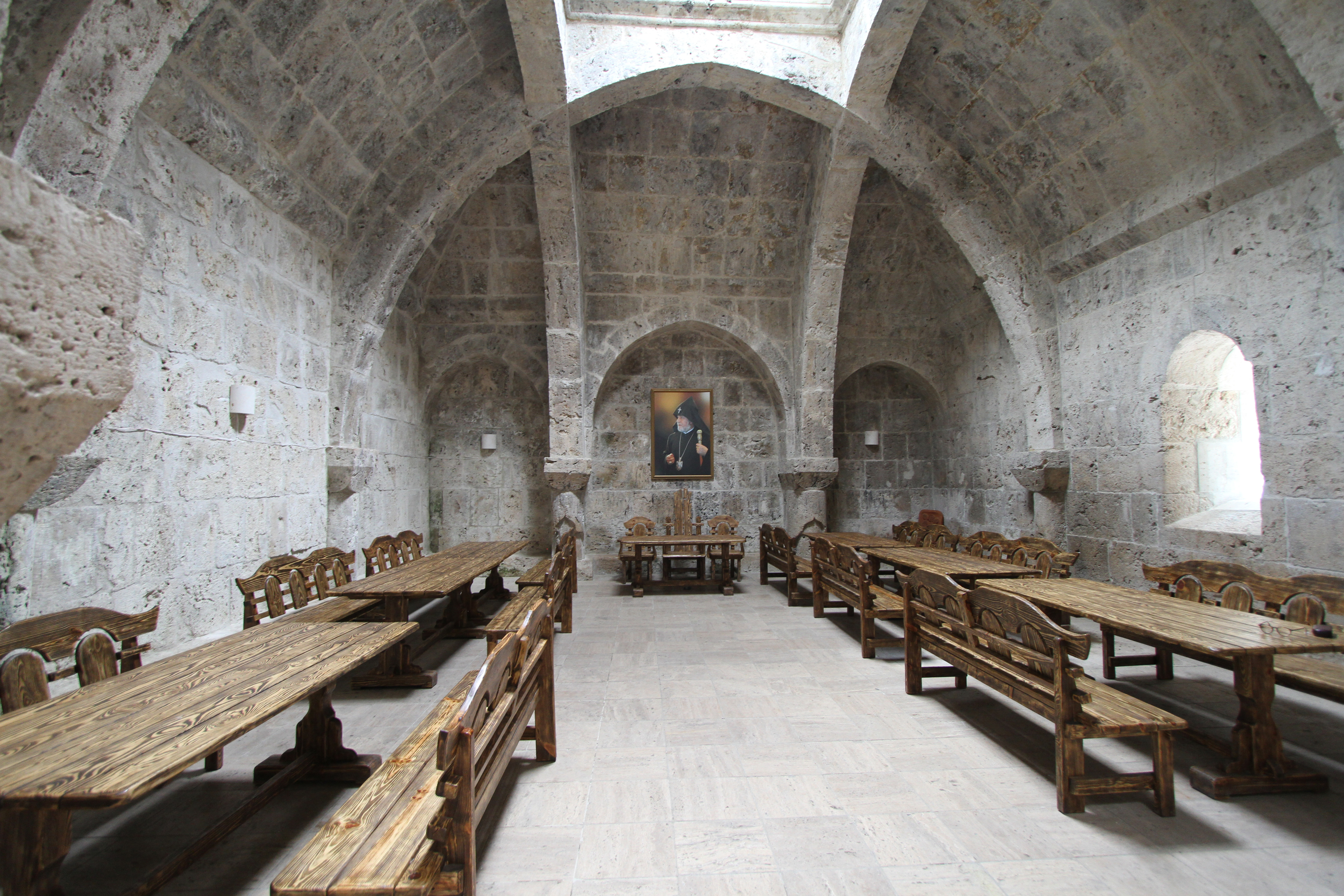

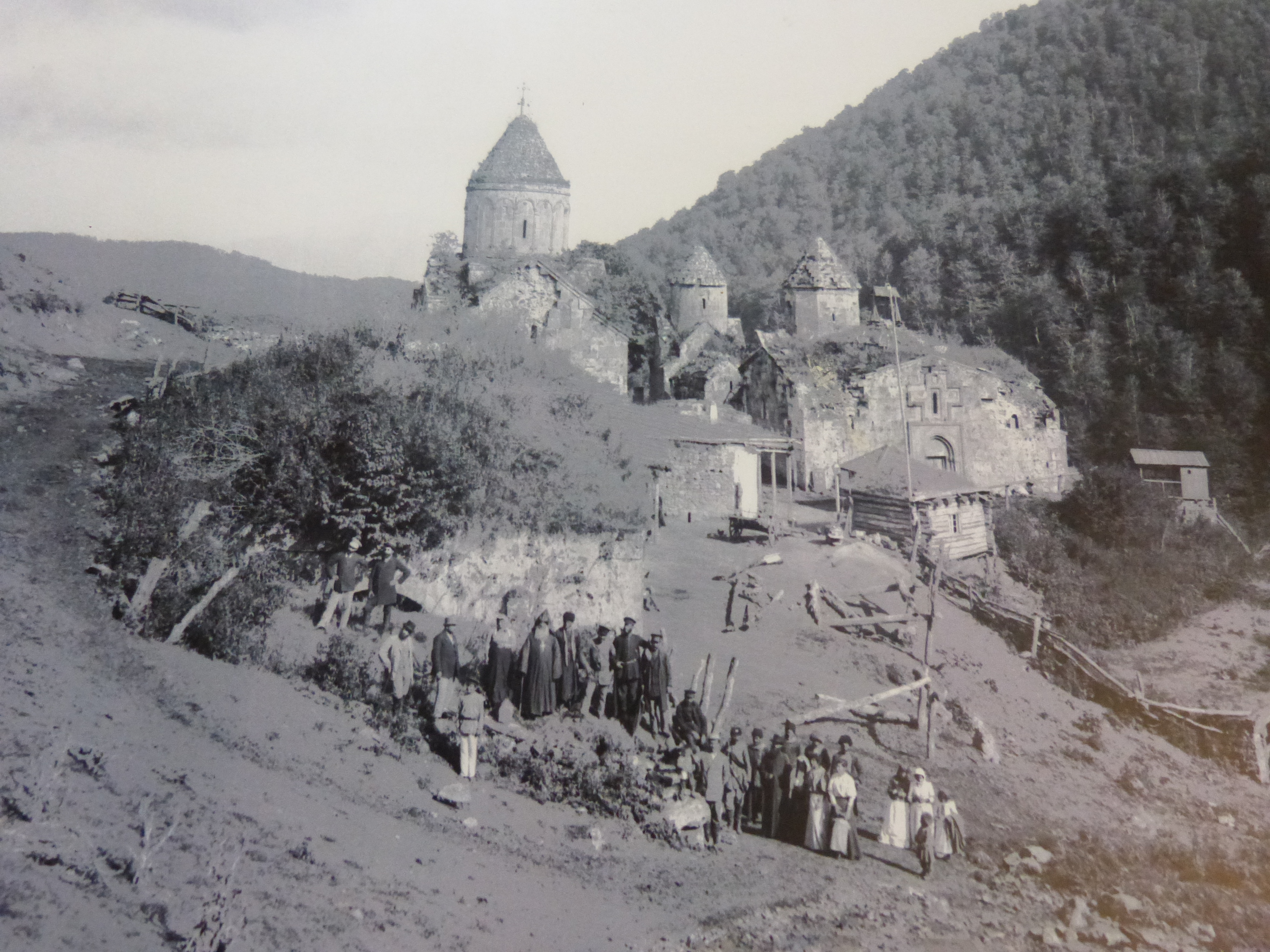
Haghartsin Monastery

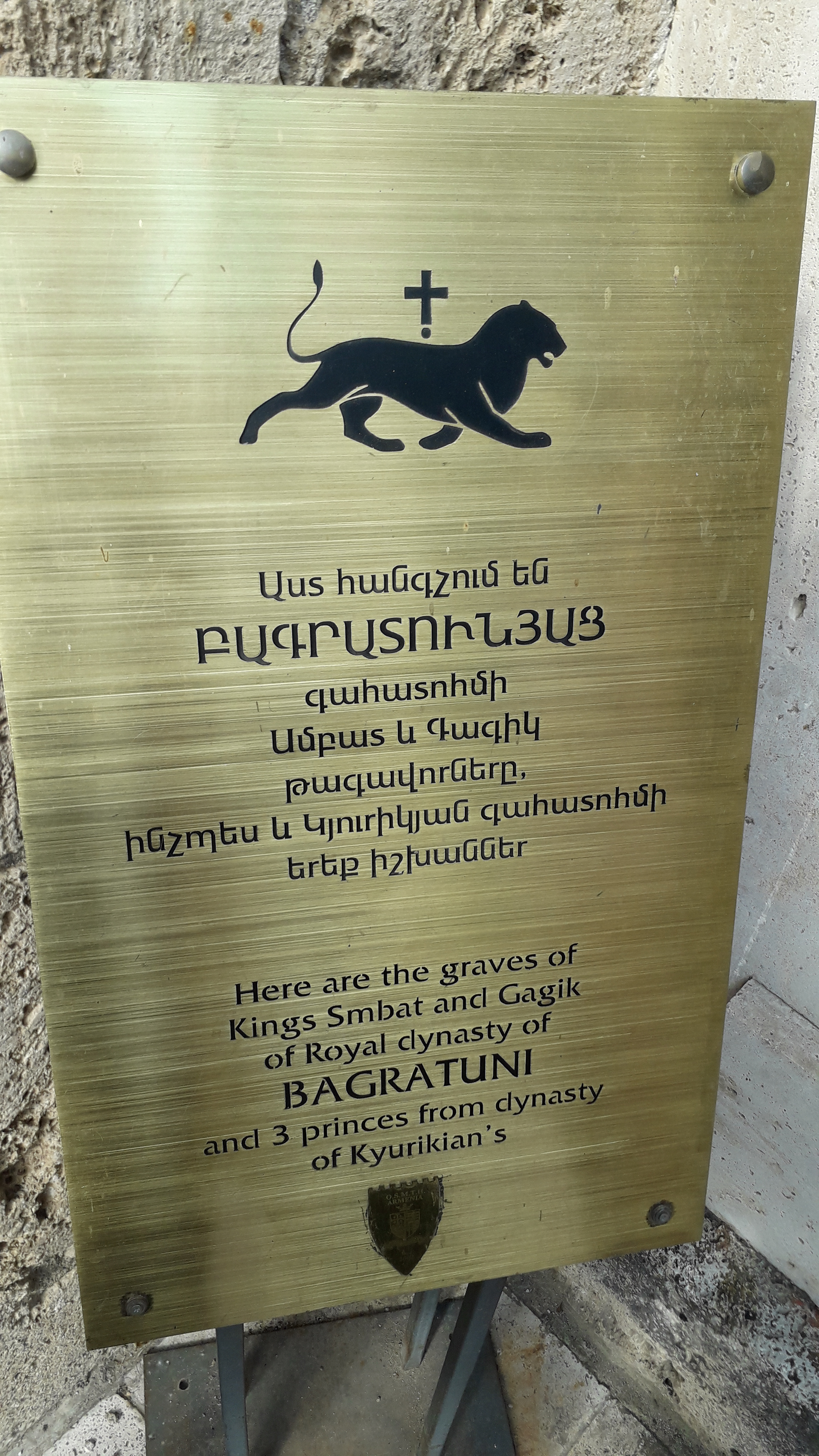
The inscription reads, "Here lie kings Smbat and Gagik of the Bagratuni royal dynasty, as well as three princes from the Kiurikian dynasty".

== Sources ==
- "Architectural Ensembles of Armenia", by O. Khalpakhchian, published in Moscow by Iskusstvo Publishers in 1980.
- "Rediscovering Armenia Guidebook", by Brady Kiesling and Raffi Kojian, published online and printed in 2005.
