= Armenian eternity sign =

Ancient Armenian national symbol

Armenian Sun Cross (Arevakhach)

The Armenian eternity sign (⟨֎ ֍⟩, Armenian: Հավերժության նշան, romanized: haverzhut’yan nshan) or Arevakhach’ (Արեւախաչ, "Sun Cross") is an ancient Armenian national symbol and a symbol of the national identity of the Armenians. It is one of the most common symbols in Armenian architecture, carved on khachkars and on walls of churches.

== Evolution and use ==
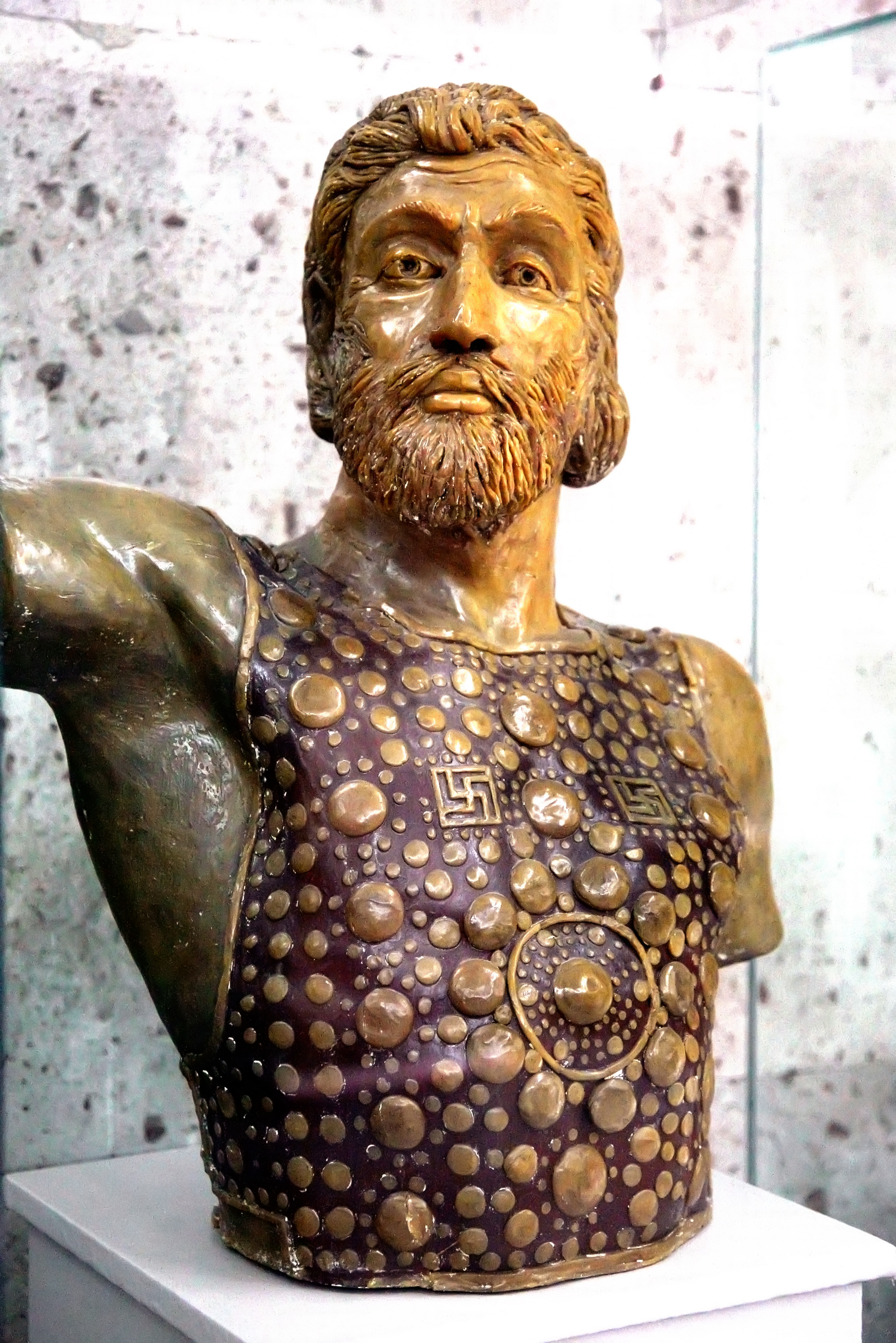
Armenian soldier from Lchashen, 15-14th centuries BC. Reconstructed by Prof. A. D. Tchagharian in Sardarabat Museum

In medieval Armenian culture, the eternity sign symbolized the concept of everlasting, celestial life. From the 1st century BC, it appeared on Armenian steles; later it became part of khachkar symbolism. Around the 8th century the use of the Armenian symbol of eternity had become a long established national iconographical practice, and it has kept its meaning in modern times. Besides being one of the main components of khachkars, it can be found on church walls, tomb stones and other architectural monuments. Notable churches with the eternity sign include the Mashtots Hayrapet Church of Garni, Horomayr Monastery, Nor Varagavank, Tsitsernavank Monastery. An identical symbol appears in the reliefs of the Divriği Great Mosque and Hospital, and is likely a borrowing from earlier Armenian churches of the area. It can also be found on Armenian manuscripts.

The eternity sign is used on the logos of government agencies and on commemorative coins, as well as Armenian government agencies and non-government organizations and institutions in Armenia and the Armenian diaspora.

The symbol is also used by Armenian neopagan organizations and their followers. It is called by them "Arevakhach" (Արեւախաչ, "sun cross").

== ArmSCII and Unicode ==
The right- and left-facing Armeternity unicode font glyphs

In ArmSCII, Armenian Standard Code for Information Interchange, an Armenian eternity sign has been encoded in 7-bit and 8-bit standard and ad hoc encodings since at least 1987. In 2010 the Armenian National Institute of Standards suggested encoding an Armenian Eternity sign in the Unicode character set, and both left-facing ⟨֎⟩ and right-facing ⟨֍⟩ Armenian eternity signs were included in Unicode version 7.0 when it was released in June 2014.

Font glyphs

Regular

Italic

Bold

Bold Italic

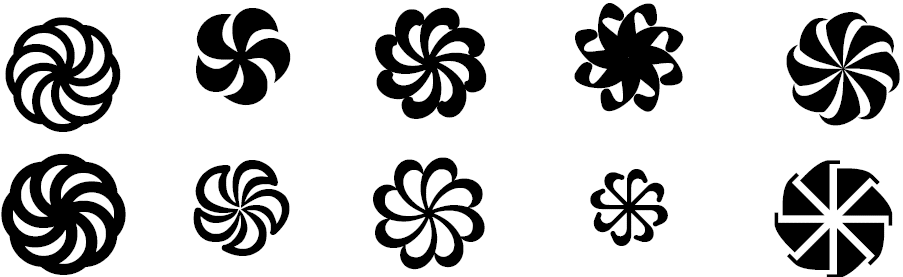

== Gallery ==
Churches

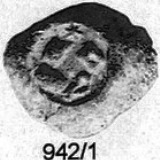
Arevakhach from Dvin

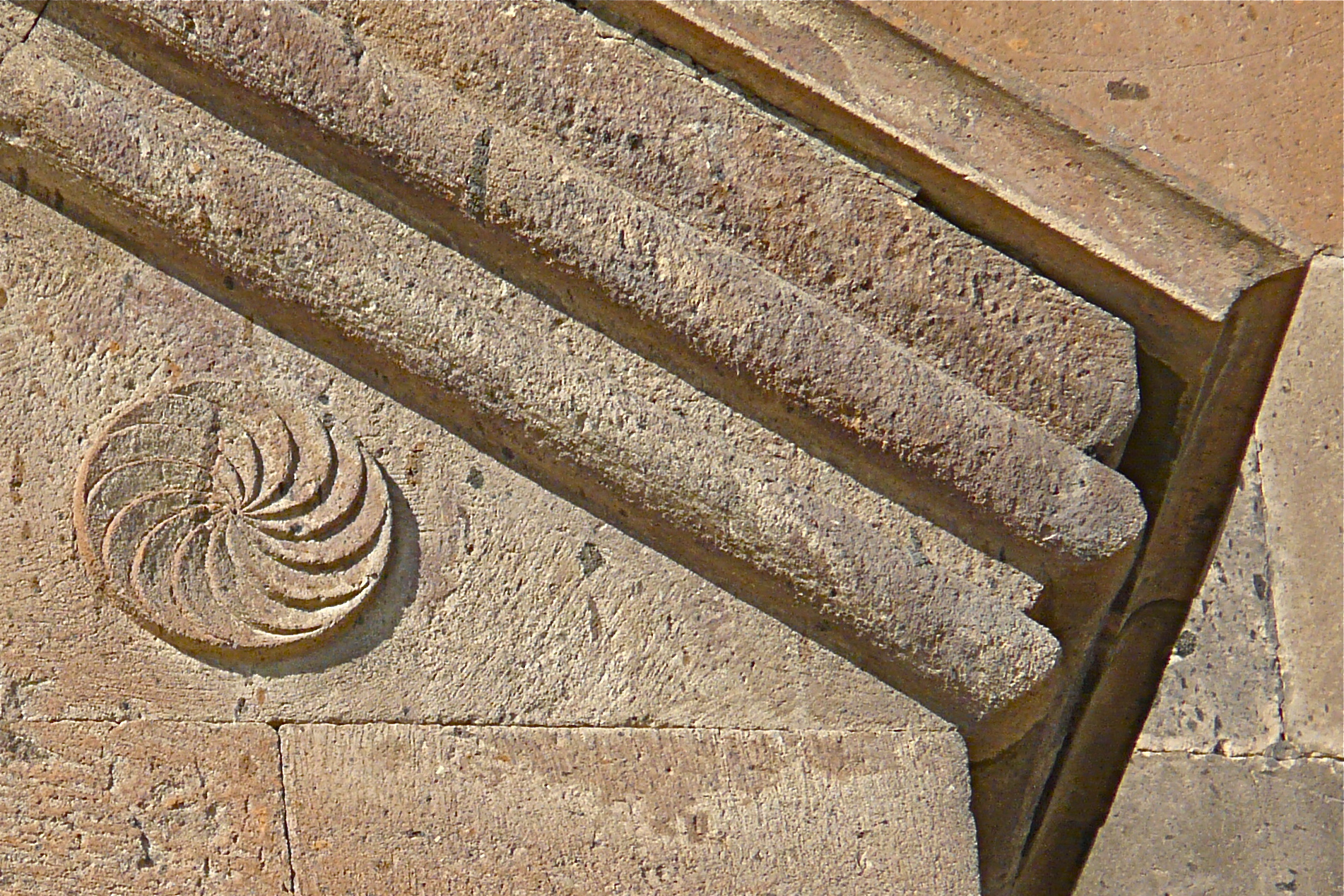
Saint Hripsime Church, Vagharshapat (7th century)

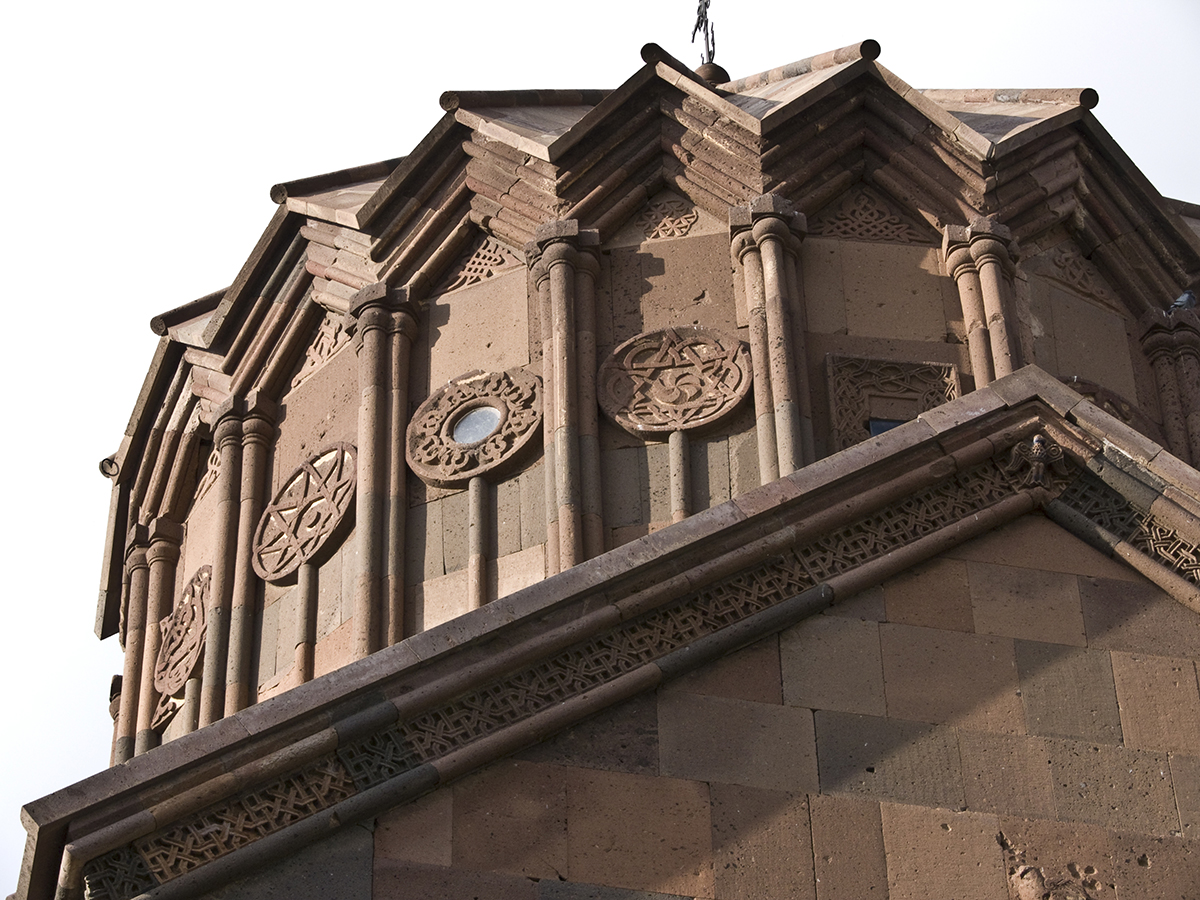
5-arched eternity sign on the Cathedral of the Holy Mother of God, Harichavank Monastery, near Artik (13th-century)

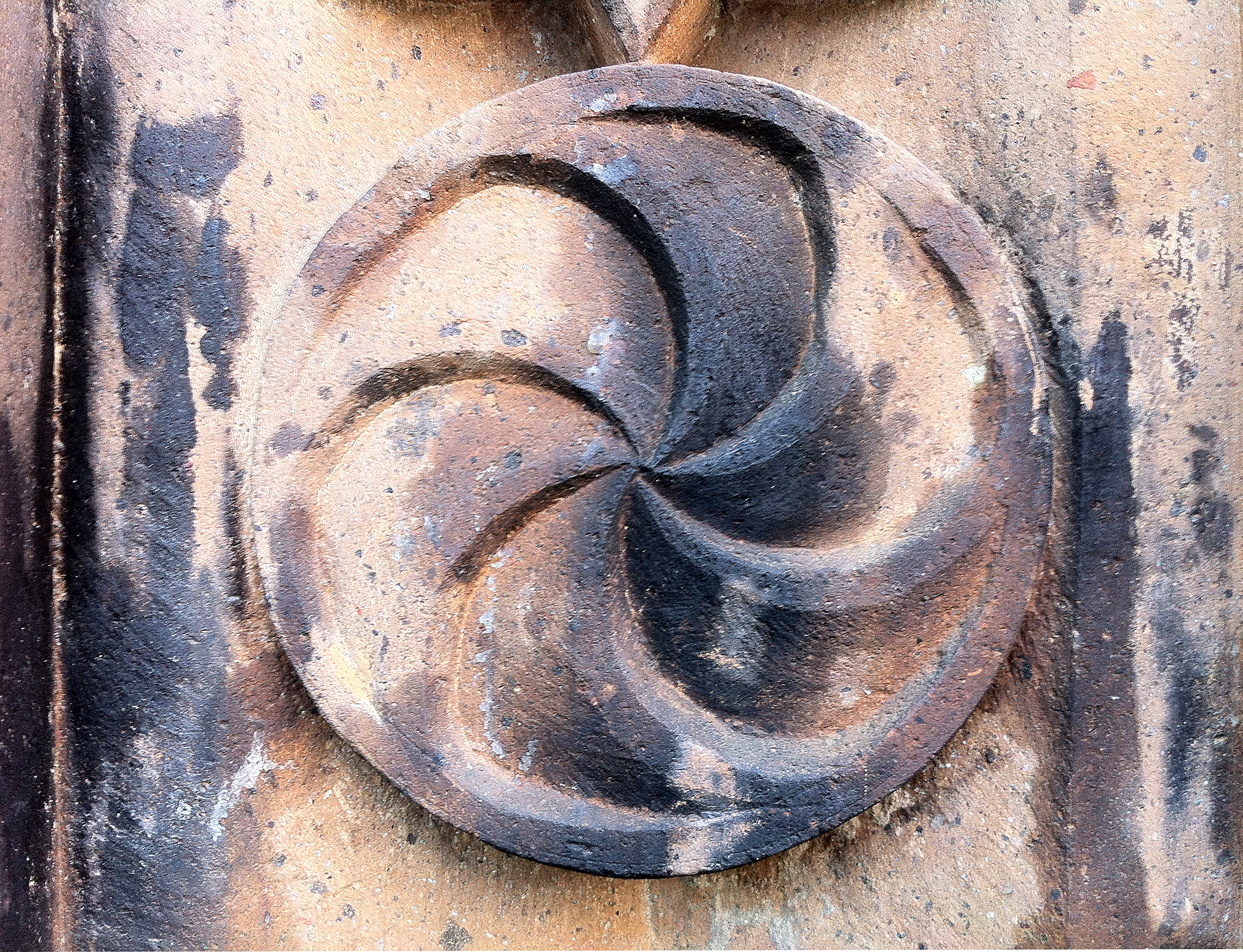
Makaravank, near Achajur (10th century)

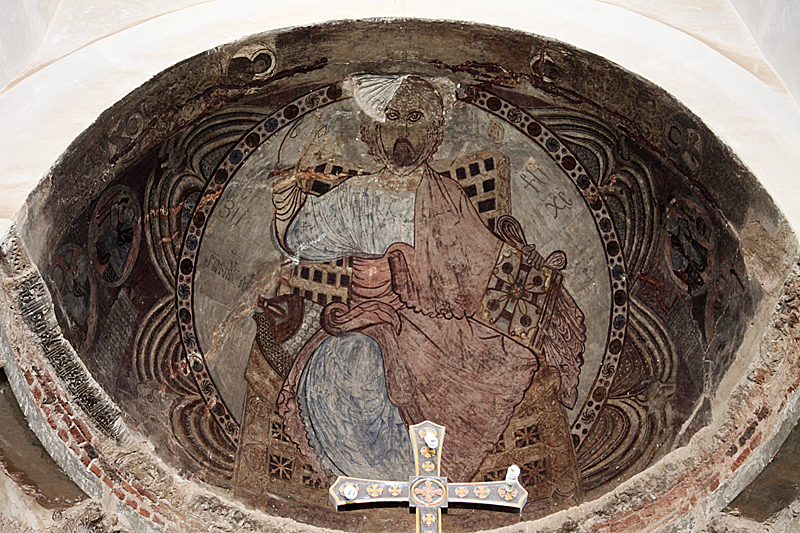
18 eternity signs on Armenian fresco of the Coptic White Monastery in Egypt, 12th century

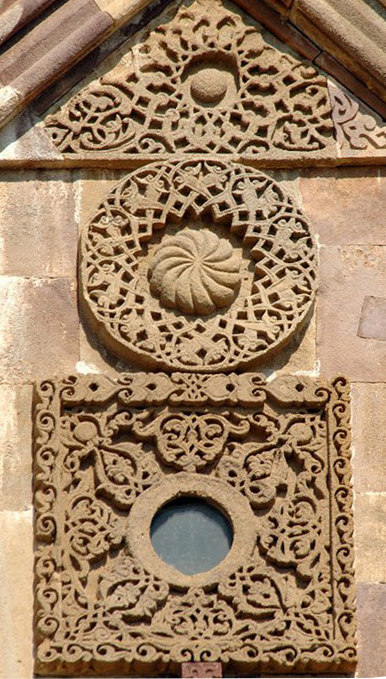
Gandzasar monastery, 13th century

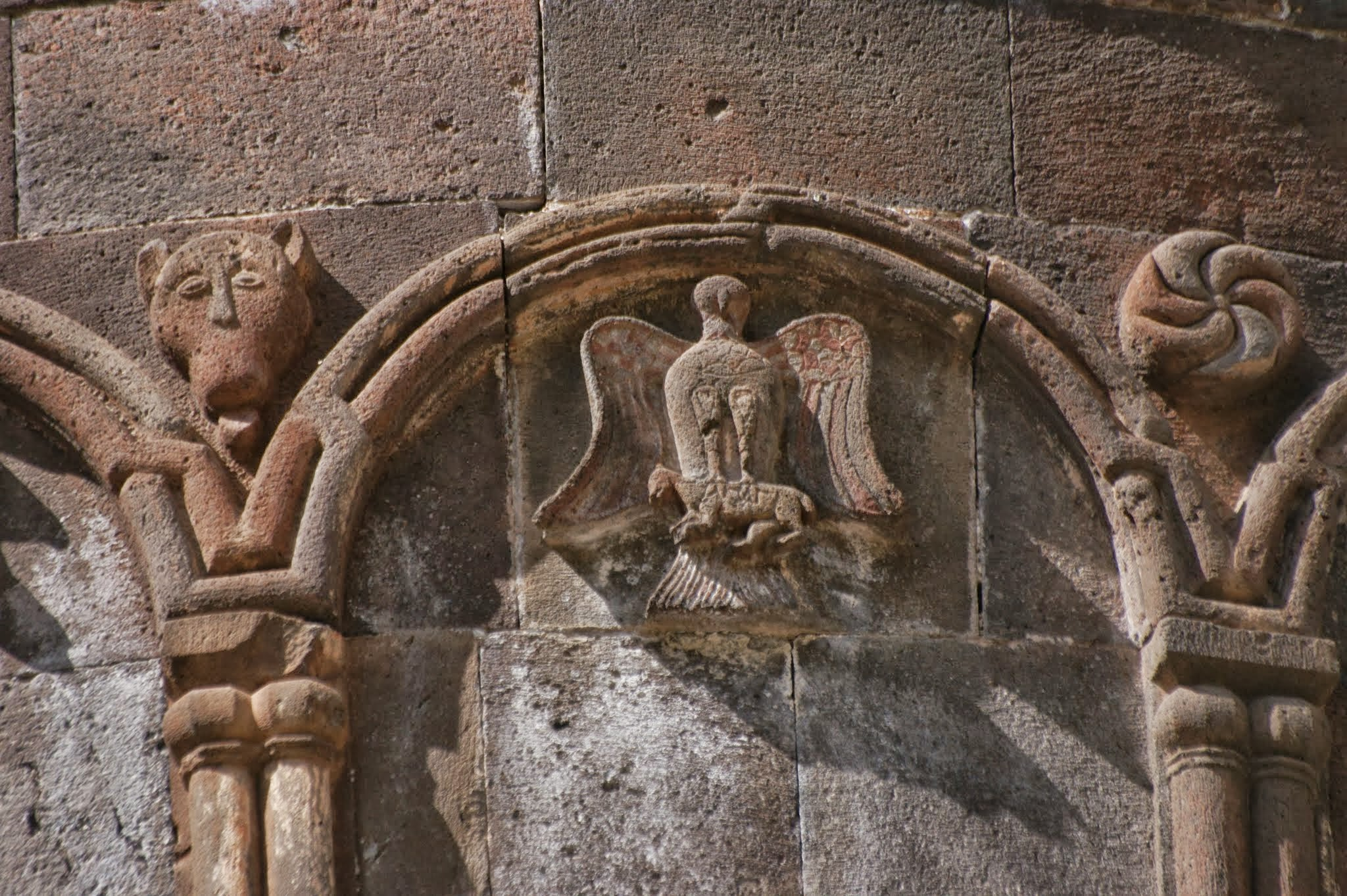
Geghard, 13th century

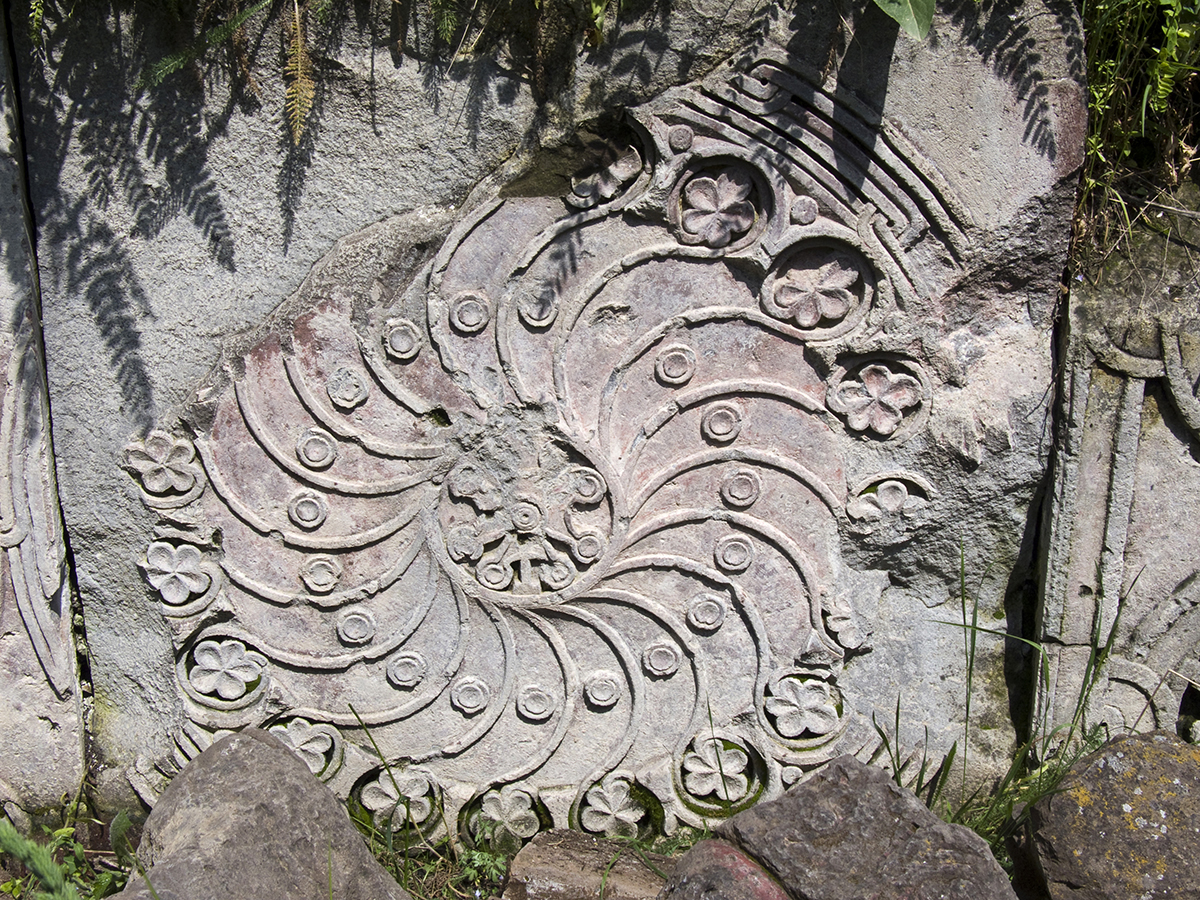
Decor of Teghenyats Monastery

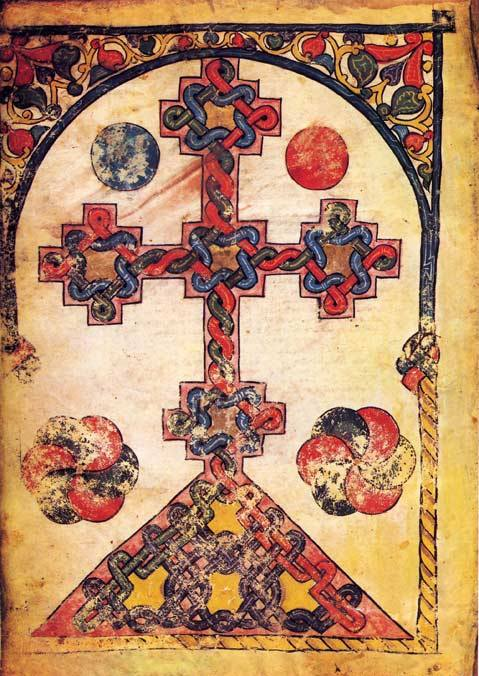
Miniature in Gospel by Stepanos, 1201

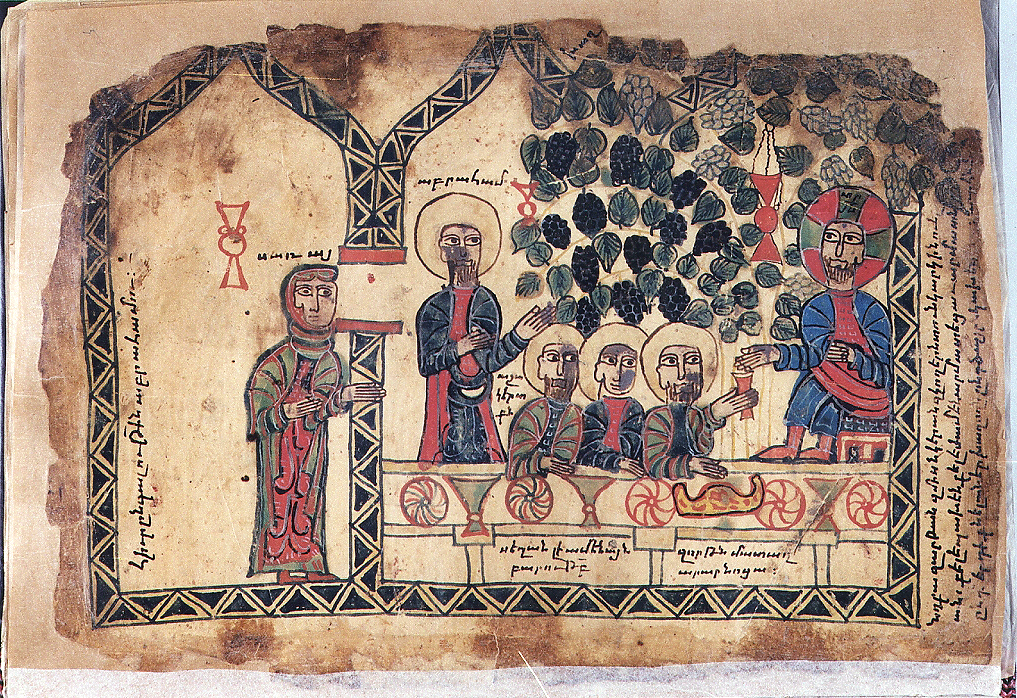
Illuminated manuscript by Hovsian, 1316

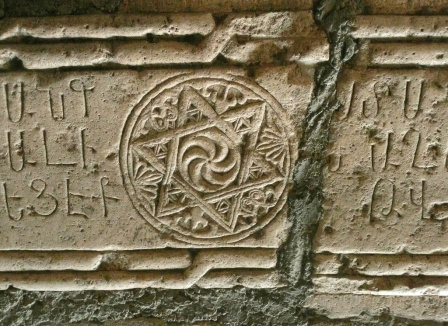
Grand prince Hasan Jalal Vahtangian, 1214–1261

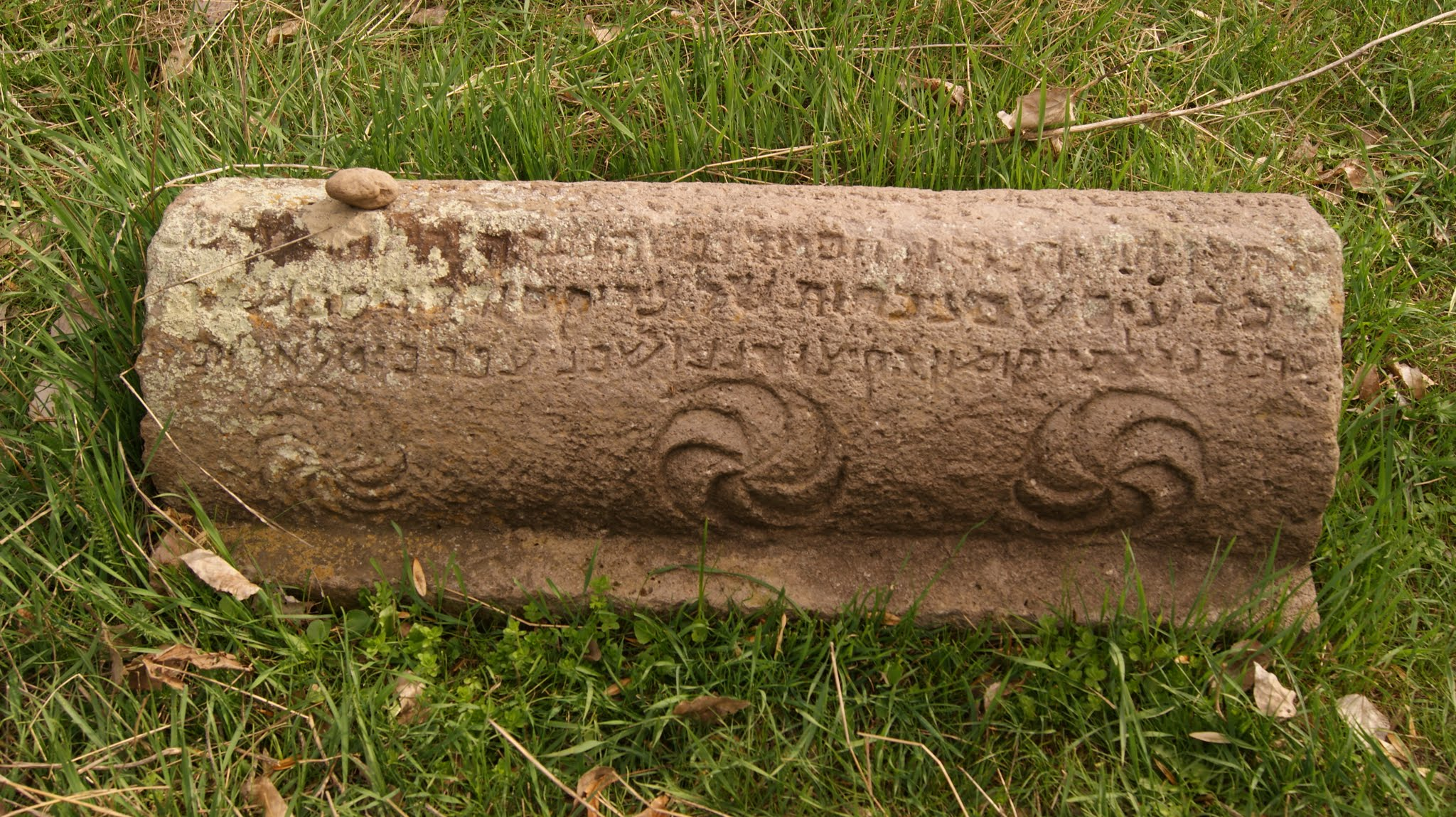
Jewish cemetery in Yeghegis, 13th century

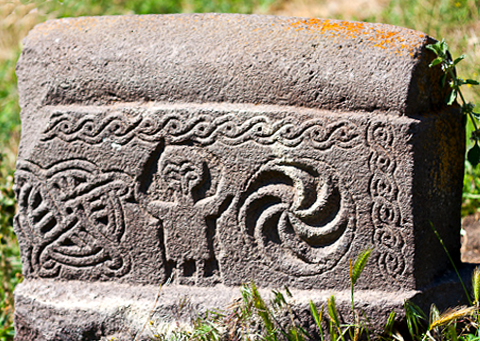
Aghout cemetery in Sisian

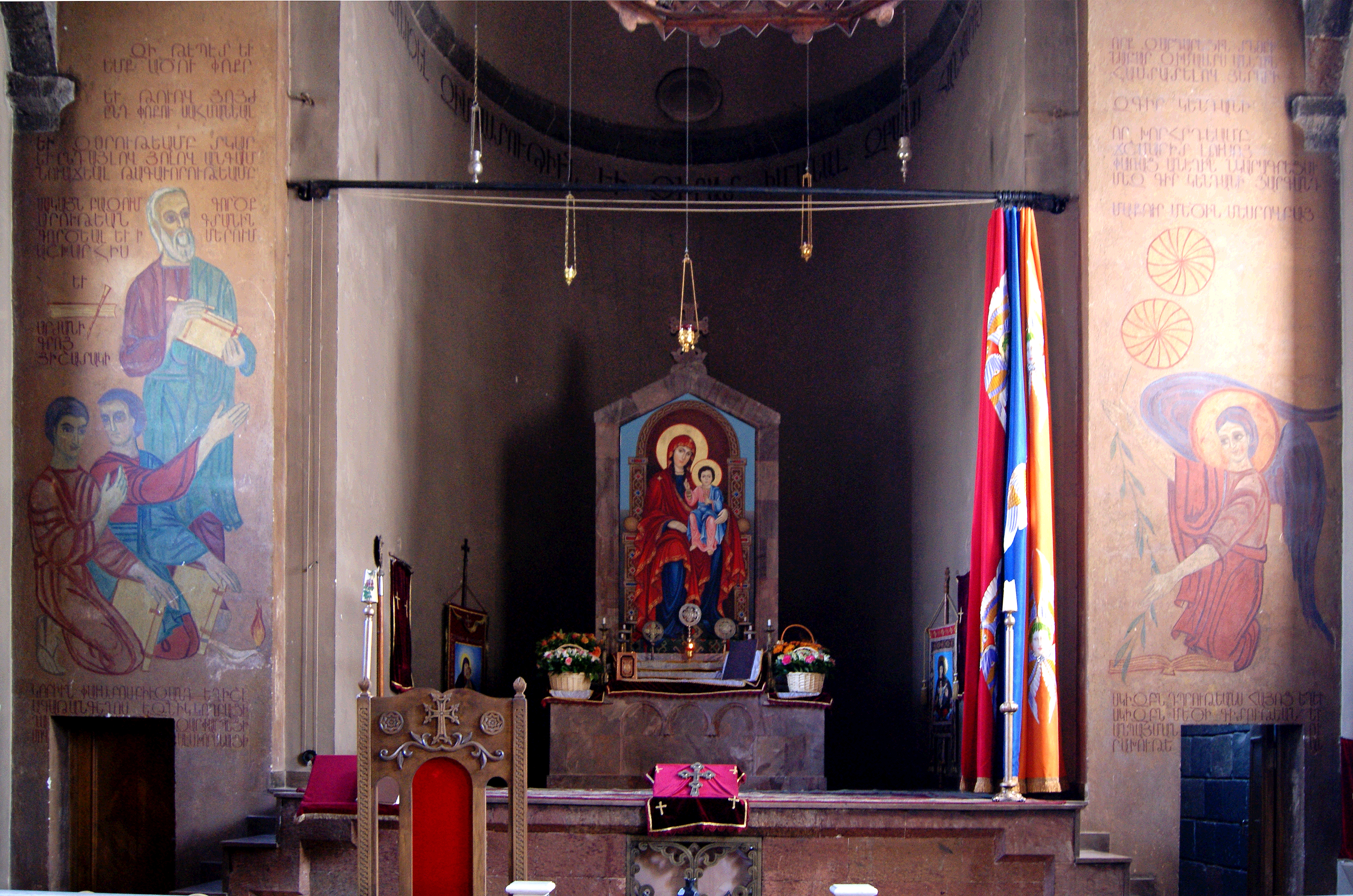
Saint Mesrop Mashtots Cathedral in Oshakan

Modern statues and sculptures

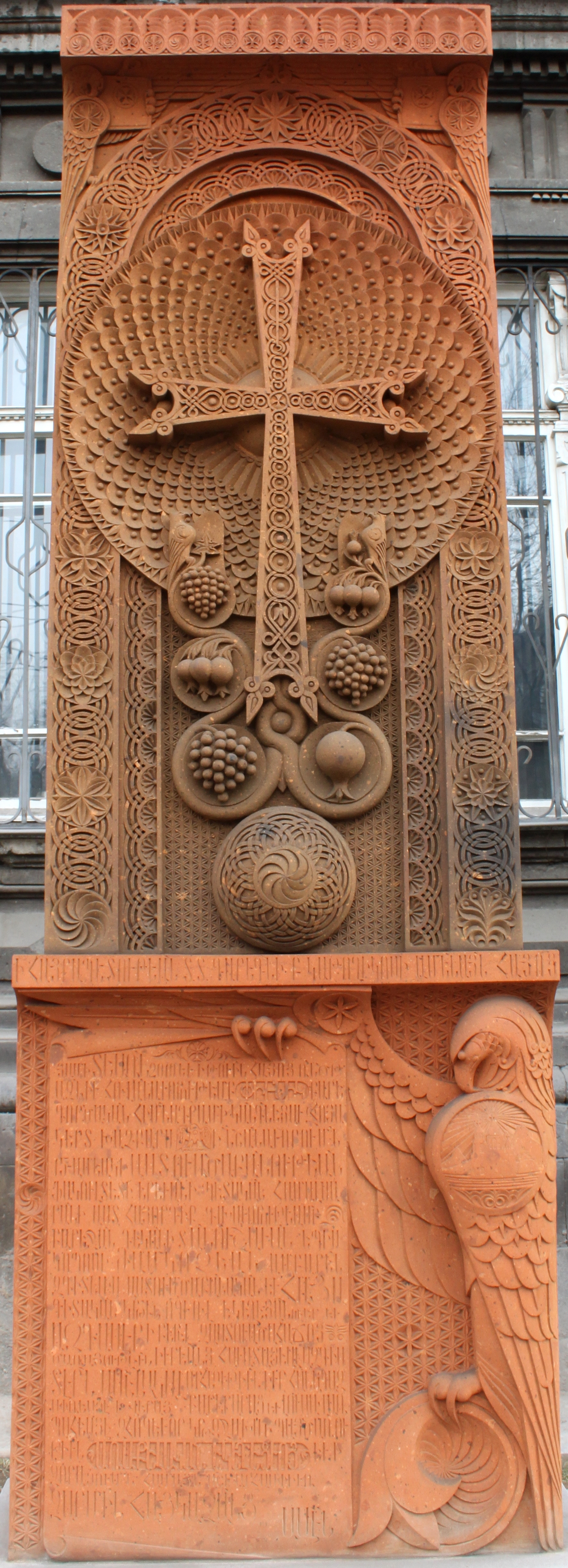
A modern khatchkar in Yerevan

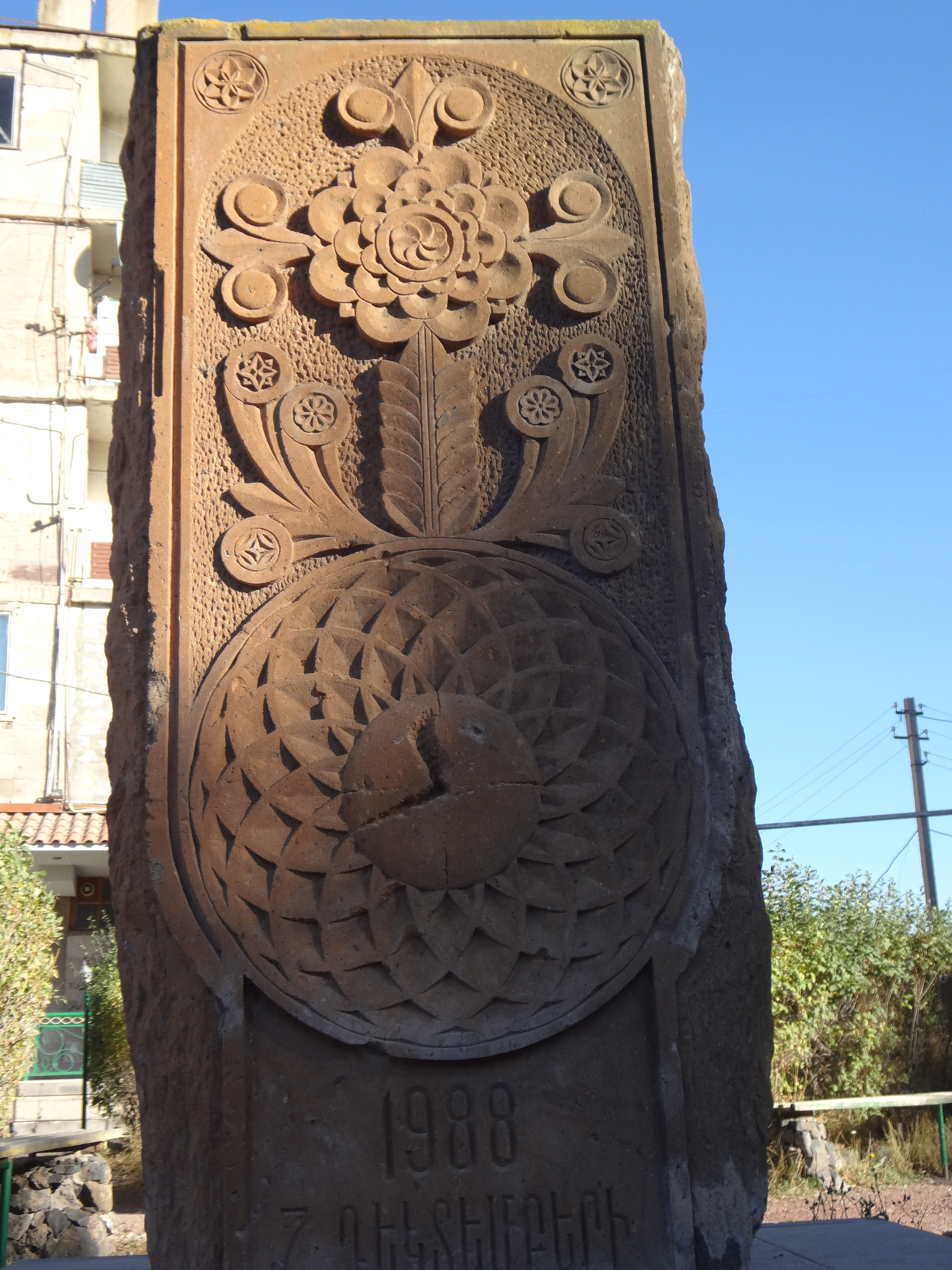
A khachkar in memory of the victims of the 1988 Armenian earthquake

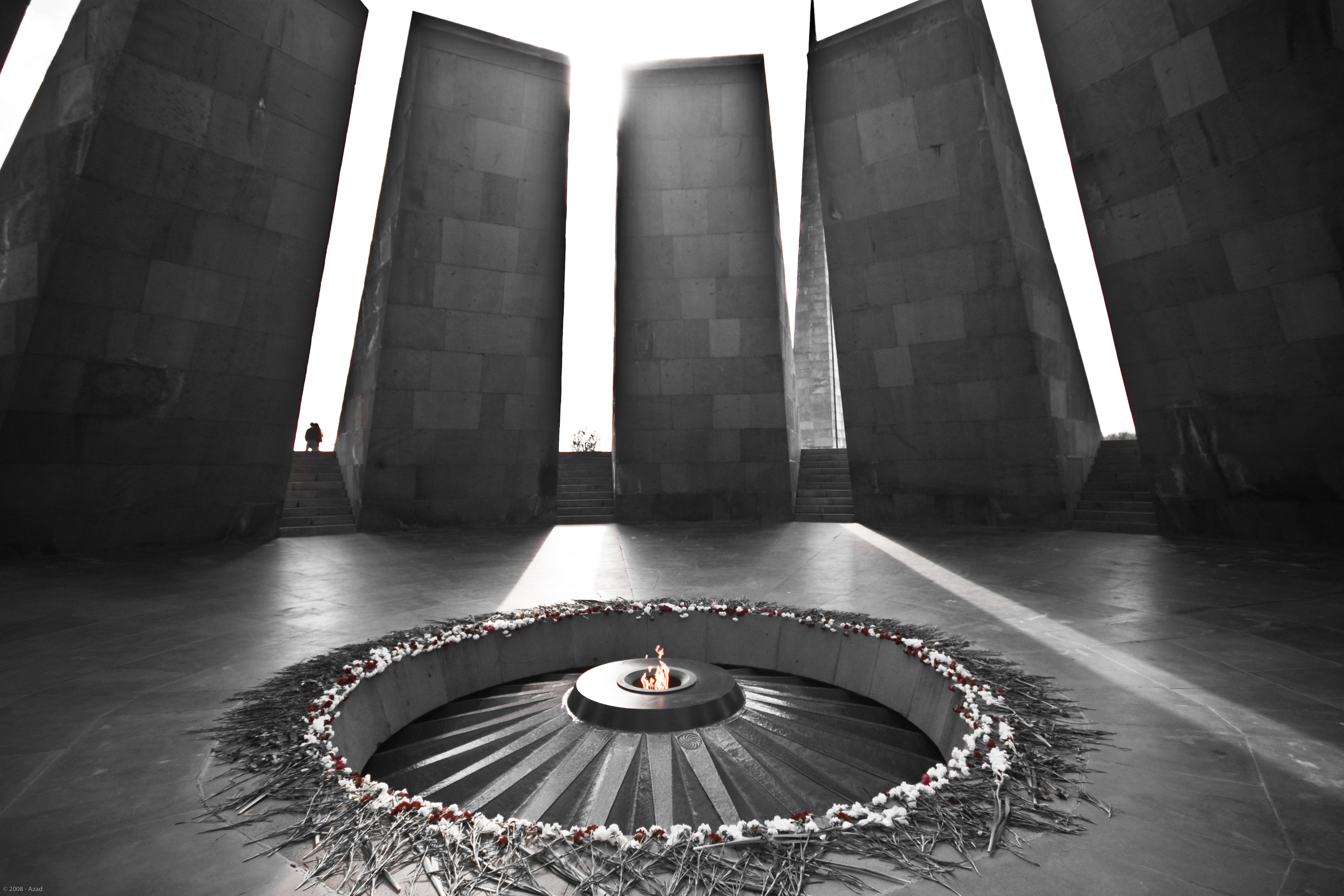
Armenian Genocide memorial in Yerevan, 1965

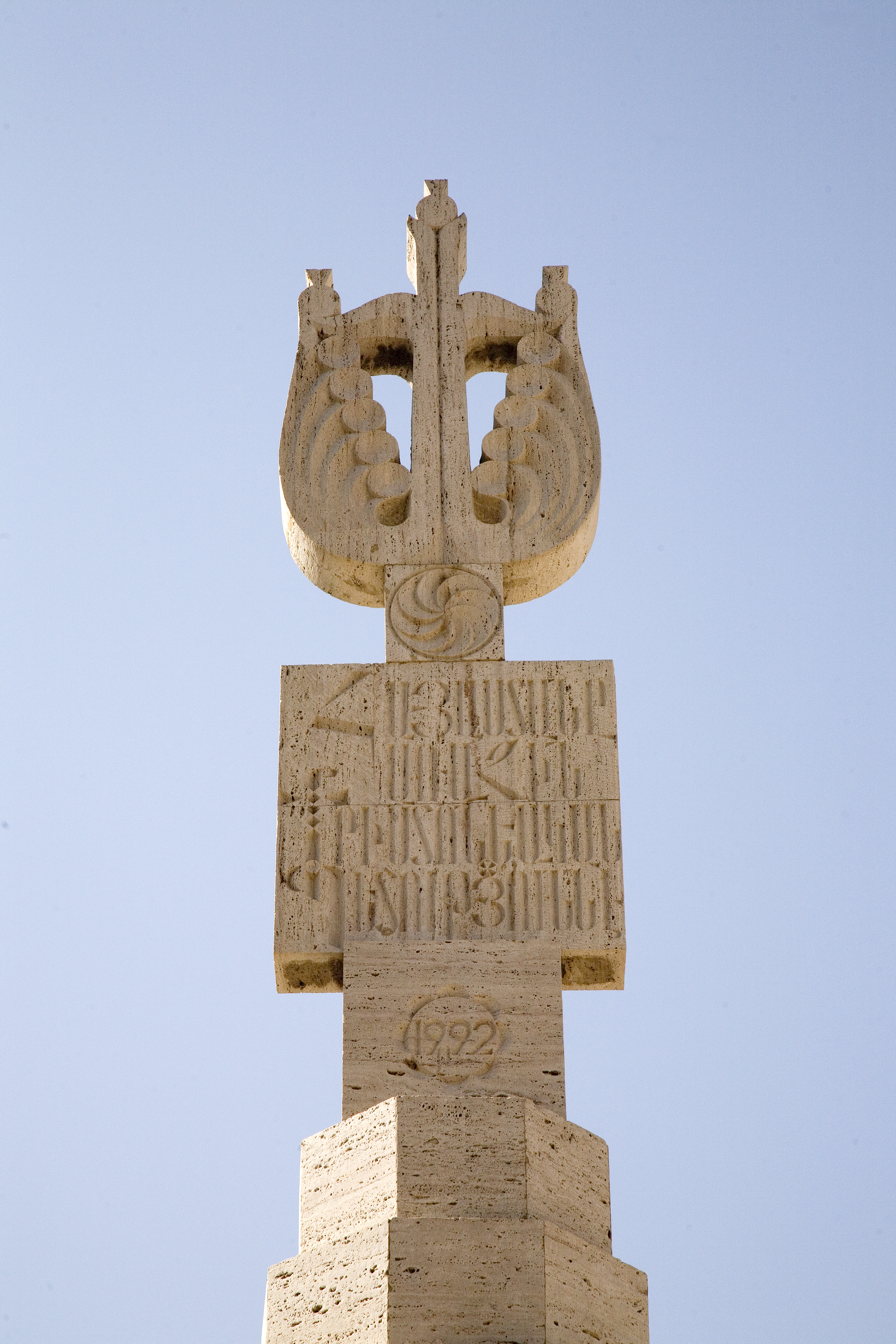
A 1992 monument in the Yerevan Cascade to Armenia becoming the first Christian state in the fourth century

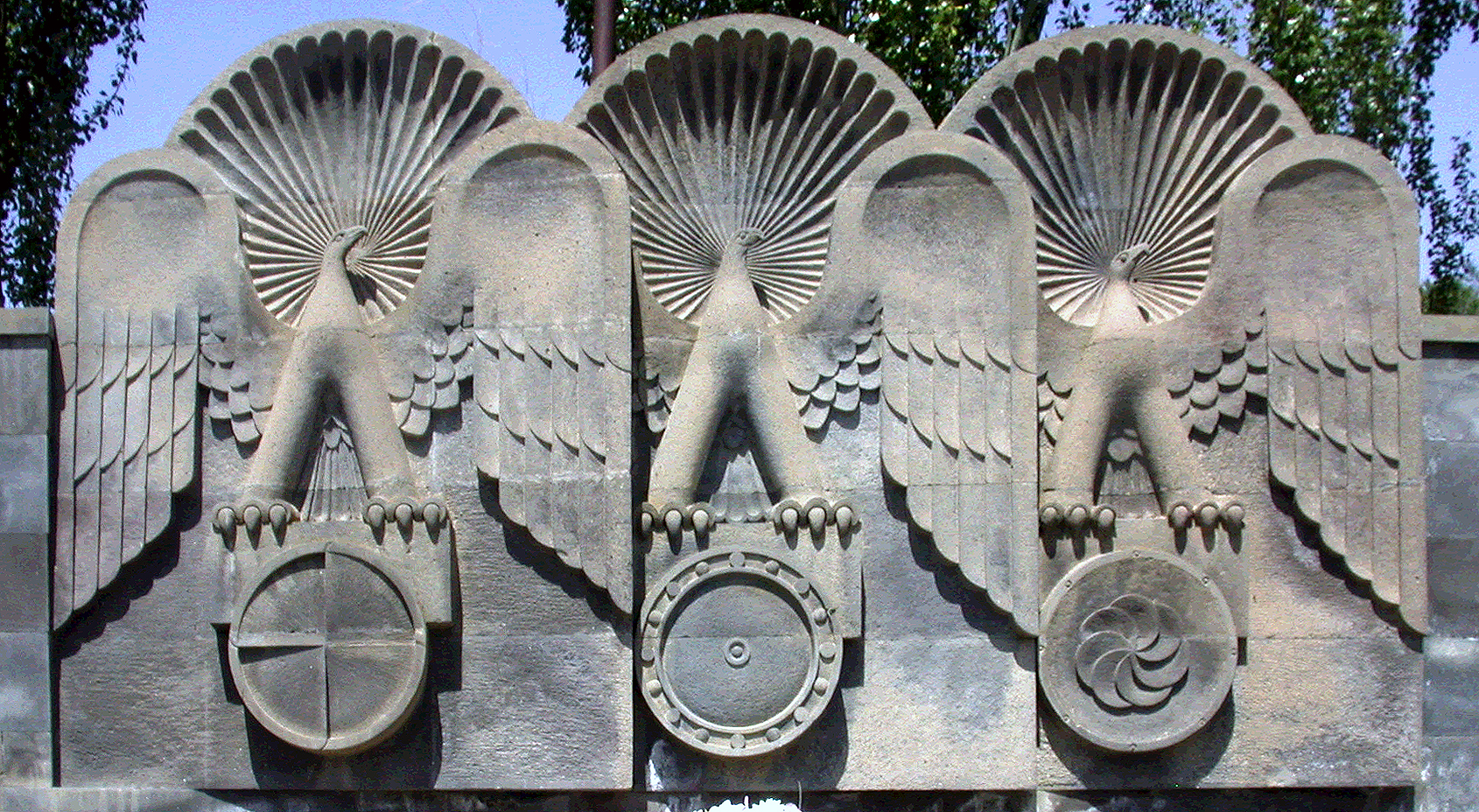
A monument dedicated to the memory of the Armenian soldiers killed in the Nagorno-Karabakh conflict, Sisian

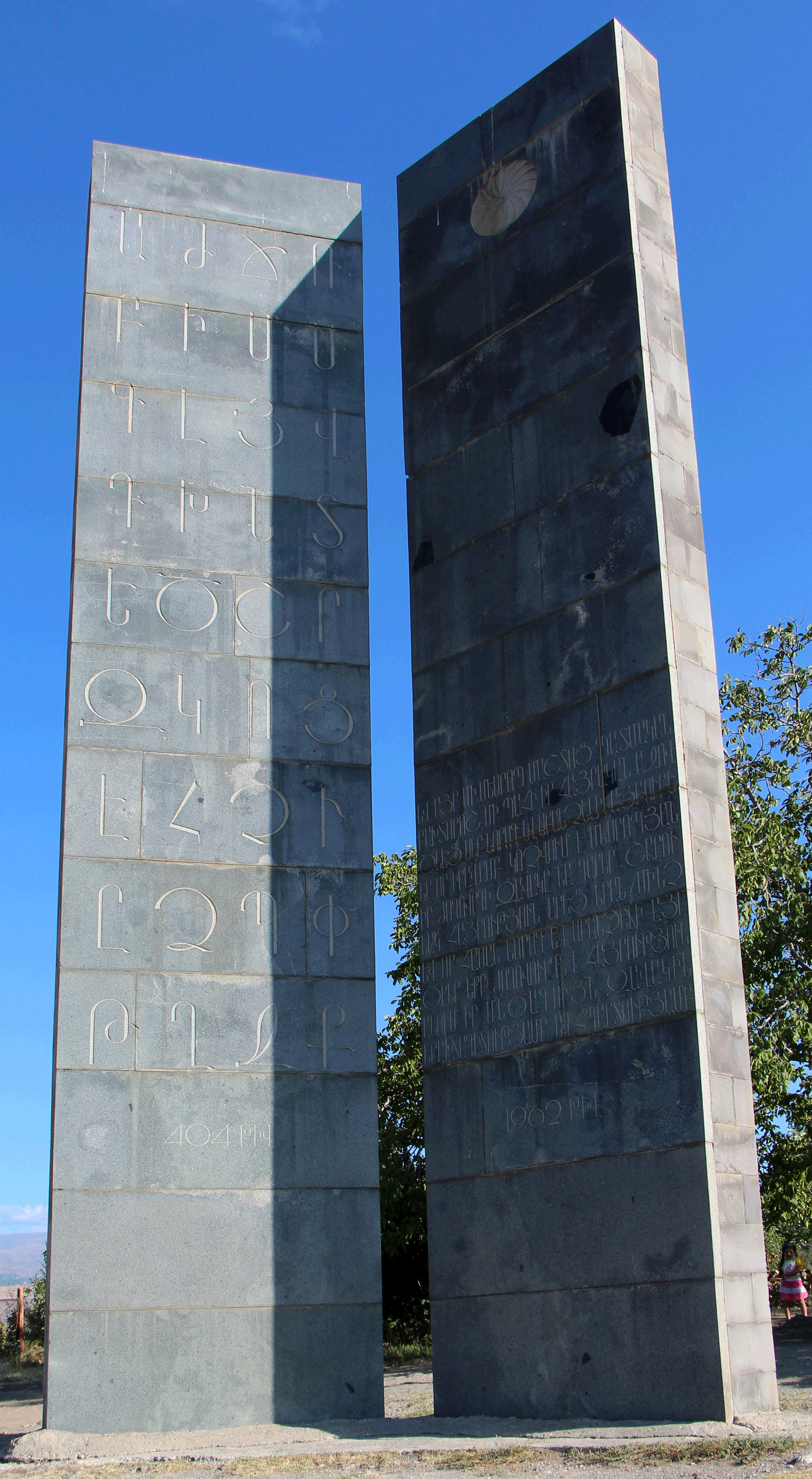
A monument of Armenian Alphabet and Eternity sign on Oshakan tower

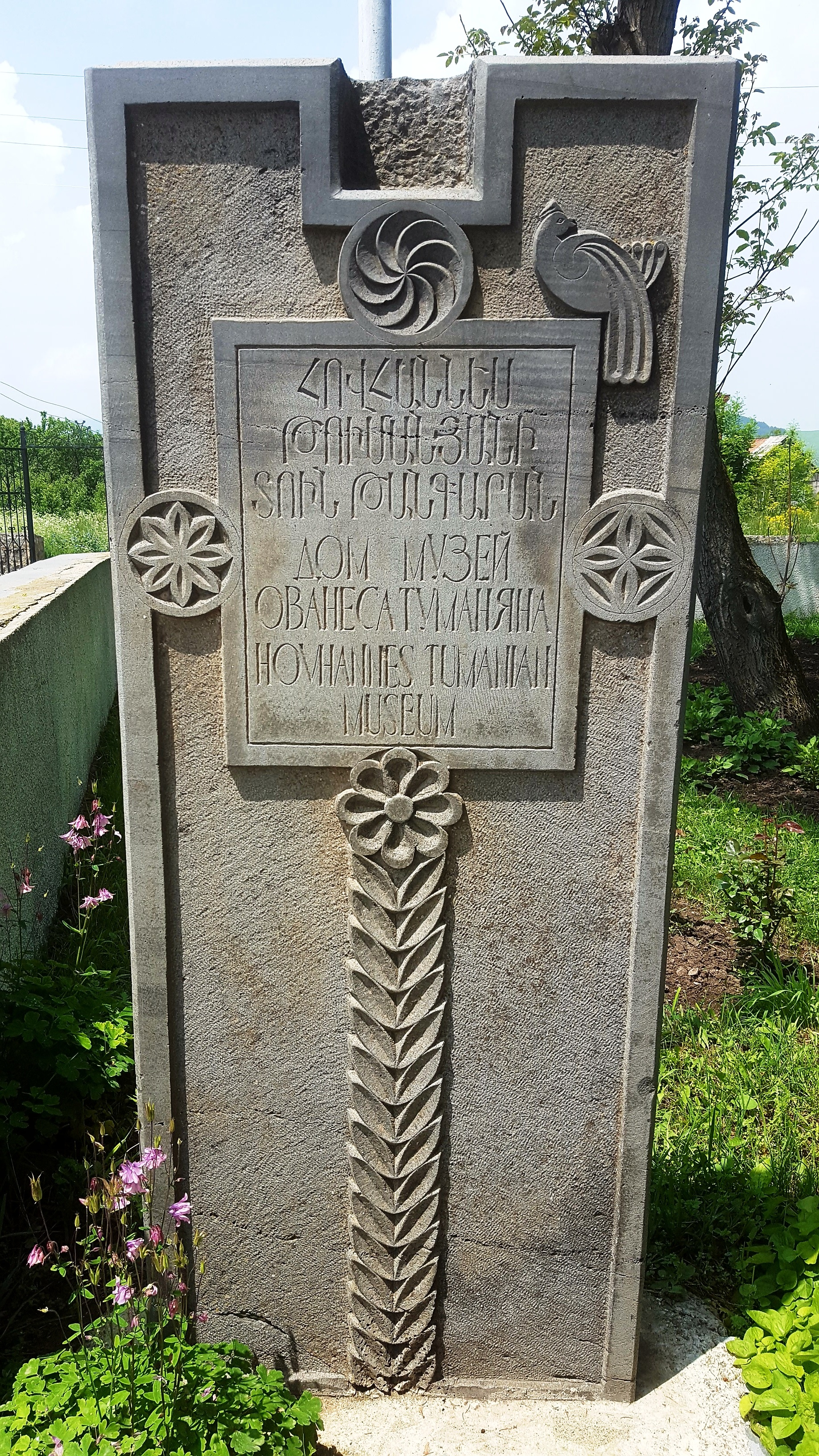
A plaque at the entrance of Hovhannes Tumanyan's museum in Dsegh

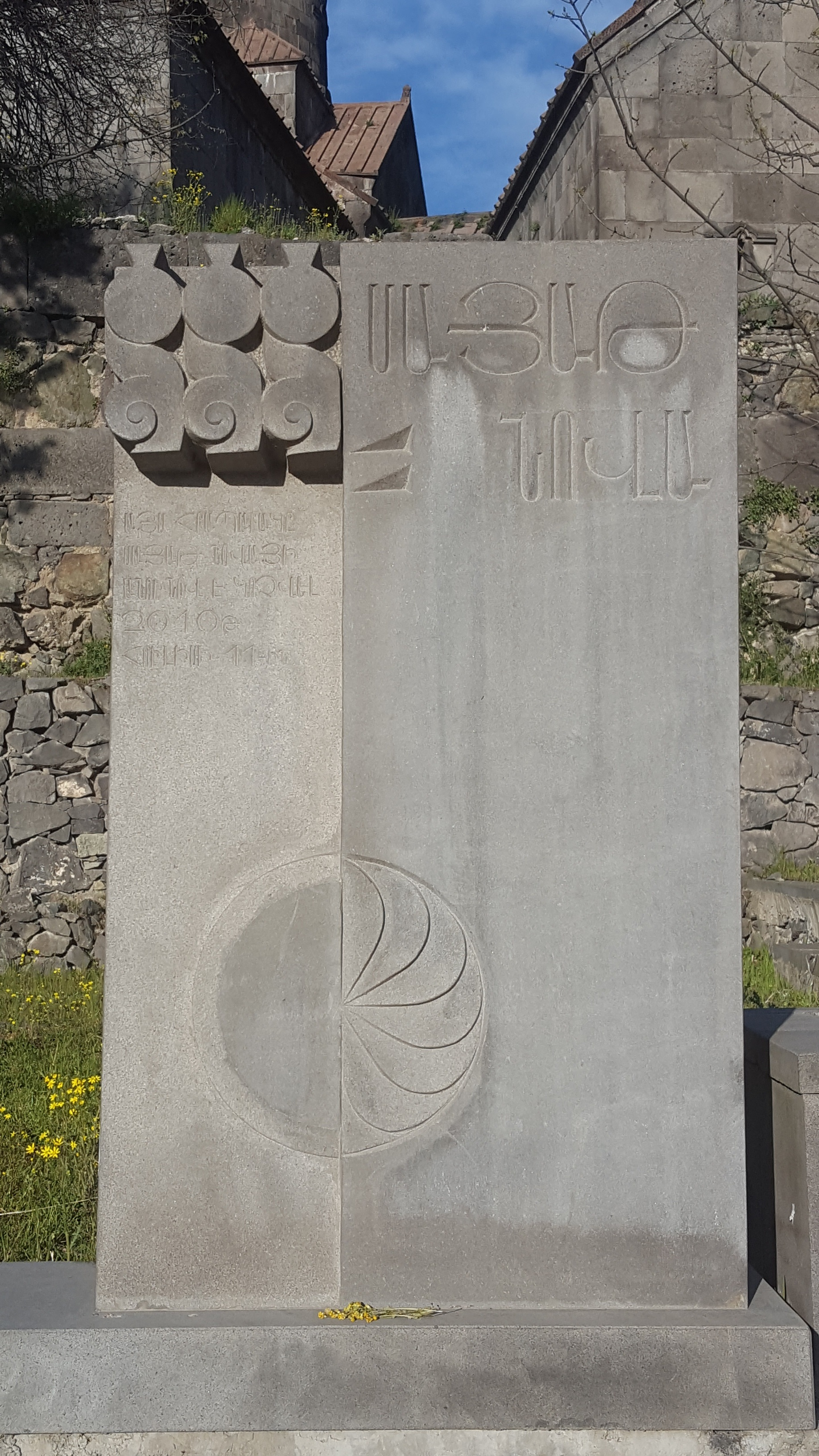
A plaque indicating that the square at the entrance of the Haghpat Monastery was named for Sayat-Nova in 2010

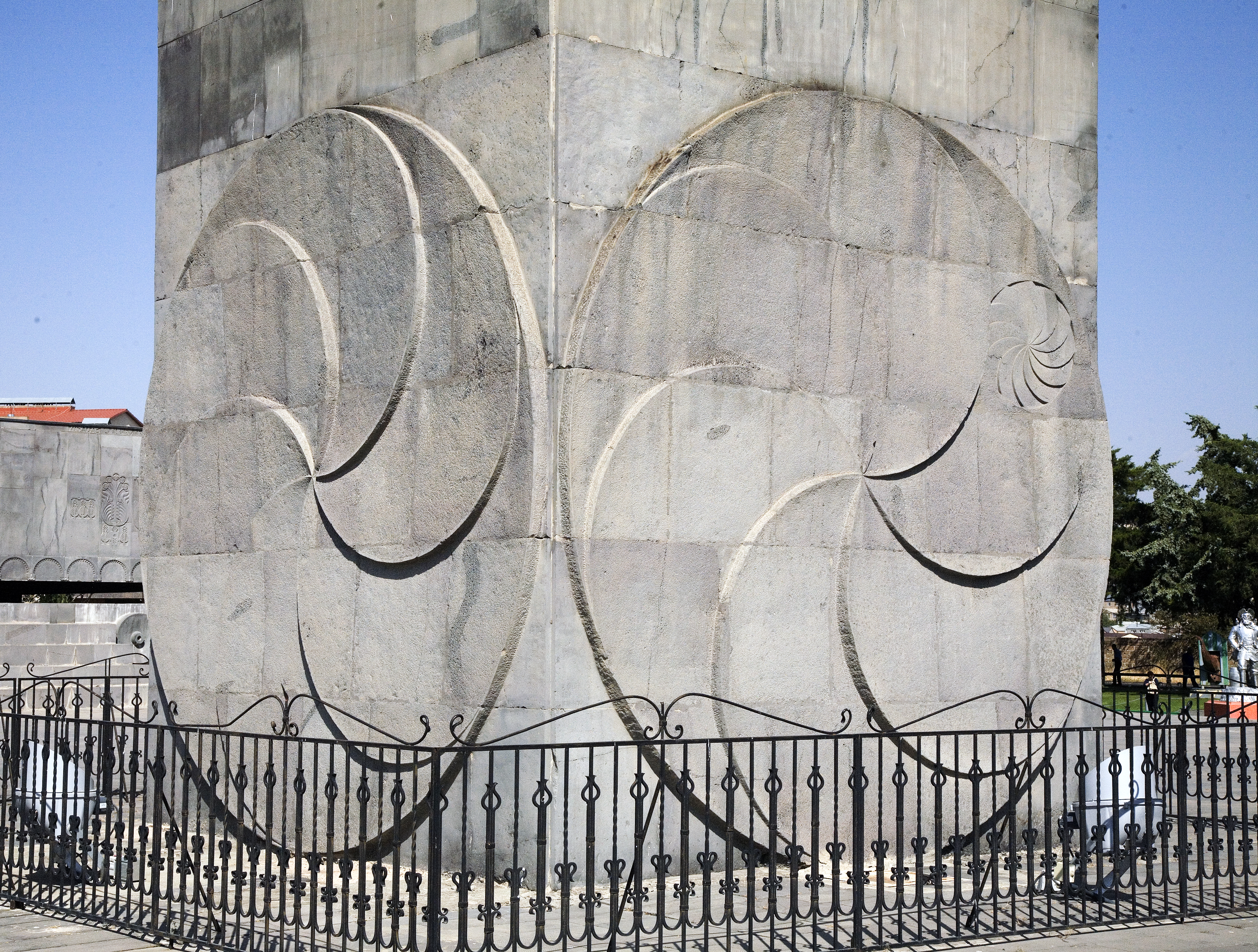
There are 9 eternity signs on the 1965 monument "Revived Armenia" at the top of Yerevan Cascade, dedicated to the 50th anniversary of Soviet rule in Armenia.

Logos

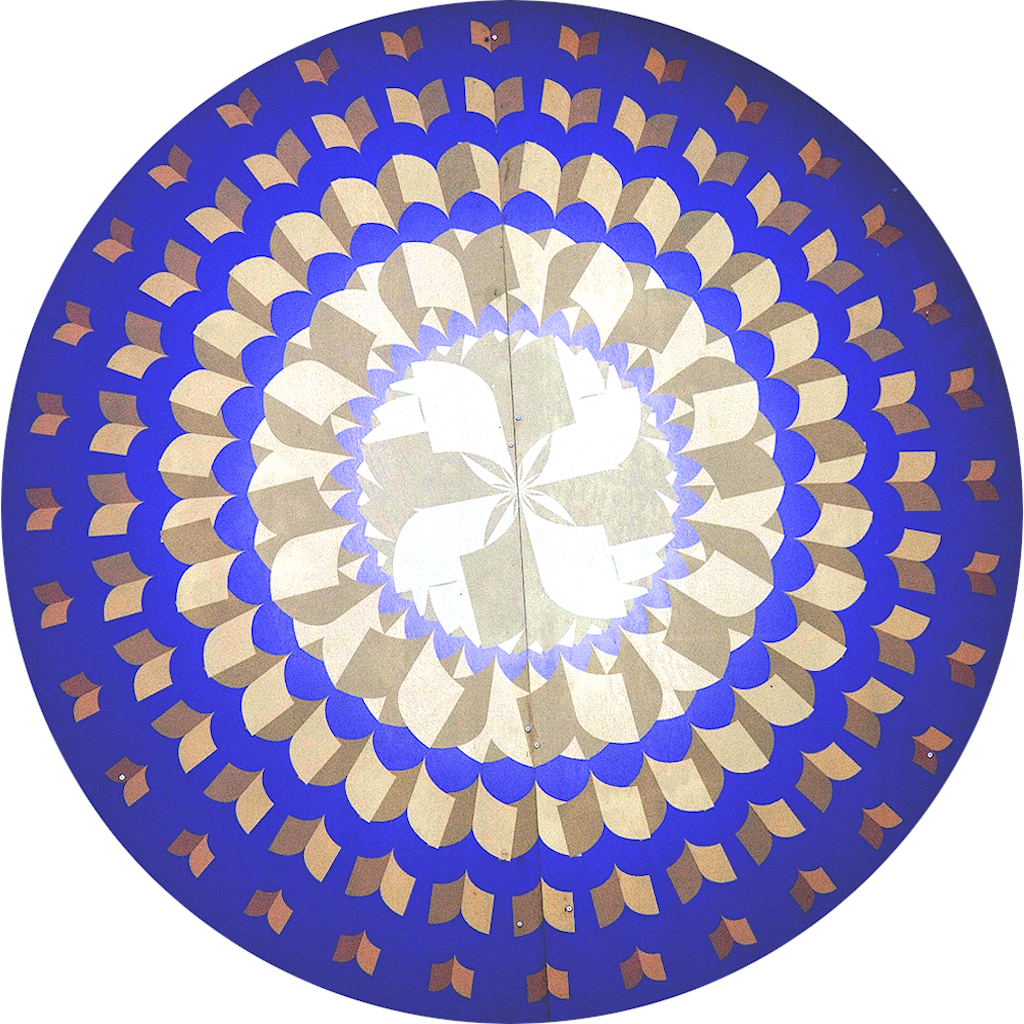
Symbol of National Library of Armenia

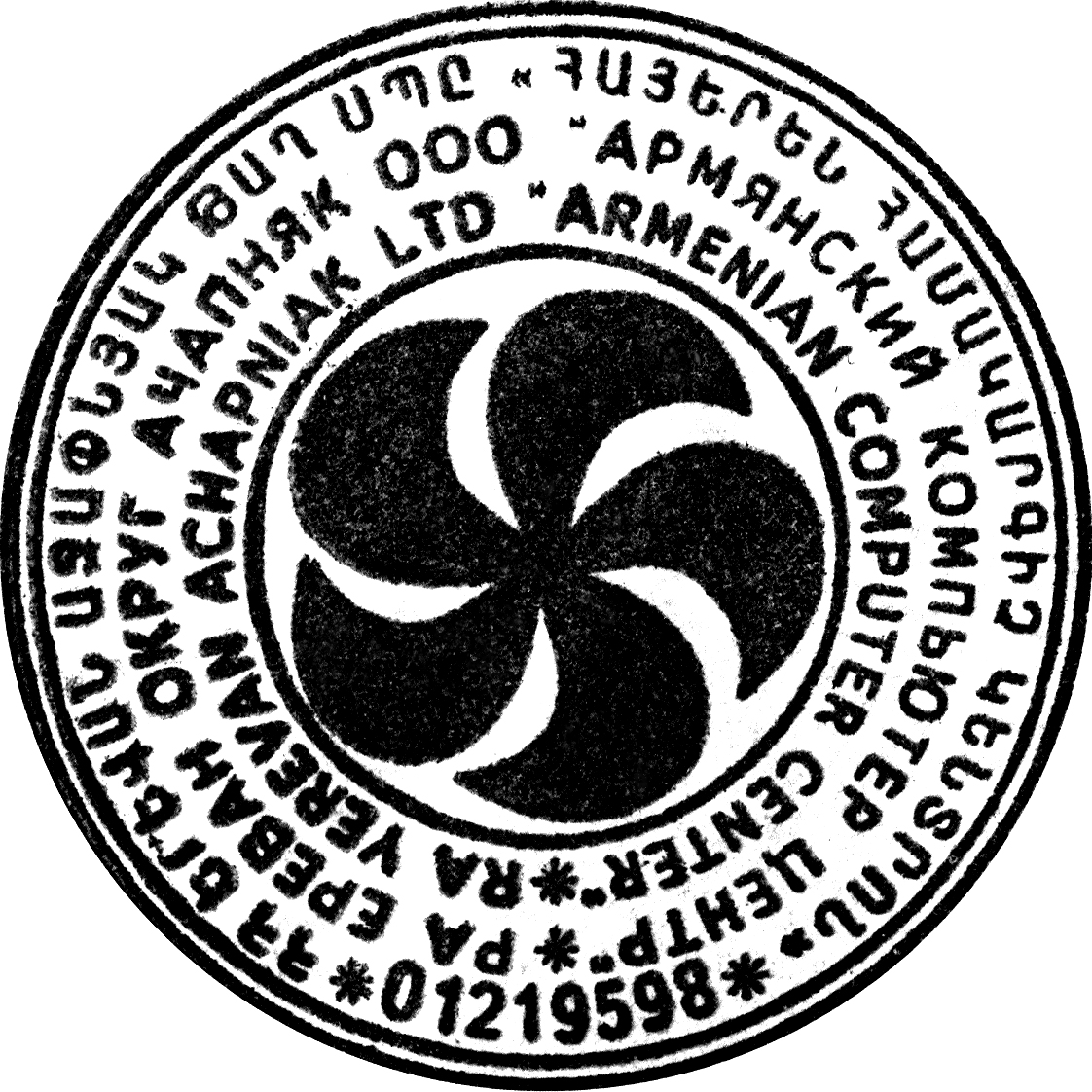
Rubber stamp of the "Armenian Computer Center" Ltd., 1998

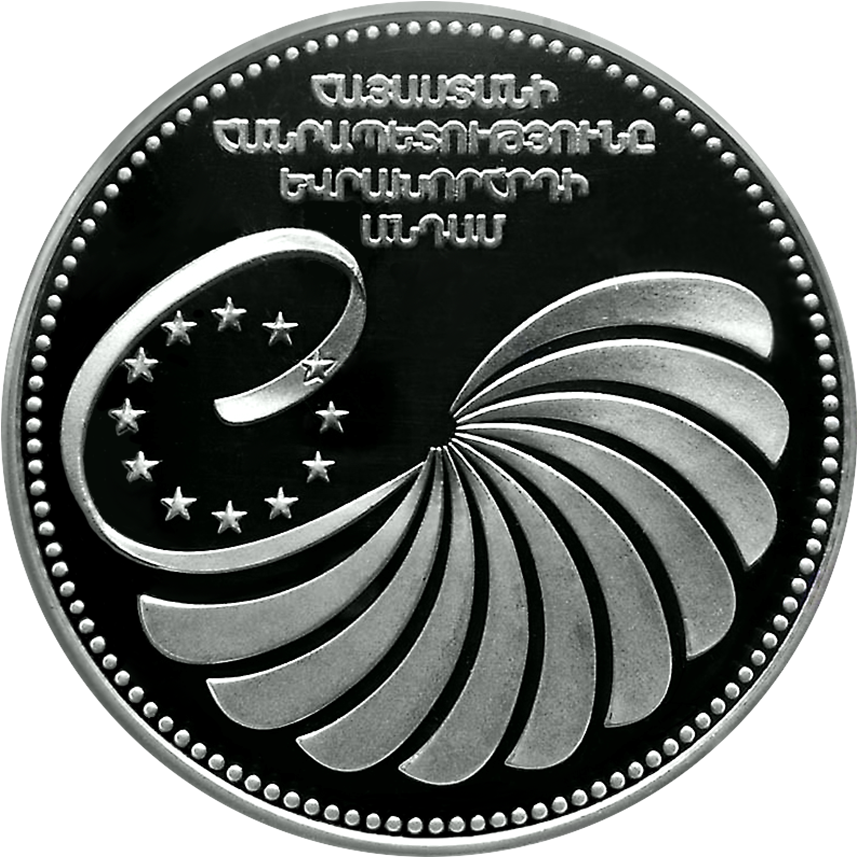
Commemorative coins of Armenia, Armenia joining the Council of Europe, January 25, 2001

Seal of Yerevan, adopted in 2004

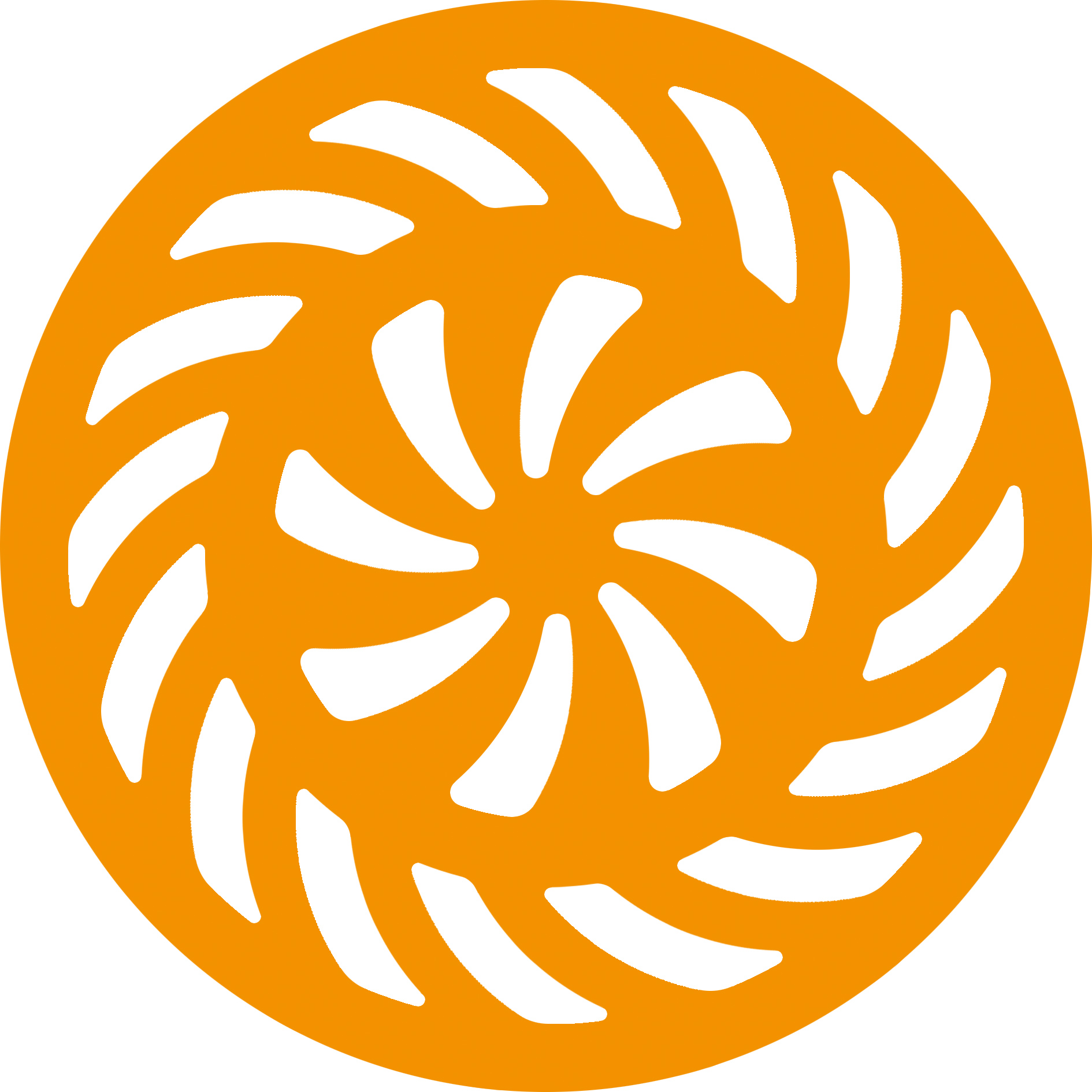
The emblem of the Peoples Art Centre in Yerevan

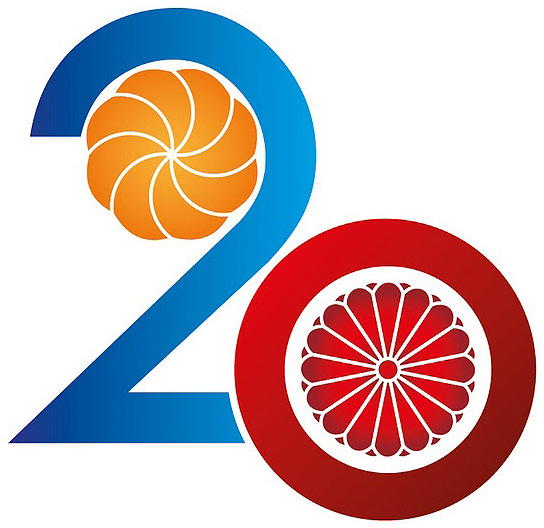
The Japanese national sign Chrysanthemum and the Armenian eternity sign in one logo made in colors of national flags, 2011

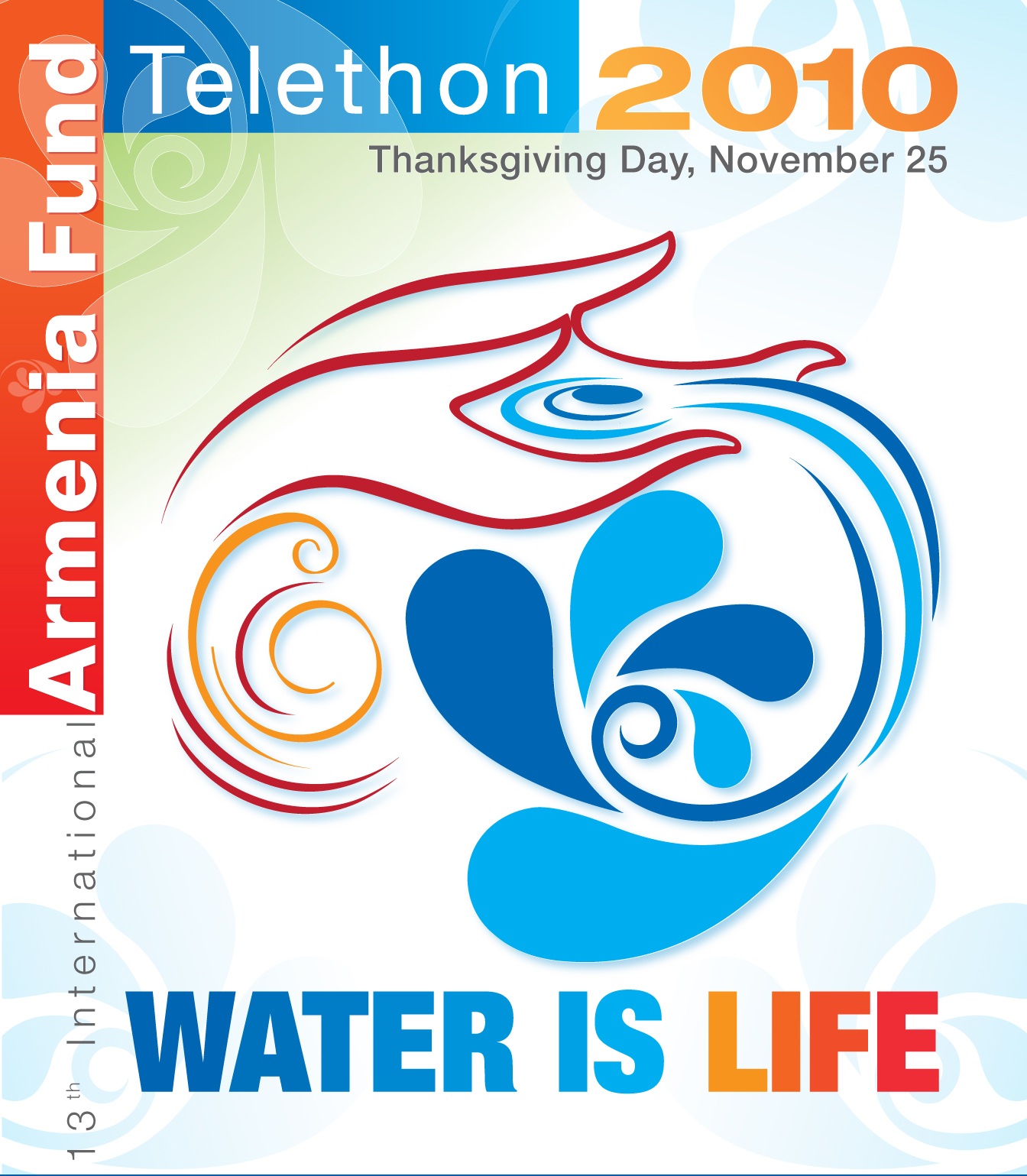
Water is life - Armenia Fund telethon logo, 2010

in other cultures

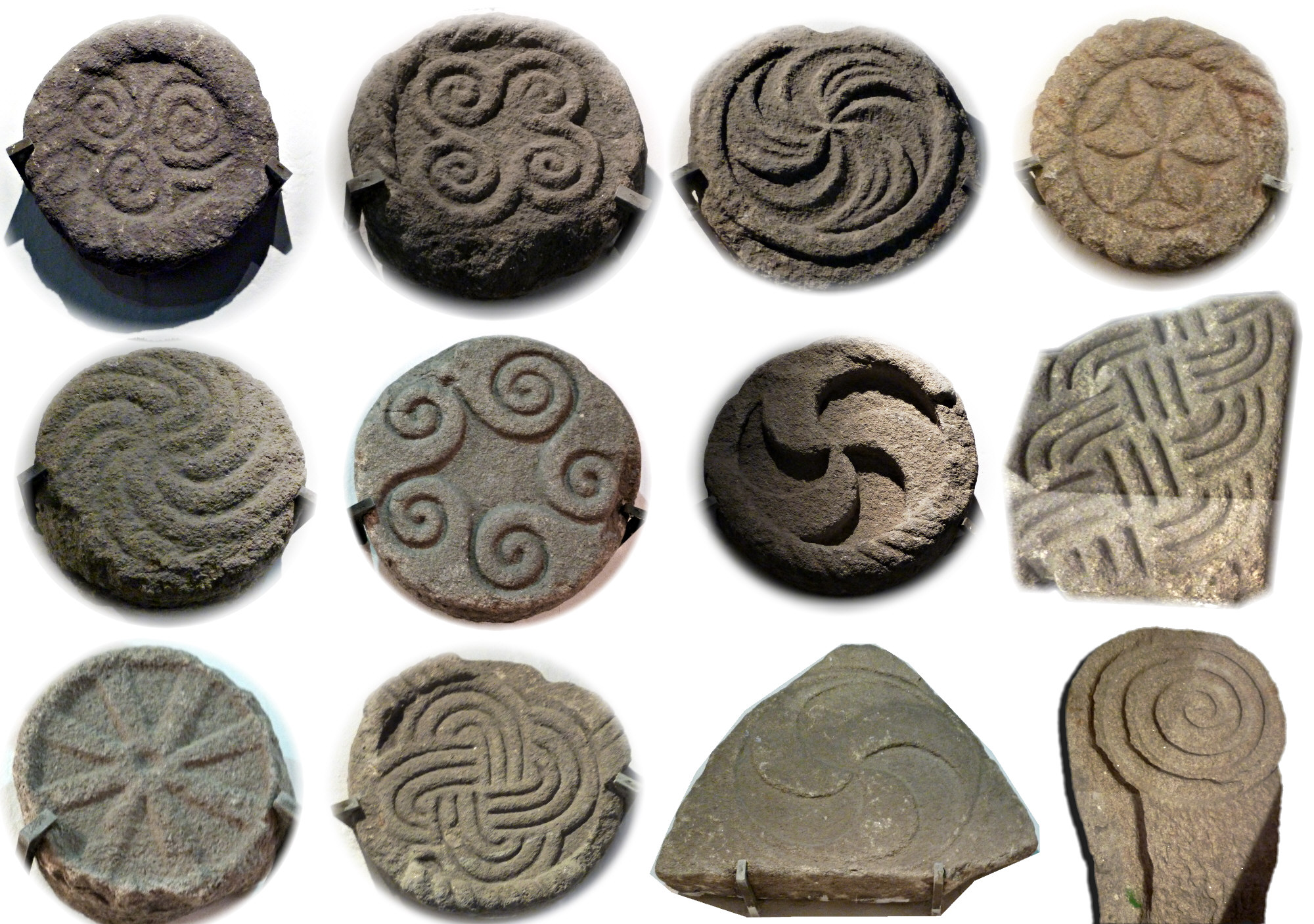
A selection of motifs and carvings, Castro culture

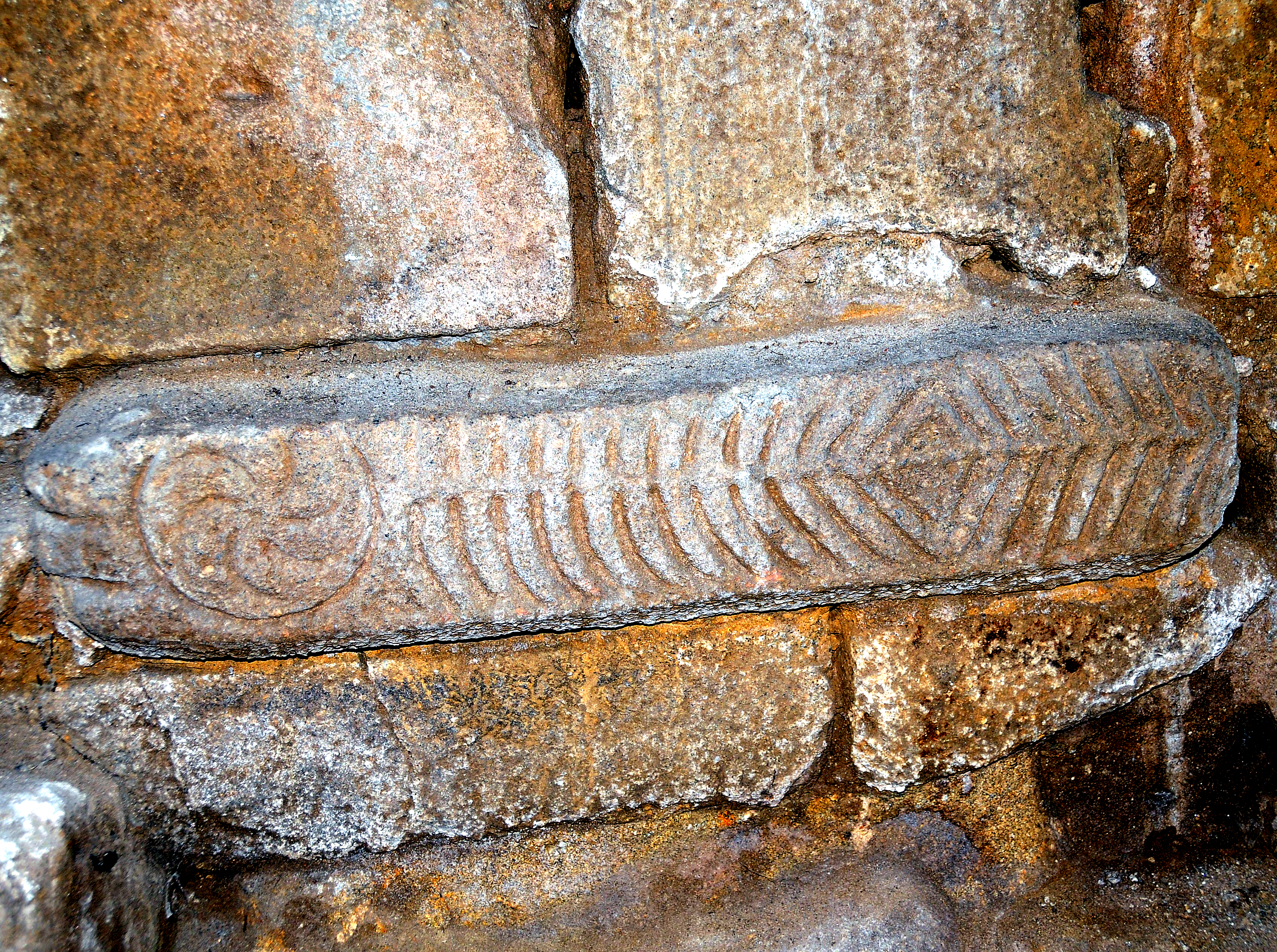
Stone from Castro culture

== See also ==
- Borjgali
- Castro culture (Economy and Arts, Stonework, Metallurgy)
- Hilarri (Basque steles)
- Lists of national symbols
- Petroglyph
- Pictish stone
- Picture stones of Gotland
- Triskelion
