= Achajur =

Achajur Աչաջուր
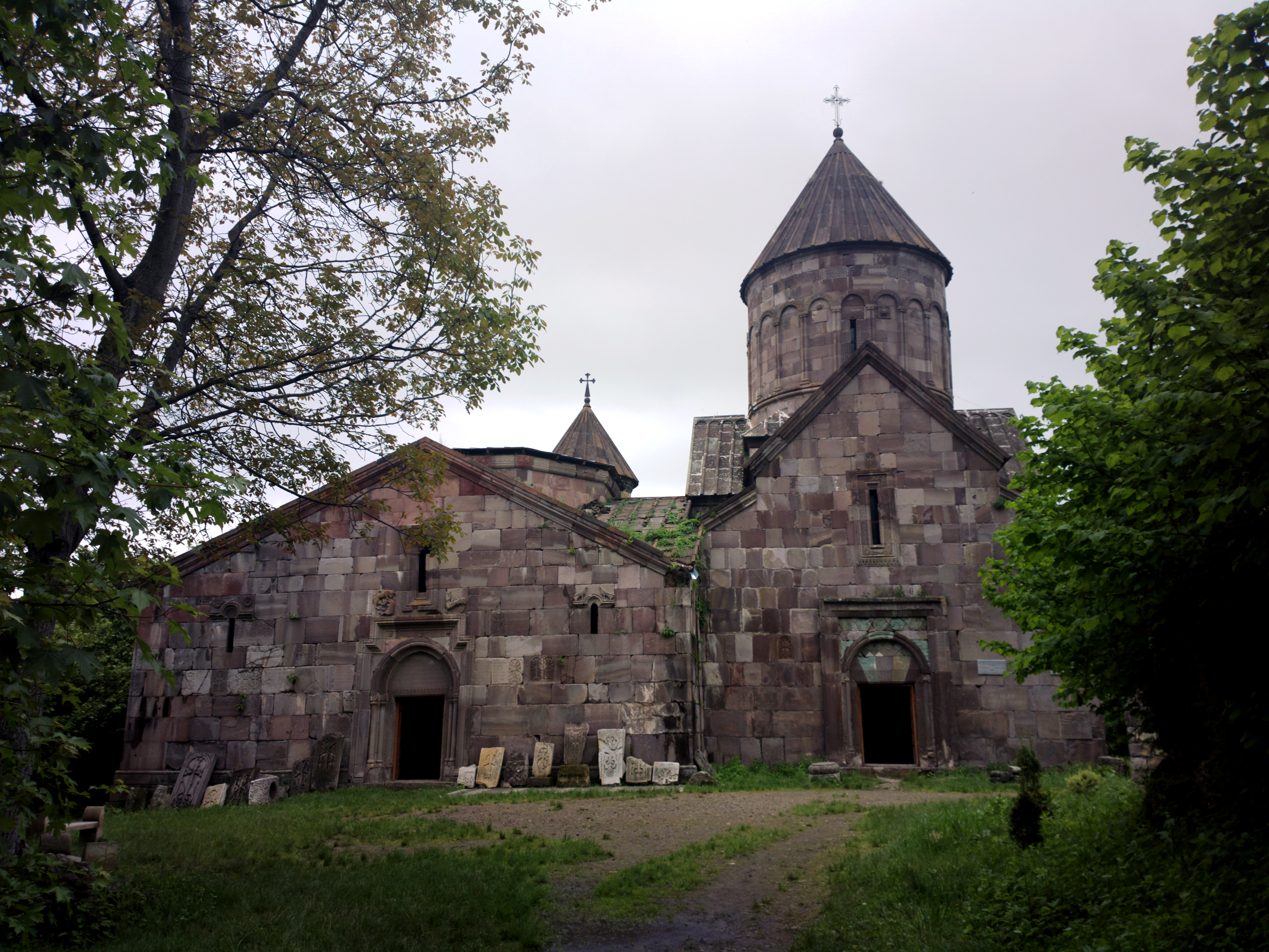
- Makaravank Monastery

- Location within Armenia Location within Tavush
- Coordinates: 40°59′25″N 45°08′43″E
- Country: Armenia
- Province: Tavush
- Municipality: Ijevan

Population (2011)
  - Total: 4,258
- Time zone: UTC+4 (AMT)

Achajur (Armenian: Աչաջուր) is a village in the Ijevan Municipality of the Tavush Province of Armenia. The 10th-13th century Makaravank Monastery is located near Achajur.

== Toponymy ==
The village was previously known as Achasu.

== Gallery ==
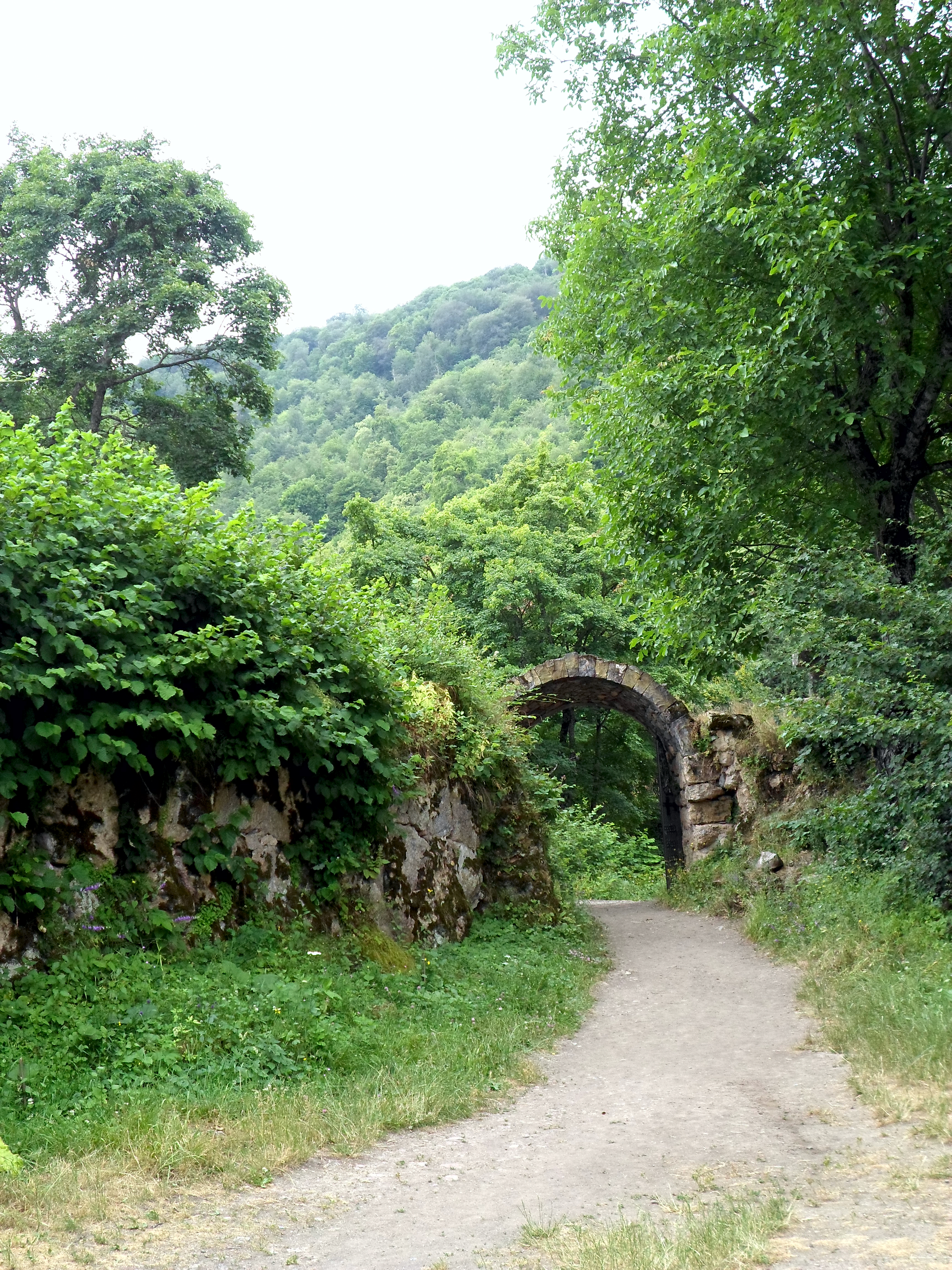
Gate to Makaravank

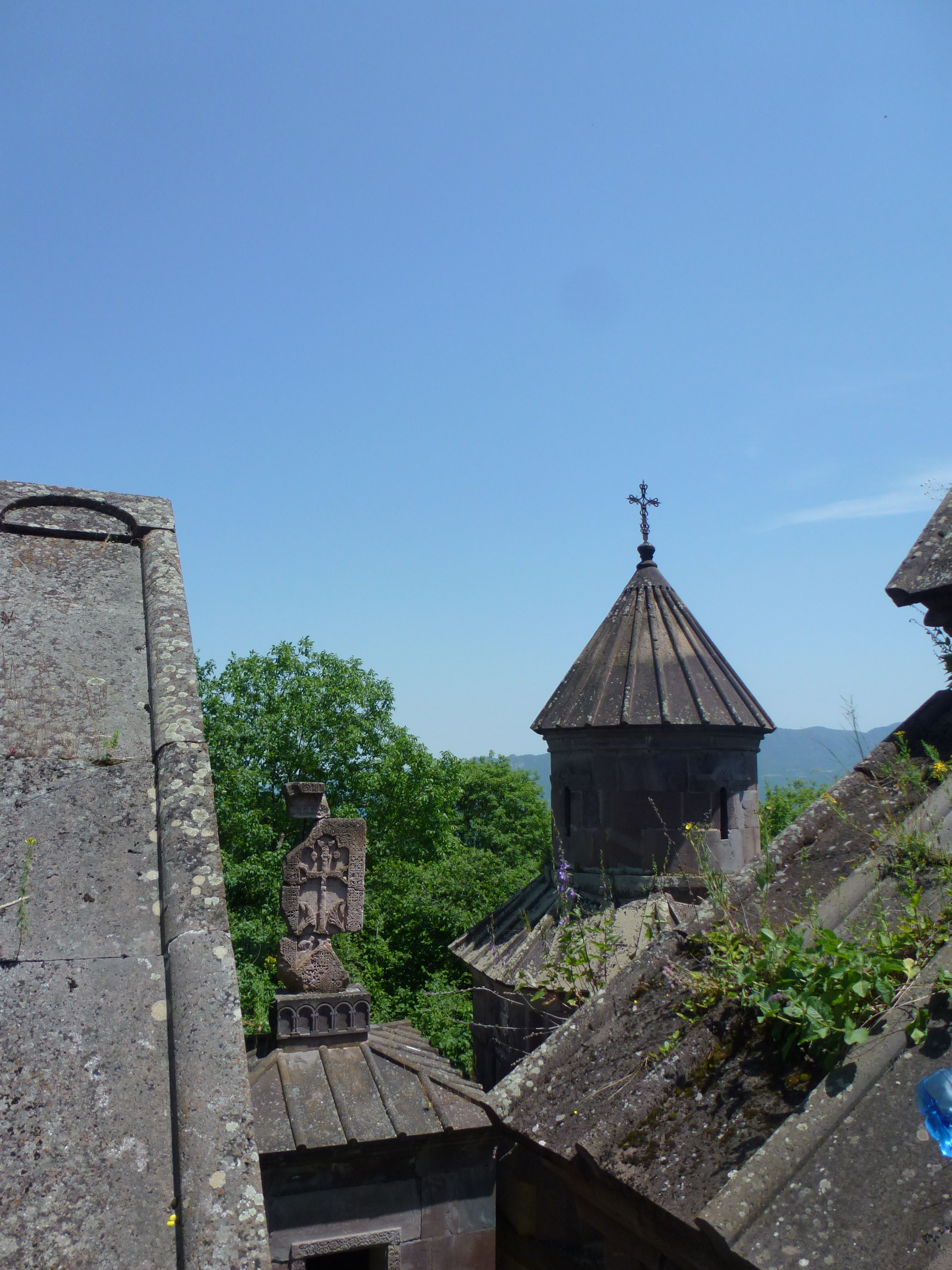
Makaravank Monastery

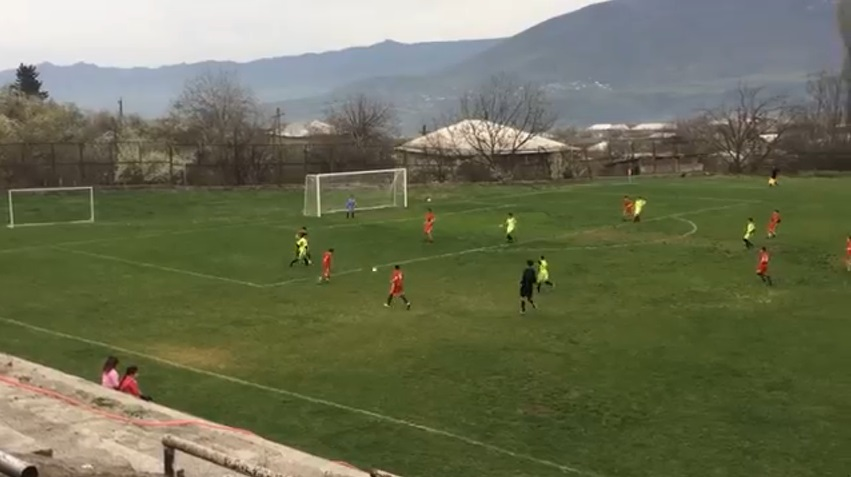
Vachik Kaltakhchyan Stadium in Achajur
