= Makaravank =

10th-13th century church complex near the Achajur village of Tavush Province, Armenia

Makaravank Մակարավանք
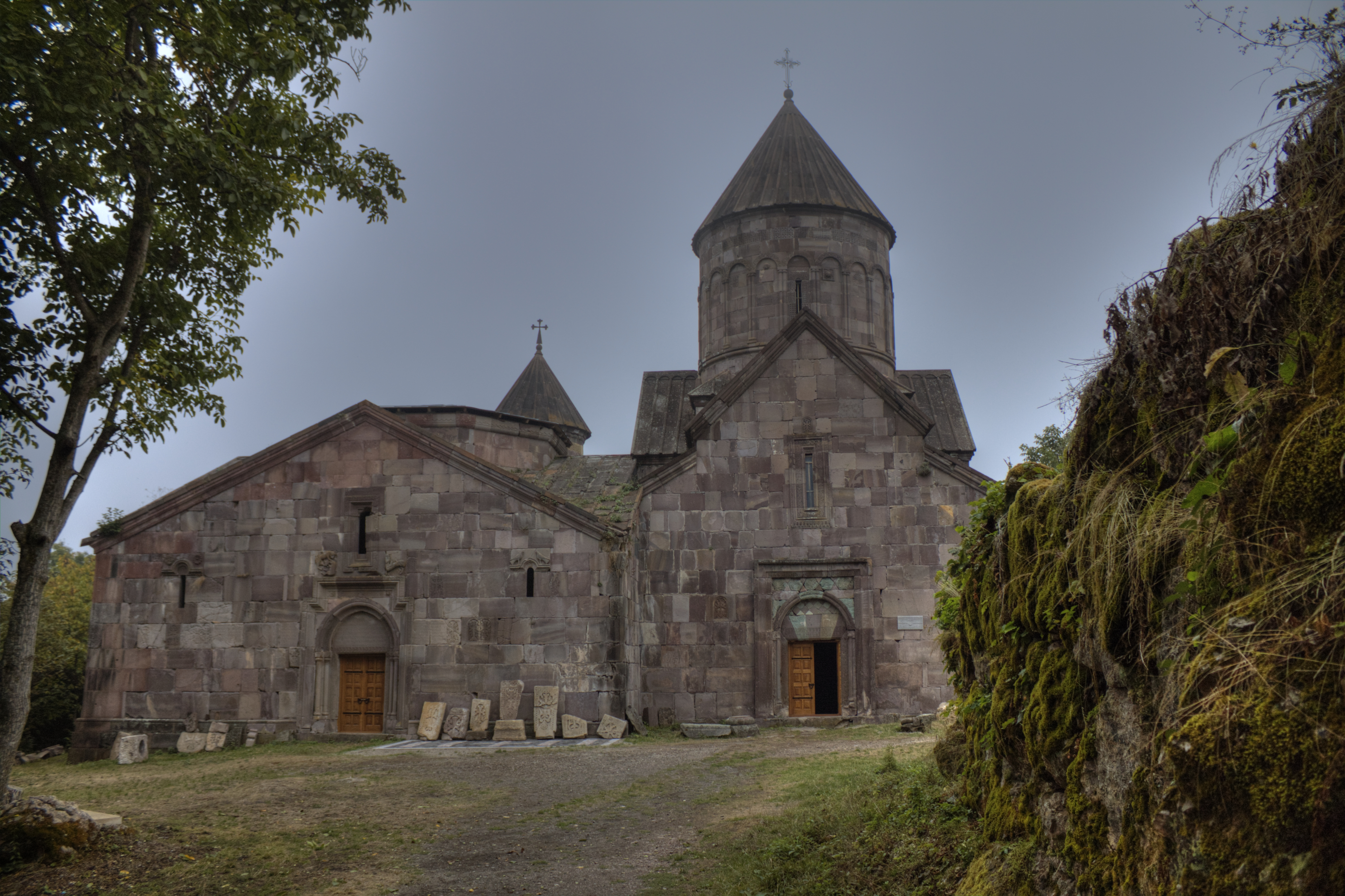

- Location within Armenia Location within Tavush

Religion
- Affiliation: Armenian Apostolic Church

Location
- Location: Tavush Province, Armenia
- Coordinates: 40.973819°N 45.127233°E

Architecture
- Style: Armenian
- Groundbreaking: 10th century
- Completed: 13th century

Makaravank (Armenian: Մակարավանք) is a 10th-13th century church complex near the Achajur village of Tavush Province, Armenia, located on the slope of Paitatap Mountain. The complex of Makaravank ranks among Aghtamar, Bgheno-Noravank, Gandzasar with its originality, richness and variety of ornaments and occupies an important place in Armenian architecture.

Though the monastery is no longer used for services, the complex is well preserved. There are 4 churches, a gavit (narthex) that serves the two largest of the churches, and other buildings which served secondary roles. At one time, there used to be vast settlements around Makaravank, the presence of which was of great importance for the growth of the monastery.

The monastery was also sometimes called Agravavank.

== History ==
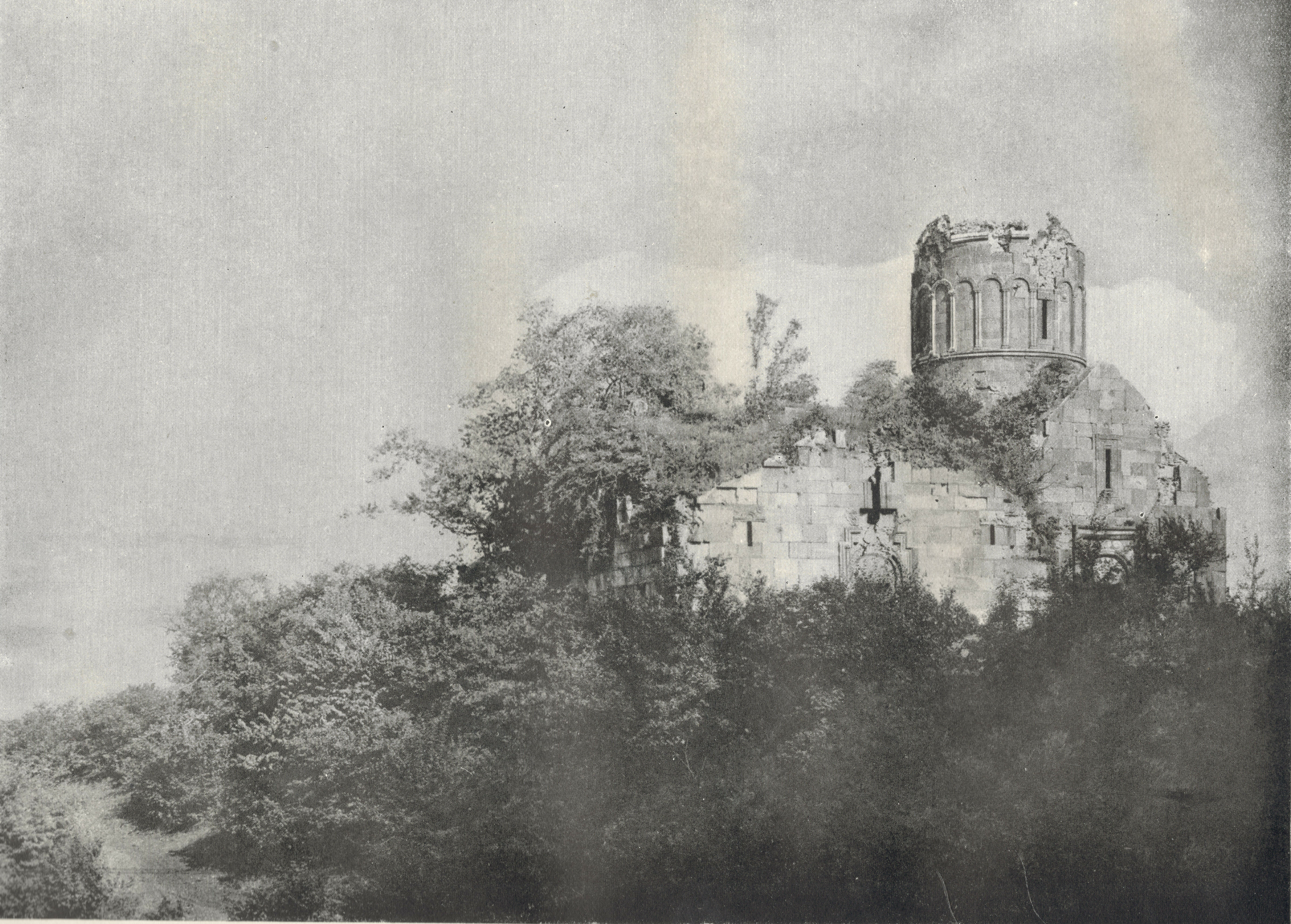
The end of the 19th century

The oldest church of the group was built during the 10th and 11th centuries. The materials used in its construction were mostly large pieces of roughly hewn red tuff (a common Armenian building material). One of the churches, named Surb Astvatsatsin church, was built in 1198 in white stone, on the eastern side of the complex. Surb Astvatsatsin is attributed to Hovhannes. The main church was built in 1205, using pink andesite, with a red andesite gavit.

== Complex ==
The monastery was surrounded with walls, its gate was decorated with columns. Numerous residential structures were situated in the enclosed territory. Among them were architectural pavilions housing mineral springs. Makaravank's structures are built of dark-pink andesite and red tufa, with occasional greenish stones. There are also remnants of a fence, and a spring/well of the 12th or 13th century outside of the walls where a picnic area is now located.

=== Main temple ===
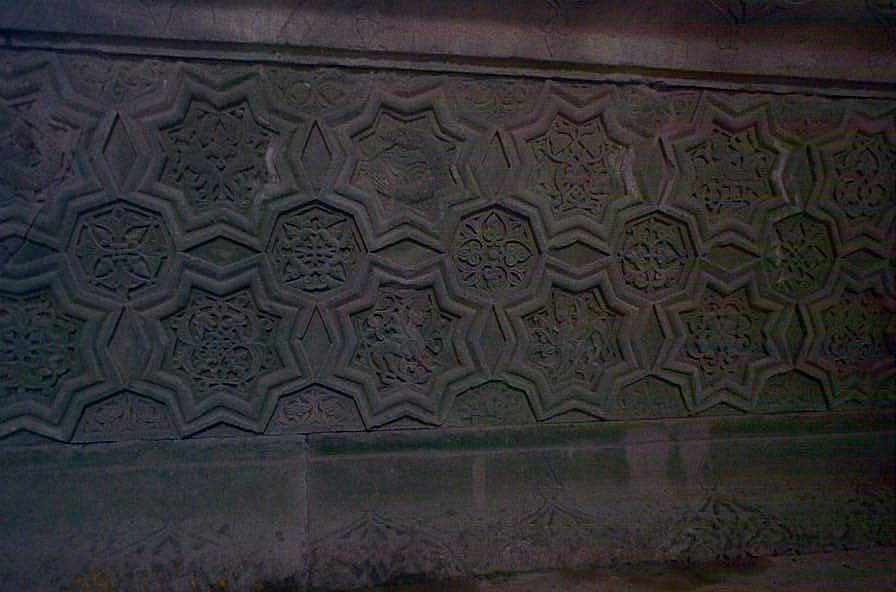
Detail below altar

Passing through the gate in the circuit wall, the main church of 1205, built by Vardan, son of Prince Bazaz, is on the right.

The main temple is a domed hall. The diameter of the high dome is quite large, and the under-dome space predominates in the structure's interior. The vertical orientation of the interior is emphasized by the pillars supporting the dome. Attached to the pillars are several faceted pilasters and half-columns which form, at the top, semi-circular and pointed arches bearing the supporting girth of the domes. High niches, semi-circular in the plan, framed with graceful arcatures on twin half-columns, which decorate the bottom of the altar apses, harmoniously fit in with the pillars.

The walls of altar daises, decorated with geometrical ornaments, are of extraordinary interest. In Makaravank the profiled eight-pointed stars and octagons between them, arranged in two rows, are covered with varied and rich carving unique in the architecture of medieval Armenia. It features various floral motifs, making up unusual bouquets, all kinds of fishes and birds, as well as sphinxes and sirens. Of interest are a boatman looking ahead, and a man's figure, placed inside an octagon up the left edge of the altar dais wall and inscribed "eritasard" – probably a self-portrait of the carver. All this is enclosed in a strongly profiled frame which draws the onlooker's attention to the reliefs inside it.

The exterior decoration of Makaravank's main temple is more expressive. Over the central window of the southern façade there is a sun dial and below it, on the cantilever column, a representation of a dove; the round windows vary in their shapes and ornamentation. The entrance portals are rectangular, with a semi-circular inner niche. The tympanum and the spandrel are composed of stones of various shapes and colors. The dome drum is skirted by a graceful twenty-arch arcature on twin half-columns.

The arches are made as an ornamental band; the same band passes between the arches and the cornice. The arcature is harmoniously proportionate to the dome and to the overall volume of the church.

=== Gavit ===
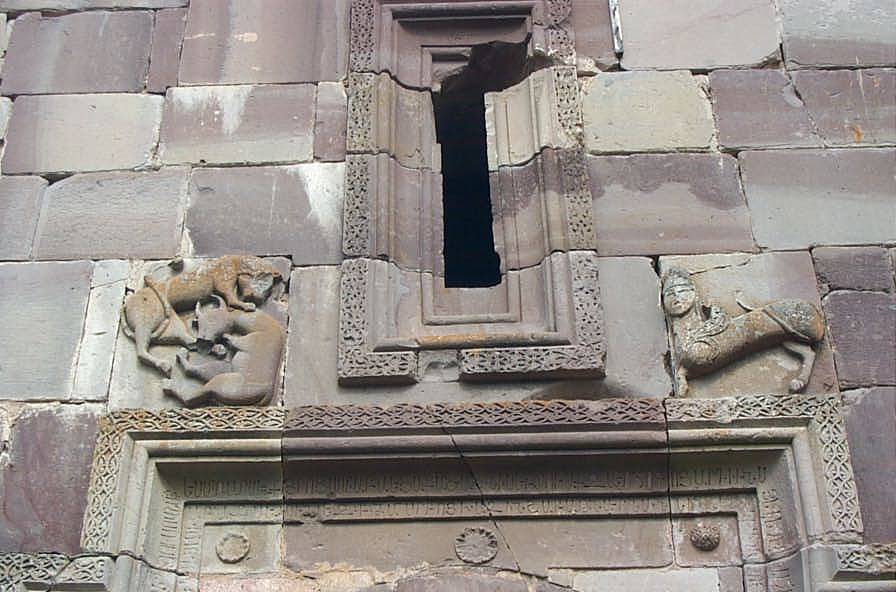
Detail above gavit portal

Passing through the gate in the circuit wall, the gavit is on the left. The facade of the gavit, which was built with a donation from Prince Vache I Vachutian in 1224, bears sculptures of a sphinx and a lion attacking a bull. Inside the gavit, one reaches the earliest church, of the 10th or 11th century.

The narthex is four-columned. Built before 1207, it catered to both temples at the same time. It contains a door which led to the communion bread bakery, a small vaulted room. The decoration of the narthex is subordinated to the artistic features of the main temple, which shows especially clearly in ornamental carving. The western portal has, like that of Geghard narthex, a stepped framing that includes the window above. Bas-reliefs are carved on the middle ledge, at the sides of the window. At the right side there is a winged sphinx with a crown on its head, and at the left side a lion attacking an ox.

The shaft of the south-western column of the interior is girdled with an eight-arch arcature, the capital is accentuated, on the transversal axis, by a large rosette above which, on the face of the arch, there is a relief representation of a dove with a lifted wing. The abutment on the western side, corresponding to the column, has smaller vertical divisions than the other wall-attached abutments. Rosettes of various designs, painted white, yellow and red, were cut on the flat ceilings of the corner sections. The decoration of the central section was richer. Floral ornaments covering the shield-shaped pendentives show birds in various attitudes. The girth of transition to the 20-hedral base of the ceiling which probably consisted of six intersecting arches is composed of groove-divided triangular slabs, vertical and inclined.

=== Surb Astvatsatsin church ===
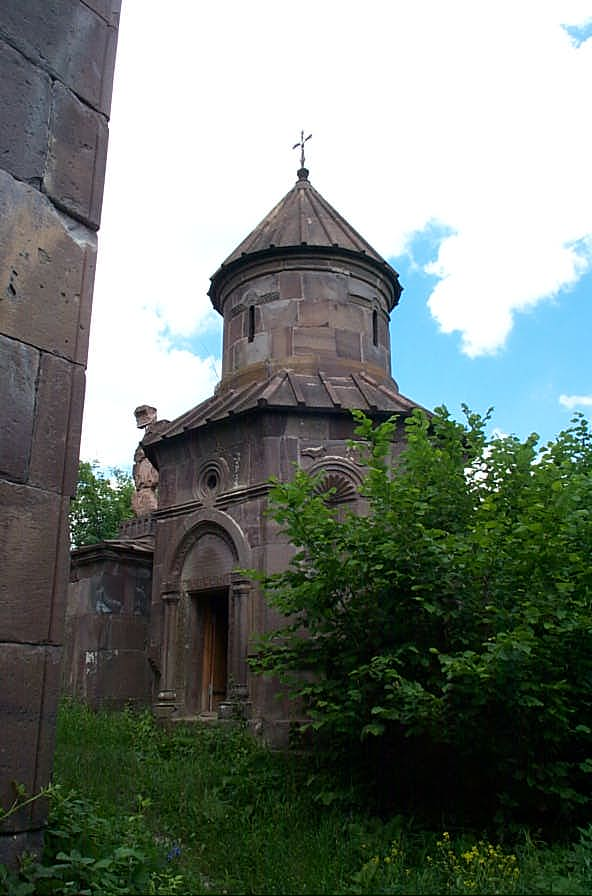
Small round chapel

Outside of these is a small Surb Astvatsatsin (Holy Mother of God) church attributed to Abbot Hovhannes in 1198 in memory of his parents and brothers, with sculpted a portal.

The church is a miniature building, which belongs to the type of the four-apse centric round monuments of the 10th to 13th centuries such as the church of St. Gregory in Sanahin. But as distinct from them the church of Astvatsatsin is round only in its lower part and octahedral in its upper part, with four triangular niches crowned with various conchs. The dome is proportionate to the lower round bulk. The decoration of the church is in stylistic harmony with that of the main temple and the narthex. The profiled girth skirting the building passes across the ends of the niches and the window openings. On the northern side there are eye-catching reliefs of a stork and a snake, and over the southern window a scene showing two beasts locked in a fight.

=== Other structures ===
The most ancient structure of all is Makaravank's 10th-century cross-winged domed church with annexes in the corners, which differs from the ordinary structures of this type by rich carved ornamentation (floral and interlaced linear) on the wall of the altar dais and on the framings of the main windows of the interior.

The small chapels built of ashlar stones have carved door platbands. Makaravank's chapel has a vaulted ceiling.

== Floorplan ==
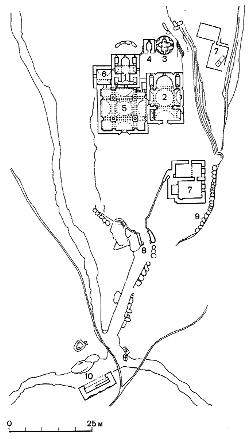

1. a 10th-century church
2. the main temple of St. Astvatsatsin, 1204
3. a rotund church of 1198
4. a chapel of the 12th–13th centuries
5. a gavit, before 1207
6. a communion bread bakery of the 13th century
7. service premises of the 11th–13th centuries
8. the main entrance of the 11th–12th centuries
9. remnants of a fence
10. a spring well of the 12th–13th centuries

== Gallery ==
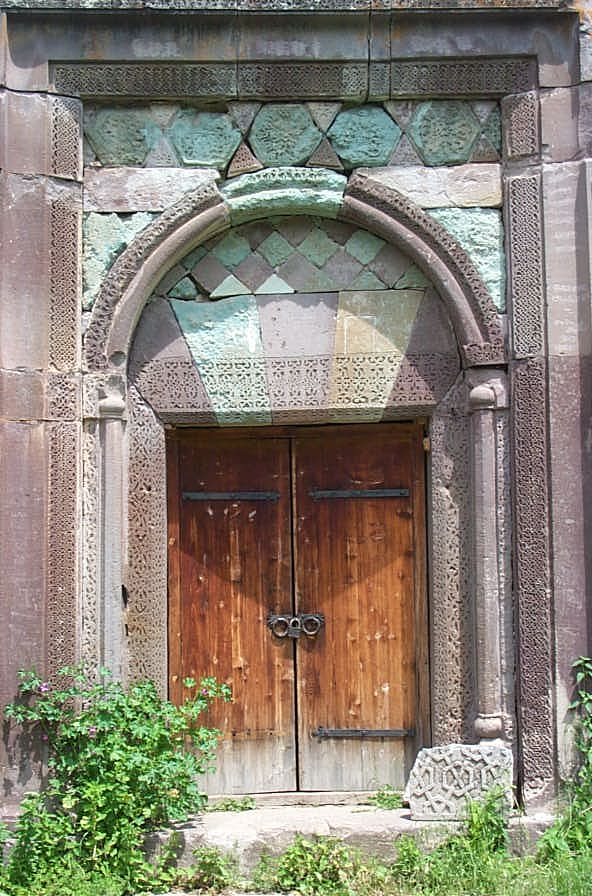
Intricately carved portal.

== Sources ==
- "Architectural Ensembles of Armenia", by O. Khalpakhchian, published in Moscow by Iskusstvo Publishers in 1980.
- "Rediscovering Armenia Guidebook", by Brady Kiesling and Raffi Kojian, published online and printed in 2005.
