= Yell Extreme Park =

Adventure park in Armenia

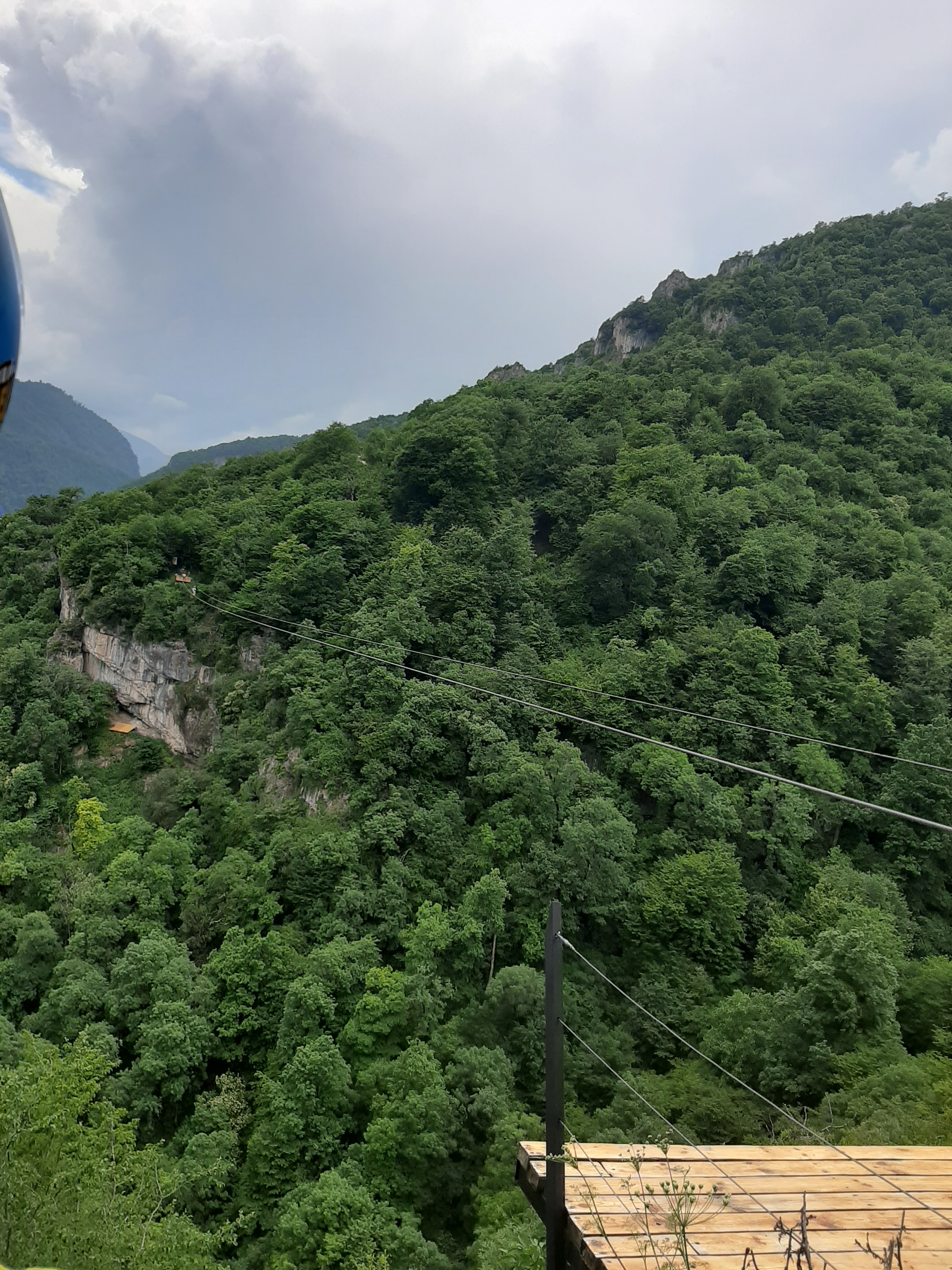
- Armenia
- Interactive map of Yell Extreme Park
- Location: Tavush Province
- Nearest city: Ijevan
- Coordinates: 40°54′49″N 45°05′58″E
- Status: Extreme Park

Yell Extreme Park (Armenian: Յելլ Էքսթրիմ պարկ), is the first adventure park in Armenia. It is in Tavush Province, in the village of Yenokavan. It is a two-hour drive (142 km) north of Yerevan, the capital of Armenia, and two and a half hour from Tbilisi, the capital of Georgia. It is a few kilometers north of the regional capital of Ijevan.

Yell Extreme Park is the first adventure park in Armenia where one can try extreme sports without being a professional. The first flight by the zip-line was done in 2015. Now there are many other activities besides zip-line, including mountain biking, horseback riding, etc. In 2016 people opened the Rope Park.

In the park there is a rest area, where people can rest, eat something, play games like Chess, Monopoly, Risk, Uno, Settlers of Catan, Dungeons & Dragons, Go and much more.

The founder of Yell Extreme Park is Tigran Chibukhchian, whose purpose is to develop extreme tourism and to become a great center of extreme tourism in the region.

== Activities ==
Eight activities are available in the park:

- Zip-line
- Paragliding
- Rope Park
- Off-road
- Via ferrata
- Rock climbing
- Paintball
- Horseback riding
