= Yenokavan =

Village in Tavush, Armenia

Yenokavan Ենոքավան
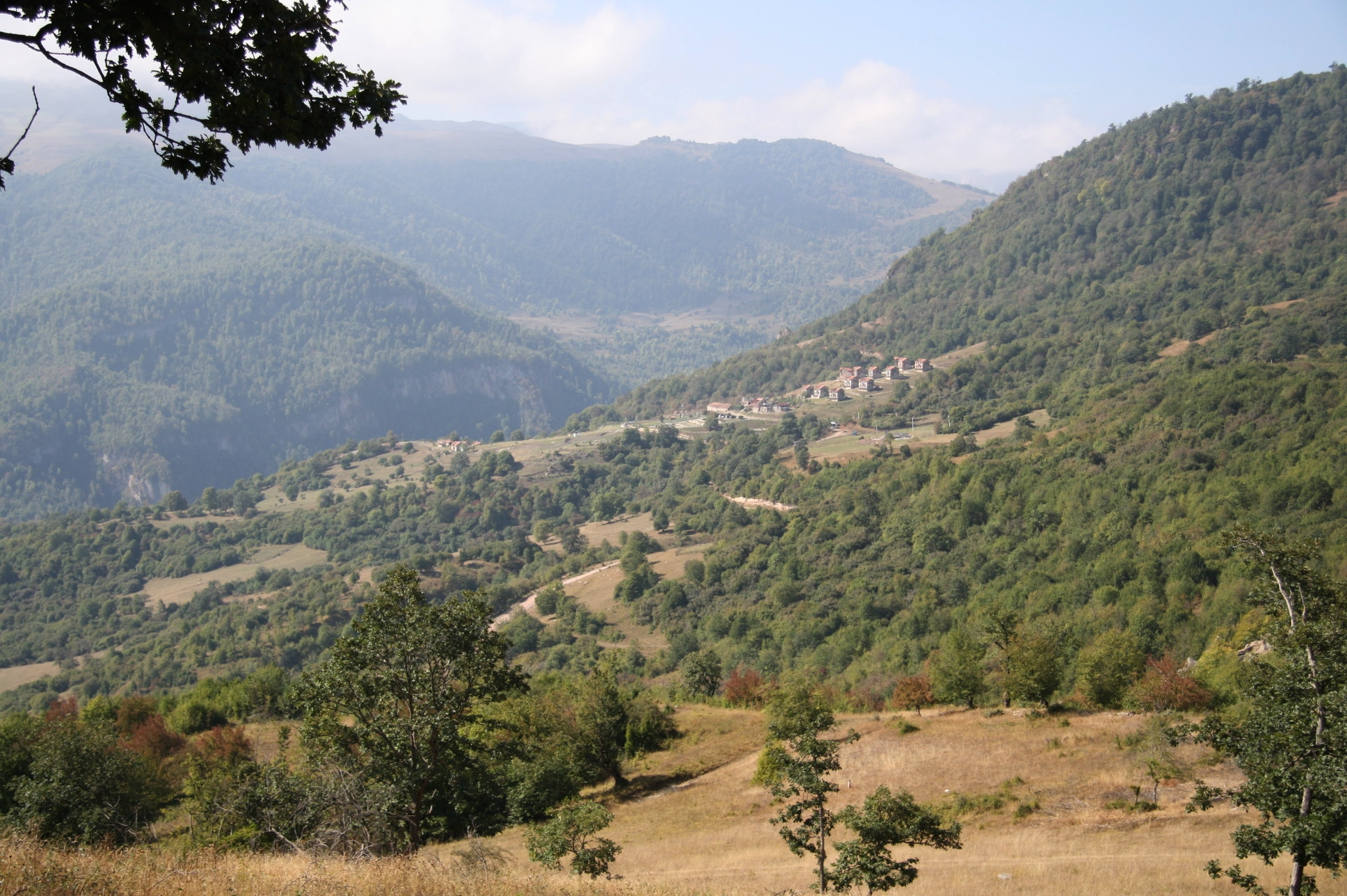
- Agapa Resort in Yenokavan and surrounding landscape

- Location within Armenia Location within Tavush
- Coordinates: 40°54′49″N 45°05′58″E
- Country: Armenia
- Province: Tavush
- Municipality: Ijevan

Population (2011)
  - Total: 537
- Time zone: UTC+4 (AMT)

Yenokavan (Armenian: Ենոքավան) is a village and summer resort in the Ijevan Municipality of the Tavush Province of Armenia. The village is located a few kilometres to the north of the regional capital of Ijevan, close to the main highway. The canyon near the village is lush with forests, rivers and has caves with ancient carvings.

The village features the Yell Extreme Park, an adventure park for various extreme sports. A group of adventurers called the "Yell Extreme Park Team", are planning to install the world's longest zip-line in Yenokavan, at the approximate cost of 200,000 USD.

== Toponymy ==
The village was known as Krdevan until 1935. The village was renamed to Yenokavan in 1935 by the Soviets in honor of Yenok Mkrtumian, the founder of the first Communist party cell in the region.

== Gallery ==
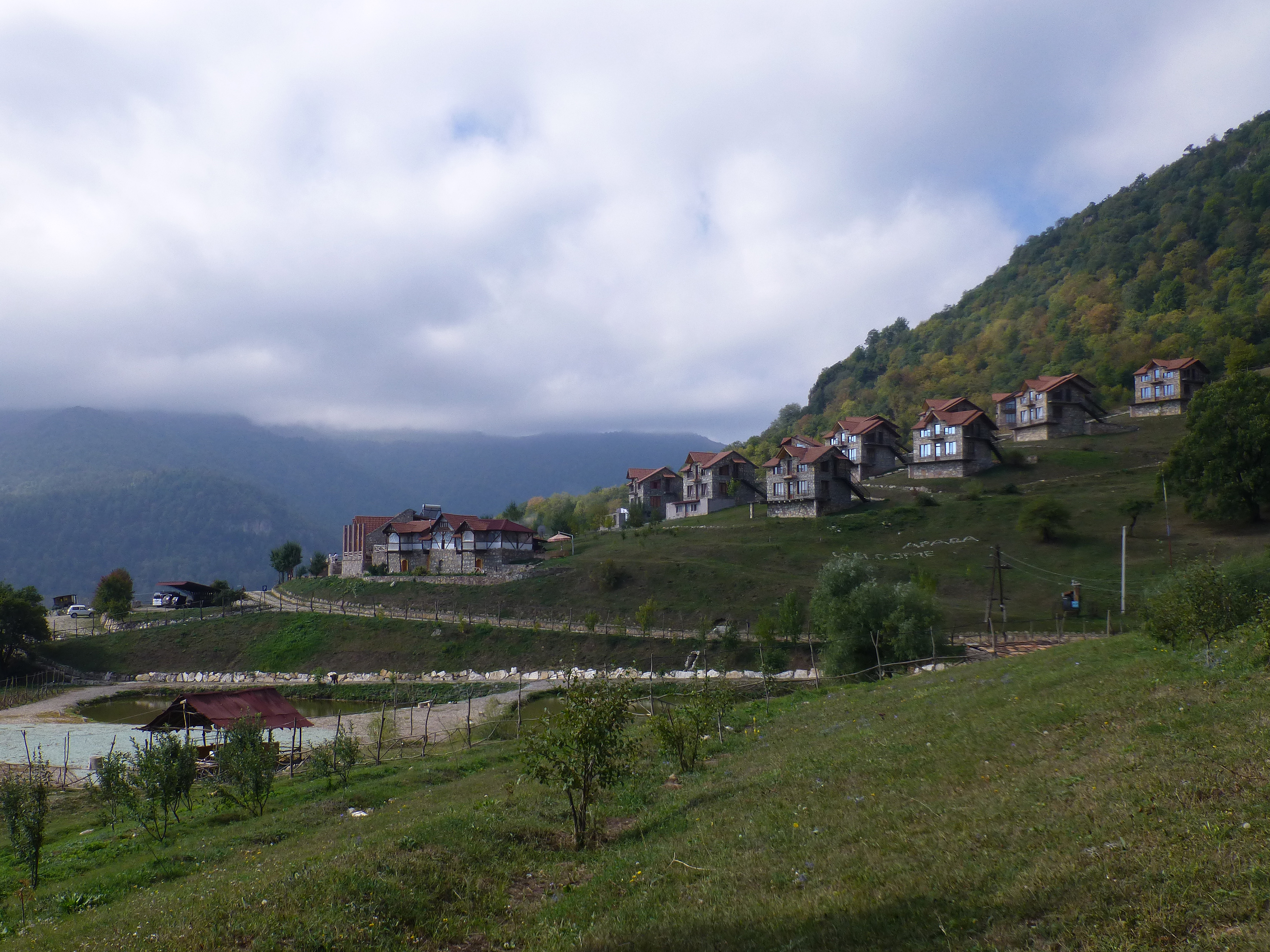
Apaga Resort in Yenokavan

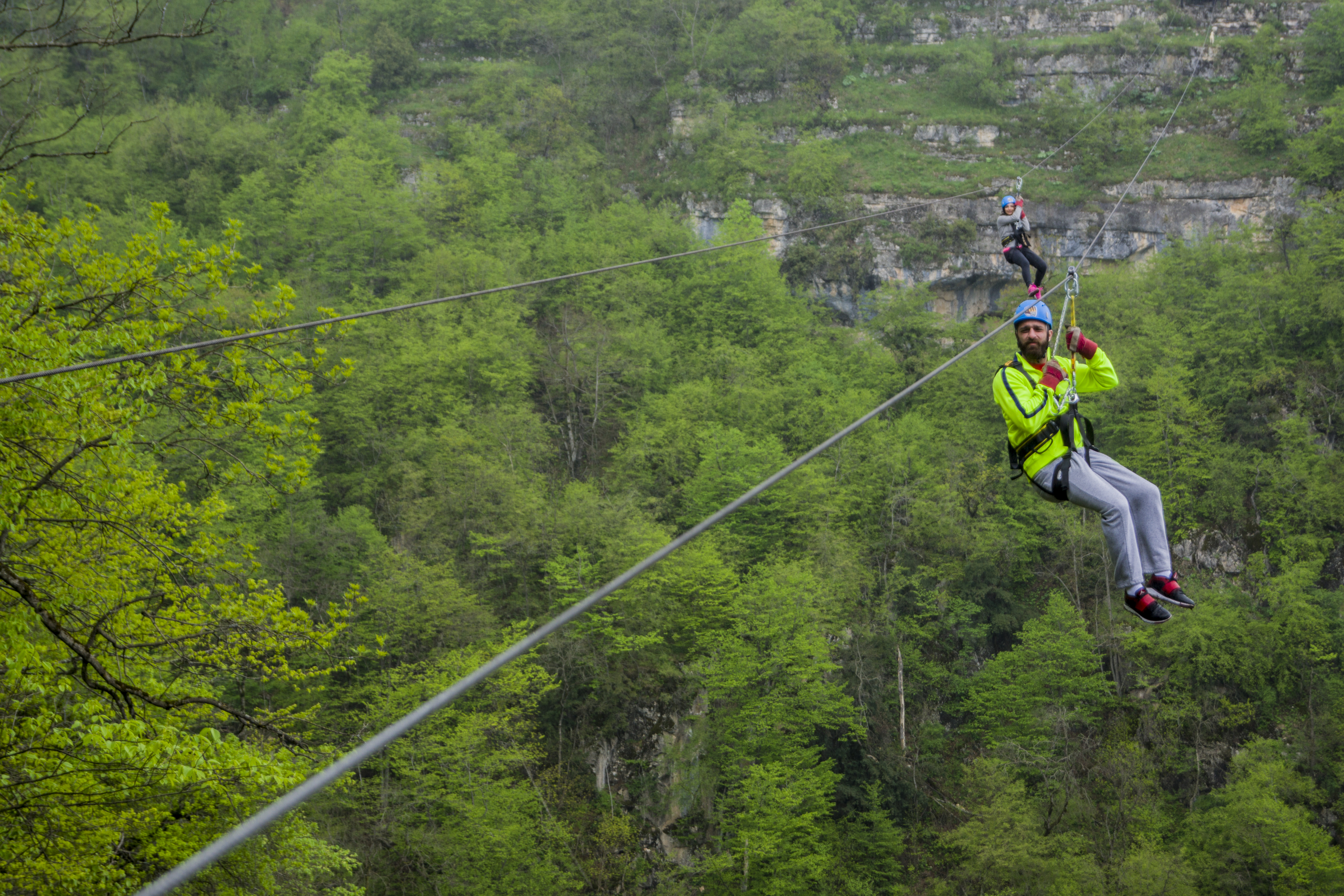
Zipline in the Yell Extreme Park

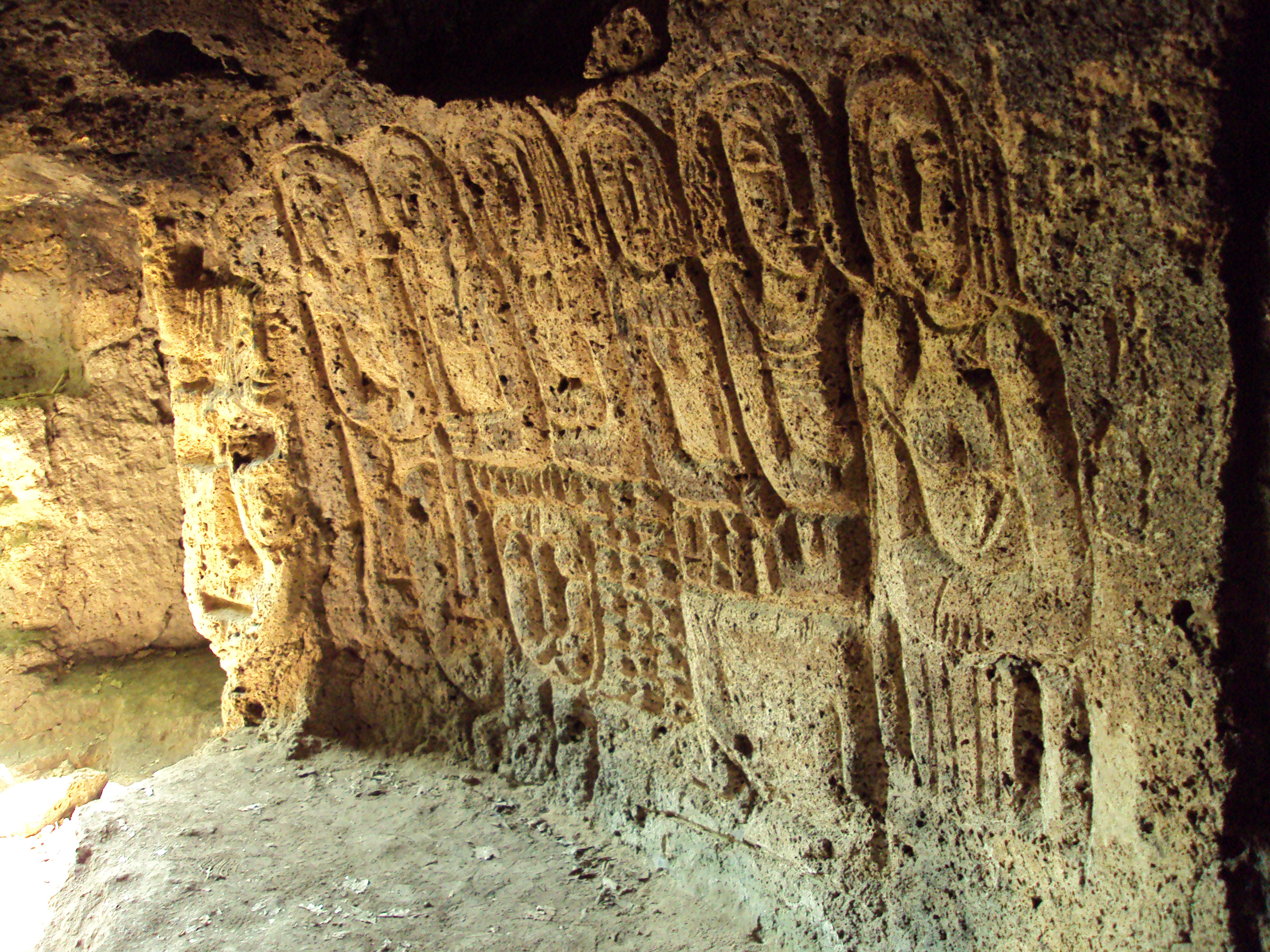
Lastiver cave complex

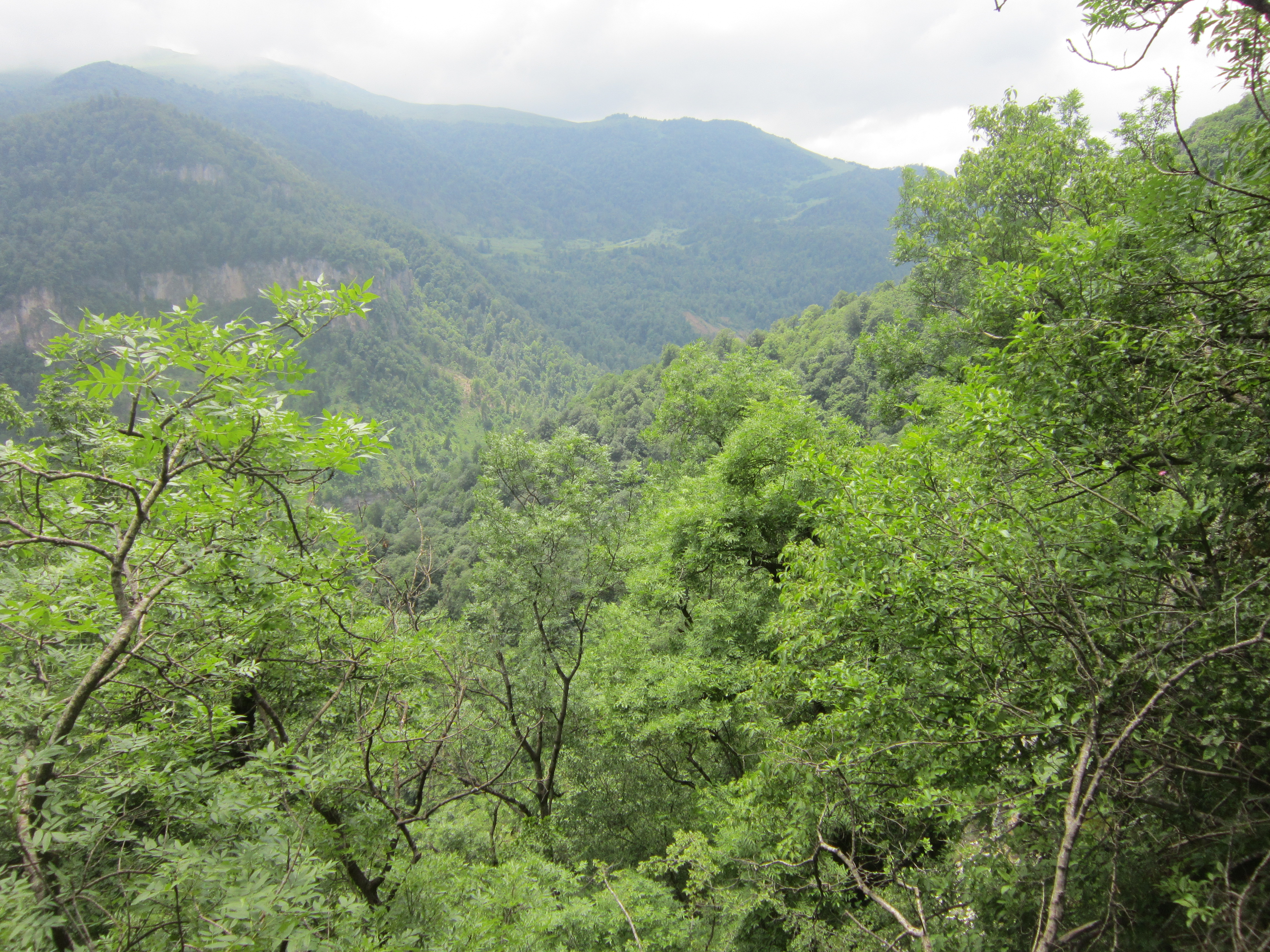
Forests around Yenokavan
