= Gandzakar =

Village in Tavush, Armenia

Gandzakar Գանձաքար
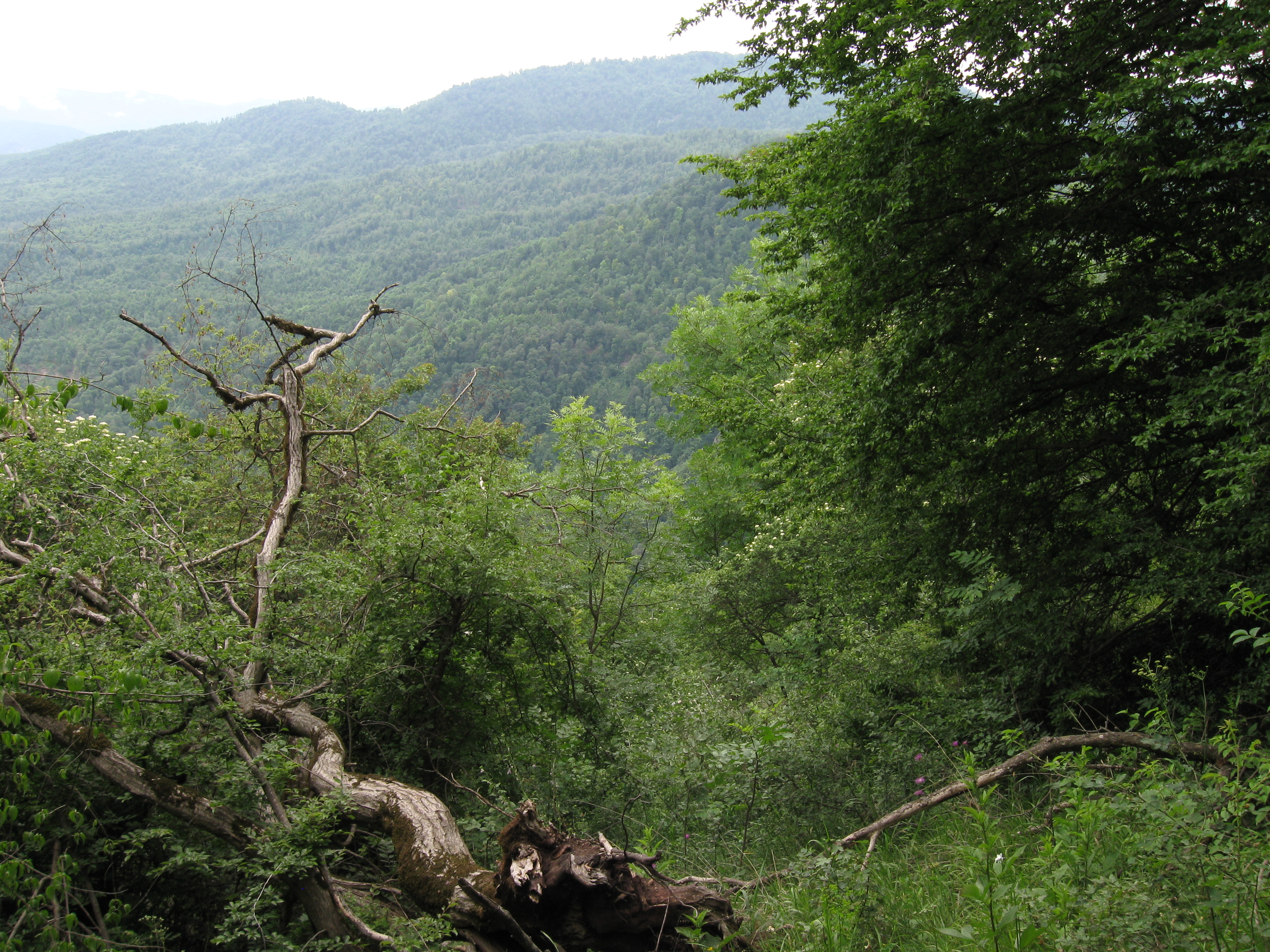
- Nature around Gadzakar

- Location within Armenia Location within Tavush
- Coordinates: 40°50′24″N 45°09′47″E
- Country: Armenia
- Province: Tavush
- Municipality: Ijevan
- Elevation: 850 m (2,790 ft)

Population (2011)
  - Total: 3,434
- Time zone: UTC+4 (AMT)

Gandzakar (Armenian: Գանձաքար) is a village in the Ijevan Municipality of the Tavush Province of Armenia, located to the immediate south of the town of Ijevan.

== Toponymy ==
The village was known as Aghdan until 1978.

== Administration ==
The current mayor of Gandzakar is Shahen Shahinyan. The Deputy Mayor is Zarmayil Mardanyan. The village administration actively works with Peace Corps volunteers.
