= Ijevan Dendropark =

Arboretum in Tavush Province, Armenia

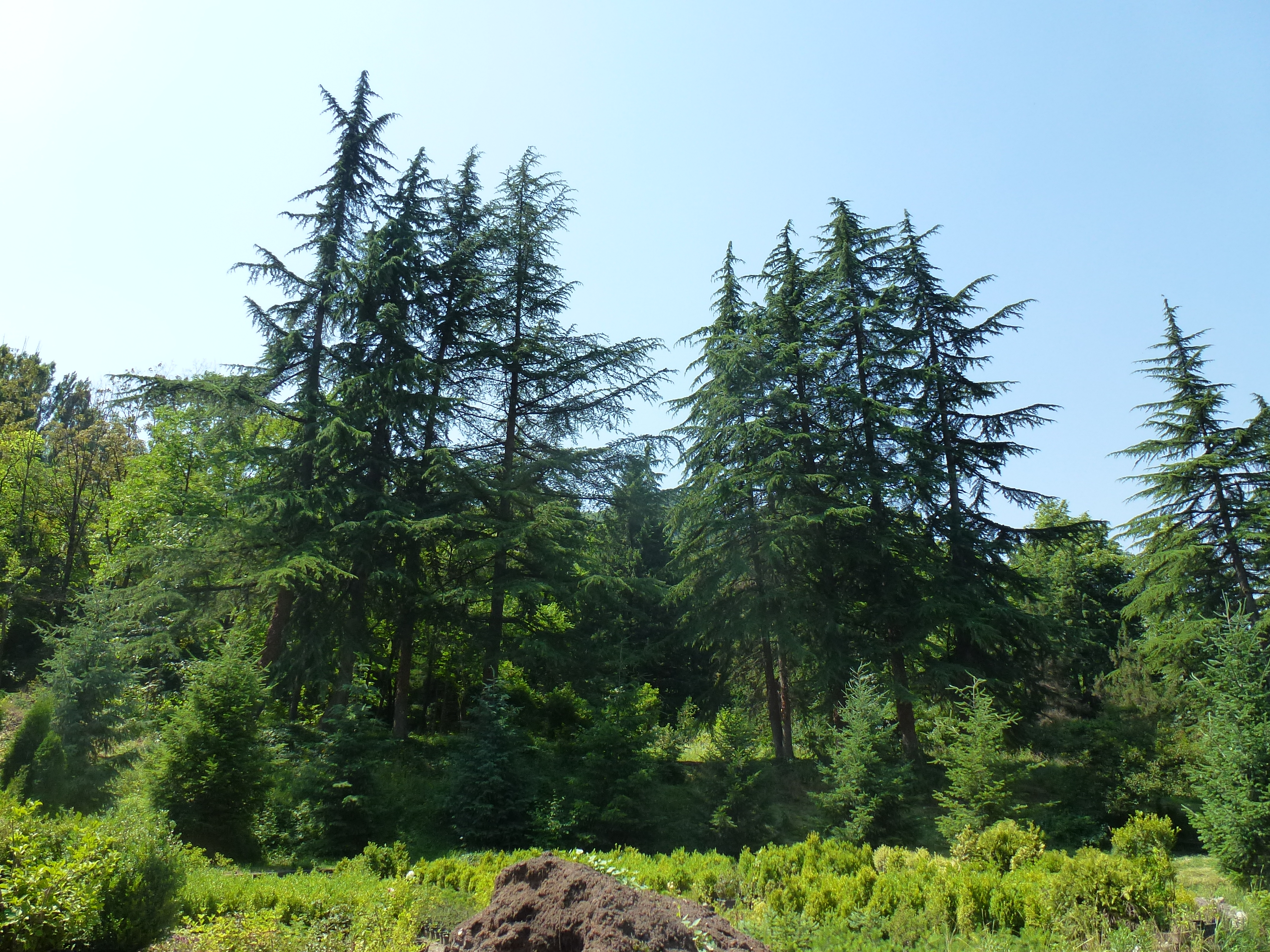
- Ijevan Dendropark

- Location within Armenia
- Nearest city: Ijevan, Armenia
- Coordinates: 40°51′59″N 45°08′15″E
- Area: 8 ha (20 acres)
- Established: 1962

Ijevan Dendropark also known as Ijevan Subtropical Arboretum (Armenian: Իջևանի դենդրոպարկ), is an arboretum located in Ijevan, Tavush Province, Armenia. Located on the right bank of Aghstev river, it was founded in 1962 by Mushegh Aghinyan, Griror Adamyants and Lyudvig Sayadyan.

The plant collection includes over 625 species and varieties.
