= Jemma Ananyan =

Armenian politician

Jemma Gurgenovna Ananyan
- Ջեմմա Գուրգենի Անանյան
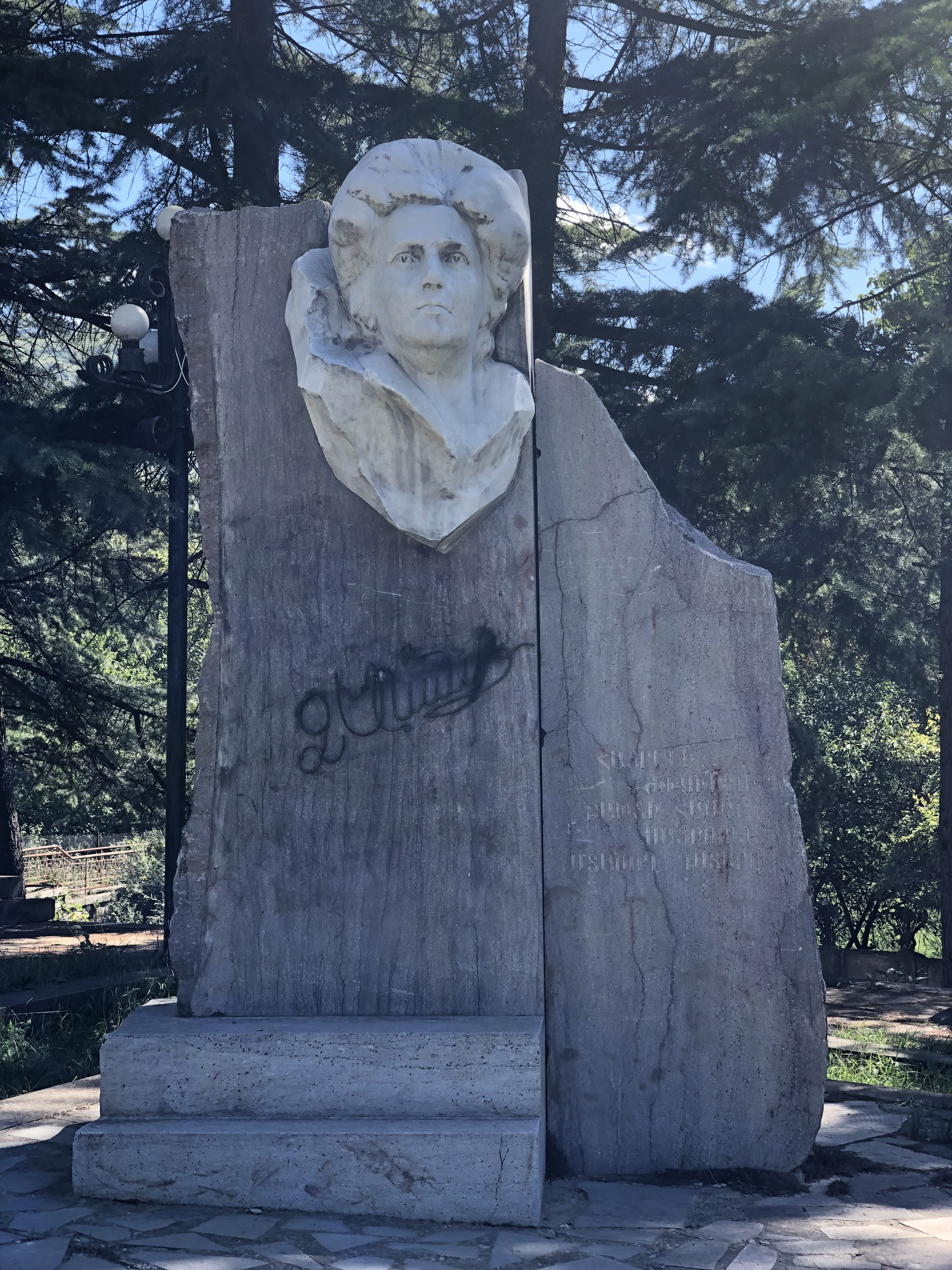
- Statue in Ijevan

Personal details
- Born: 9 June 1931 Ijevan, Tavush, Armenian Soviet Socialist Republic
- Died: 2 September 2018 (aged 87) Armenia
- Party: Communist Party of Armenia (Soviet Union)
- Education: Armenian State Pedagogical University
- Awards: Order of the Badge of Honour

Jemma Gurgenovna Ananyan (Armenian: Ջեմմա Գուրգենի Անանյան; born 9 June 1931 – 2 September 2018) was an Armenian politician of the Communist Party of Armenia (Soviet Union).

== Biography ==
Ananyan was born on 9 June 1931 in Ijevan, Tavush, Armenian Soviet Socialist Republic (ArmSSR).

Ananyan worked as a philologist before becoming a party functionary for the ruling Communist Party of Armenia (Soviet Union).

From 1986 to 1990, Ananyan was the First Secretary of the Idzhevan District Party Committee. She was among the first women elected to the national legislature in May 1990.

Ananyan became the Chair of the Standing Committee on Youth Affairs of the ArmSSR Supreme Council and was then Deputy Chair of the Standing Committee on Social Affairs, Health Care and Nature Protection. She was Governor of the province of Tavush from 1995 to 1999.

Ananyan died on 2 September 2018.
