= Ijevan Wine-Brandy Factory =

Coordinates: 40°51′49″N 45°07′54″E

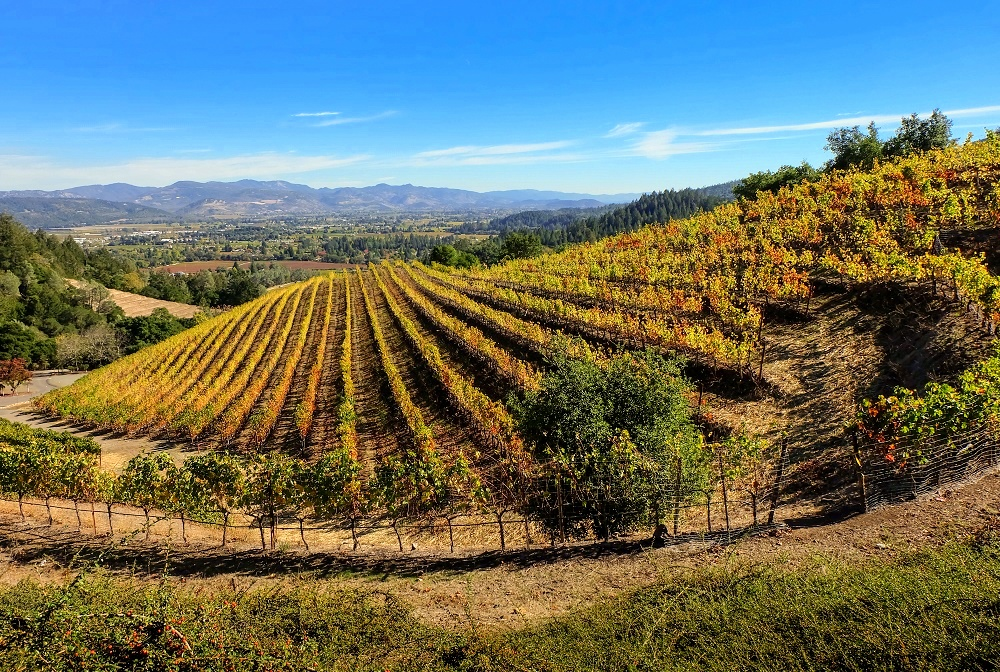
- Company type: Closed Joint-Stock Company
- Industry: Drinks
- Founded: 1951
- Headquarters: Ijevan, Armenia
- Key people: Martin Martirosyan (Executive Manager)
- Products: Alcoholic beverages
- Owner: Emin Yeghiazaryan (Major shareholder)
- Website: www.ijevanwine.am

Ijevan Wine-Brandy Factory (Armenian: Իջևանի գինու-կոնյակի գործարան (Ijevani Ginu-Konyaki Gortsaran)), is a leading enterprise of Armenia for the production of wine, fruit wine and brandy. The factory was opened in 1951 in Ijevan during the Soviet period.

The factory is located on Yerevan Street 9, Ijevan, Tavush Province.

== History ==
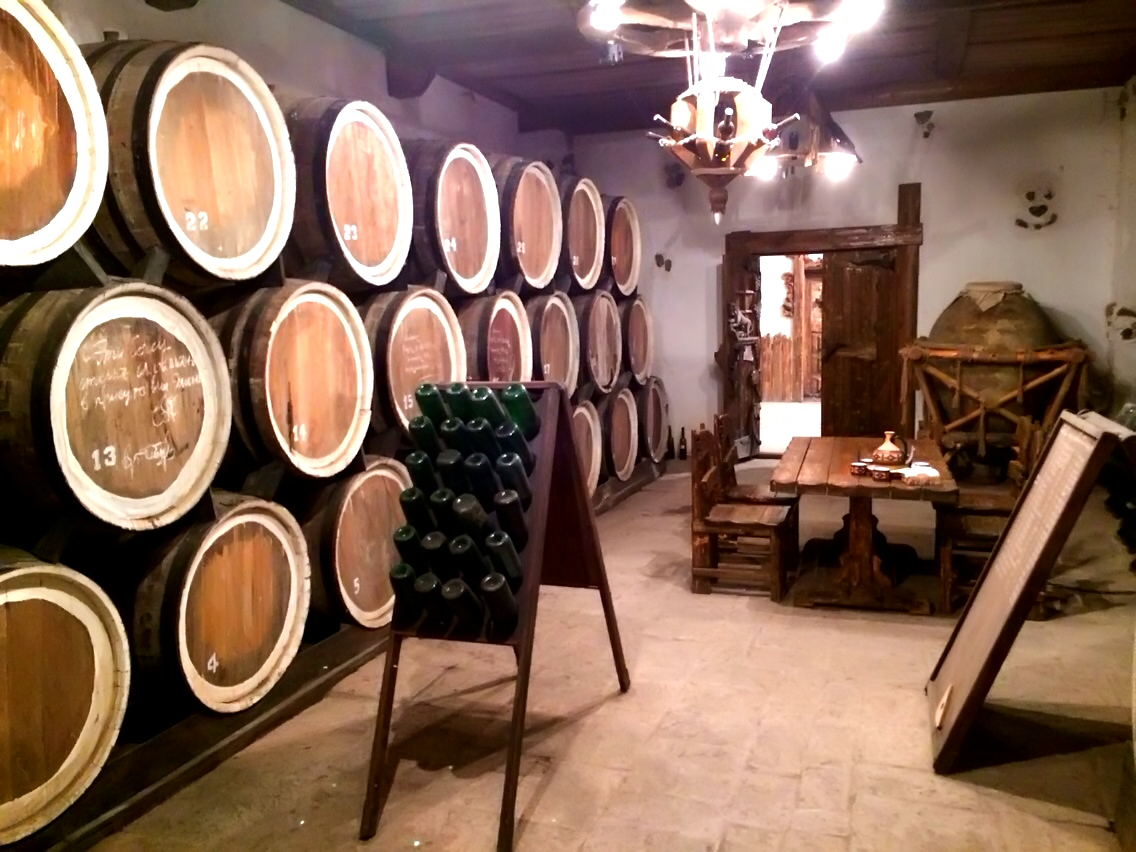
Wine cellars at the Ijevan winery

Modern viticulture in the region of Tavush has been developed since the 1950s. In 1951, the Ijevan Wine-Brandy Factory was founded in to process the grapes of Aghstev and Spitak rivers valley, with more than 3000 ha of vineyards. At the beginning, the factory had produced different types of wine, cognac, as well as champagne. At that period, the plant did not have a bottling line, thus, the entire product was being sent to the Yerevan for the bottling process. During the Soviet days, the production of Ijevan factory has been delivered to different regions of the USSR.

After the collapse of the Soviet Union, the factory was privatized in 1996 to become a closed joint-stock company. The factory was replenished with a modern bottling line, with major renovation and expansion works performed.

Many of the factory's products are exported to Russia, United States, Estonia, Cyprus, Latvia, Canada, and Lithuania.

== Products and brands ==
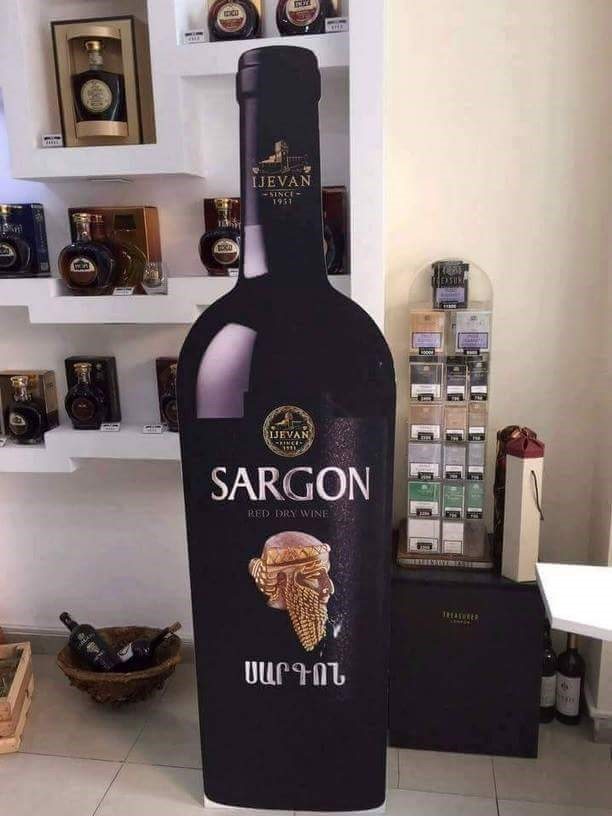
Sargon, red dry wine named after king Sargon of Akkad

Currently, the factory produces wine, fruit wine, sparkling wine, brandy, fruit vodka as well as fruit paste, vegetable preservation and juice.

Wine variety of Ijevan factory includes red and white, dry, semisweet and liqueur wine under the brands of Ijevan, Khachkar, Ijevan Tnakan, Sargon, Ijevan Areni, Ijevan Muscat, Ijevan Saperavi, Ijevan Kagor, Nazeli, Gayane, Vazashen, Haghartsin and the Selected Ijevan special edition of red and white dry wine. It also produces the Old Ijevan red and white vintage wine from the 1977 and 1982 harvest. Haghartsin is white sparkling wine also produced by the Ijevan factory. The company has a variety of fruit wine including pomegranate, blackberry, cornelian cherry, quince, tea rose and cherry.

Transparent white fruit vodka produced by Ijevan includes cornelian cherry, apricot, mulberry and grape.

Armenian brandies produced by Ijevan are also popular, mainly the 40 years old King Abgar, the 20, 25 and 30 years old Nemrut, the 22 years old Ijevan Special Edition and the 15 years old Arqa. Other notable brandies include Ijevan 3 and 5 years old, Ijevan Premium 3 and 5 years old, Ijevan Apricot 5 and 10 years old, Vanuhi 7 years old, and Old Ijevan 10 years old.

== See also ==
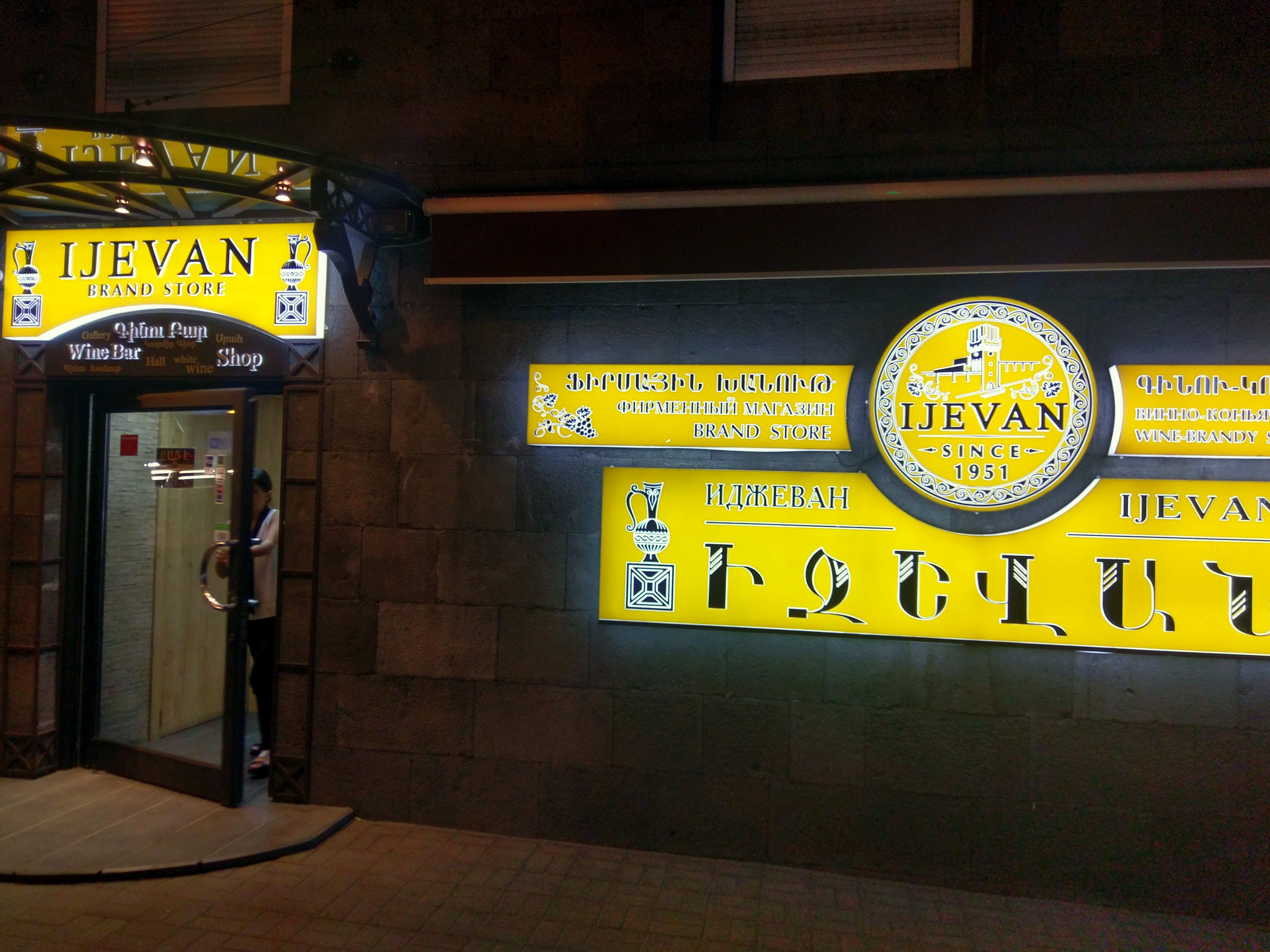
Ijevan brand store in Yerevan

- Yerevan Ararat Brandy Factory
- Yerevan Brandy Company
