= Ijevan =

City in Tavush, Armenia

Ijevan Իջևան
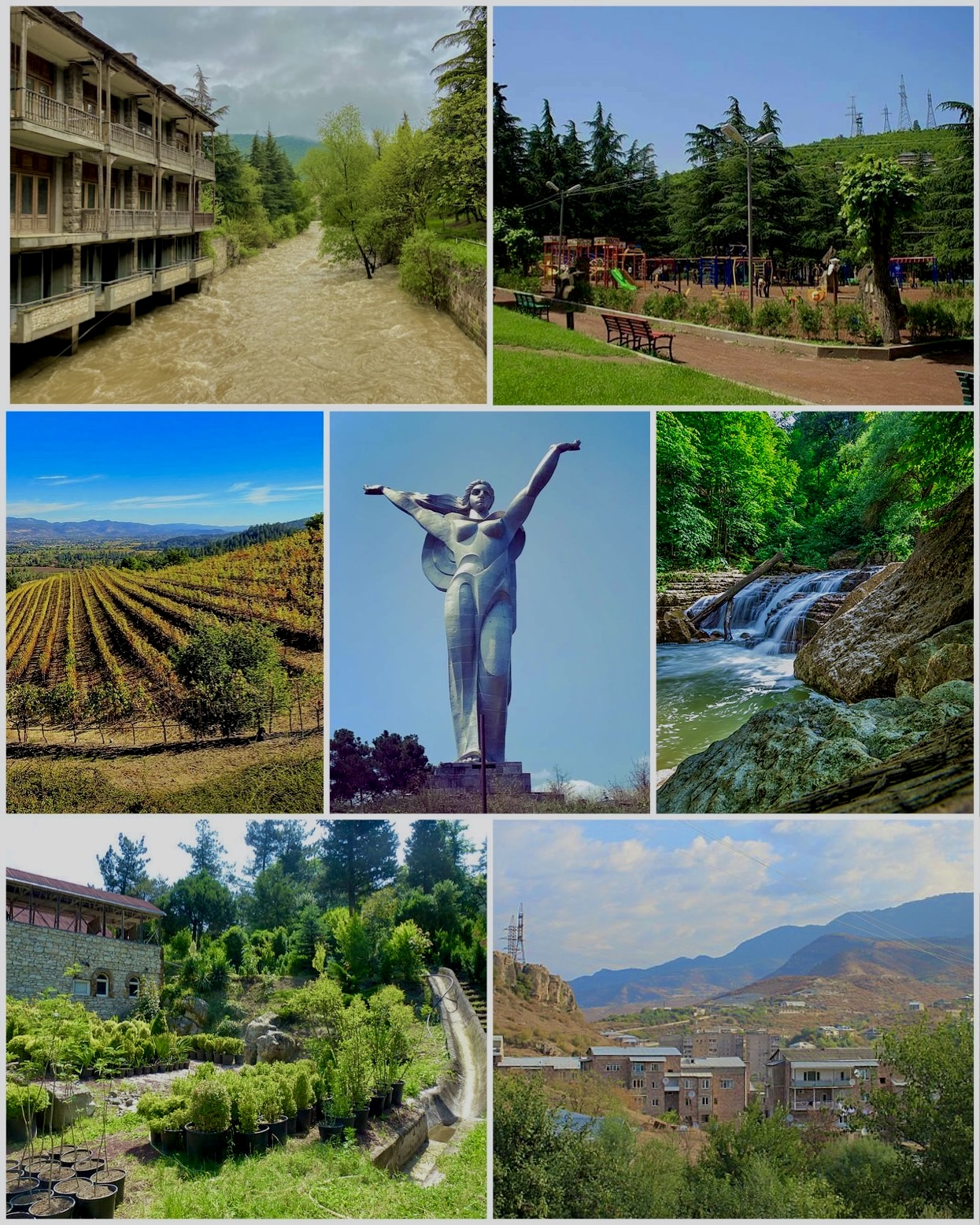
- From top left: Aghstev River • Ijevan central park Ijevan Vineyards • Mother Armenia; Ijevan Wildlife Sanctuary • Ijevan Dendropark; Ijevan skyline and Gugark mountains

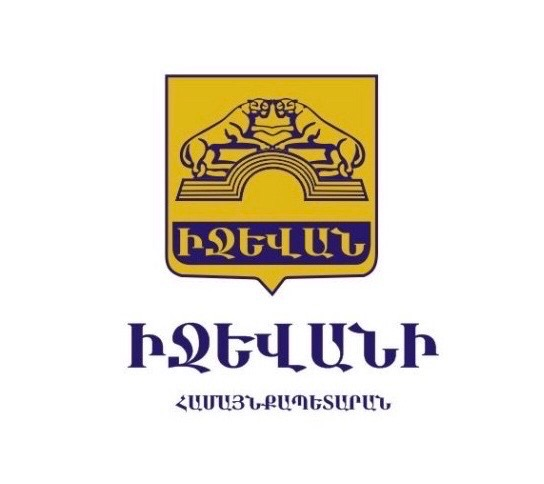
- Seal

- Location within Armenia Location within Tavush
- Coordinates: 40°52′45″N 45°08′50″E
- Country: Armenia
- Province: Tavush
- Municipality: Ijevan
- Founded: 1780s
- City status: 1961

Area
  - Total: 4.6 km^{2} (1.8 sq mi)
- Elevation: 755 m (2,477 ft)

Population (2022)
  - Total: 18,689
  - Density: 4,100/km^{2} (11,000/sq mi)
- Time zone: UTC+4 (AMT)
- Postal code: 4001, 4002
- Area code: (+375) 263
- Vehicle registration: 57

Ijevan (Armenian: Իջևան [id͡ʒɛˈvɑn]) is a city and urban municipal community in the Ijevan Municipality of the Tavush Province of Armenia, also serving as the province's administrative centre. It is located at the center of the region, at the foot of Ijevan ridge of Gugark Mountains, on the shores of Aghstev River. Ijevan is the seat of the Diocese of Tavush of the Armenian Apostolic Church.

Ijevan is located at a road distance of 137 km northeast of Yerevan. The Yerevan-Tbilisi highway passes through Ijevan. As of the 2011 census, the population of the town was 21,081, making it the most populated town in the province. Ijevan is also famous for its beautiful mountains. As of the 2022 census, the population of the town was 18,689.

== Etymology ==
The town's current name Ijevan, and its former name Karavansara (until 1919), both mean "inn" (caravanserai), in Armenian and Persian, respectively. The area of modern-day Ijevan used to have many roadside inns known as caravanserais that served travelers between historic Syria and the North Caucasus. The name Ijevan became official in 1961 when the settlement became a town.

== History ==
Chamber tombs found at the centre of present-day Ijevan, as well as late Bronze Age cemetery on the left bank of Aghstev river, attest to the early occupation of the site.

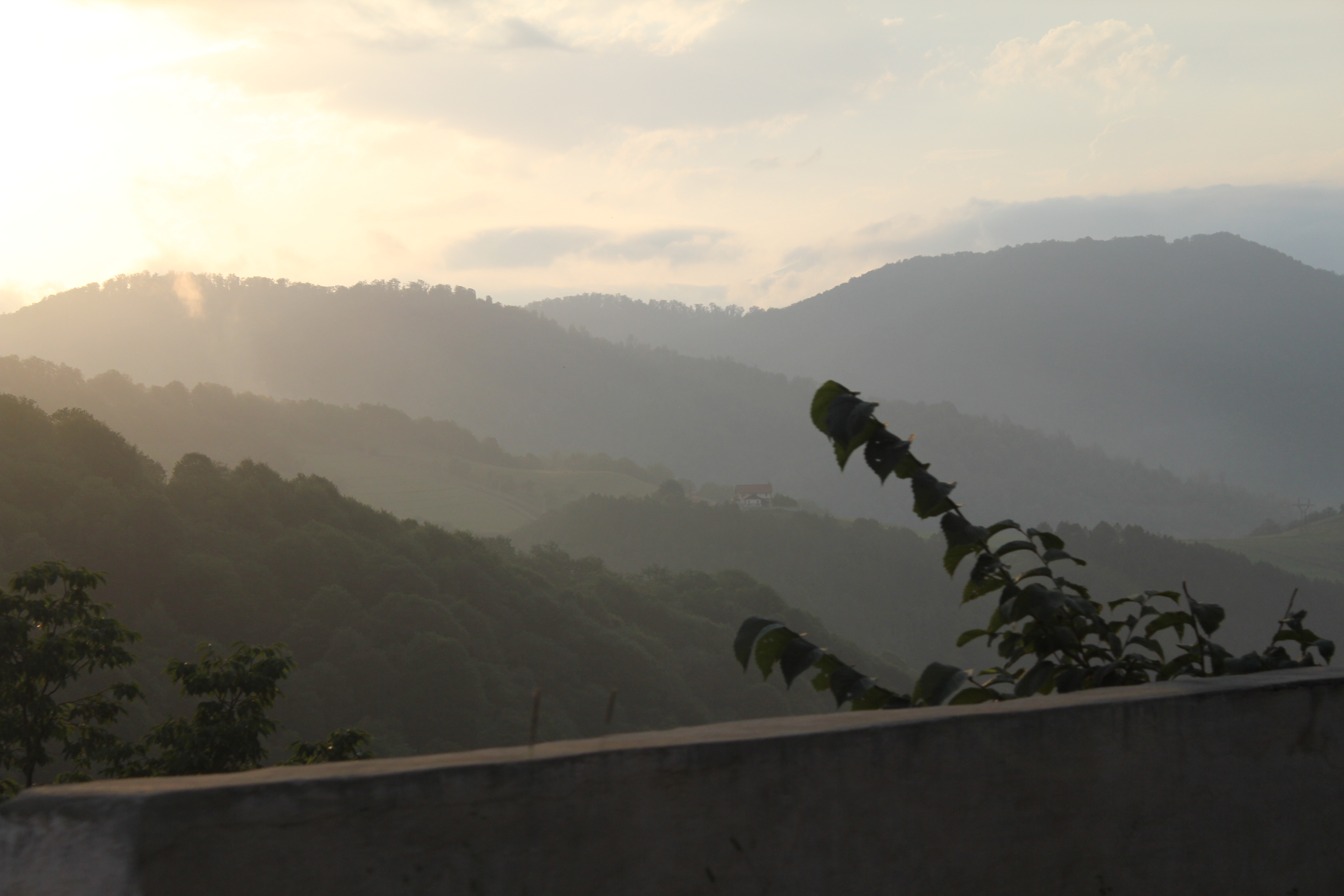
Ijevan countryside

Historically, the area of modern-day Ijevan was part of ancient Utik and Gugark; the 12th and 13th provinces of Greater Armenia respectively. Separated by the Aghstev river, the eastern half of Ijevan was part of the Tuchkatak canton of the historic Utik, while the western half belonged to the Dzorapor canton of the historic Gugark.

Being located on a vital route of trade between the Levant and Northern Caucasus, the region of present-day Ijevan was home to many rest-houses and caravanserais during the Middle Ages, serving as rest-houses for the passing merchants and their caravans, mainly on the road from Tbilisi to Dvin. The remains of a medieval caravanserai stands on the banks of Aghstev river on a site called Hamam-Jala.

Under the Persian rule who had gained control over the Eastern Armenian territories since 1501–02, the village of Karavansara was founded during the 1780s. The territories of present-day Lori and Tavush along with the neighboring Georgia, became part of the Russian Empire in 1800–01. The territories became an official region of Russia as per the Treaty of Gulistan signed between Imperial Russia and Qajar Persia in October 1813, following the Russo-Persian War of 1804–13.

In 1840, the Elizavetpol uezd was formed and most of the territories of Tavush became part of the newly founded administrative division of the Russian Empire. Later in 1868, the Elizavetpol Governorate was established and Tavush became part of the newly formed Kazakh uezd. Under the Russian rule, approximately 6,000 Armenian families from Karabakh were allowed to move to the valley of Aghstev river to be resettled in the region of Tavush including the territory of the village of Karavansara. The village witnessed a notable revival during the 1860s and 1870s, as a result of the new road opened between Kazakh (Qazax) and Erivan (Yerevan), passing through Karavansara.

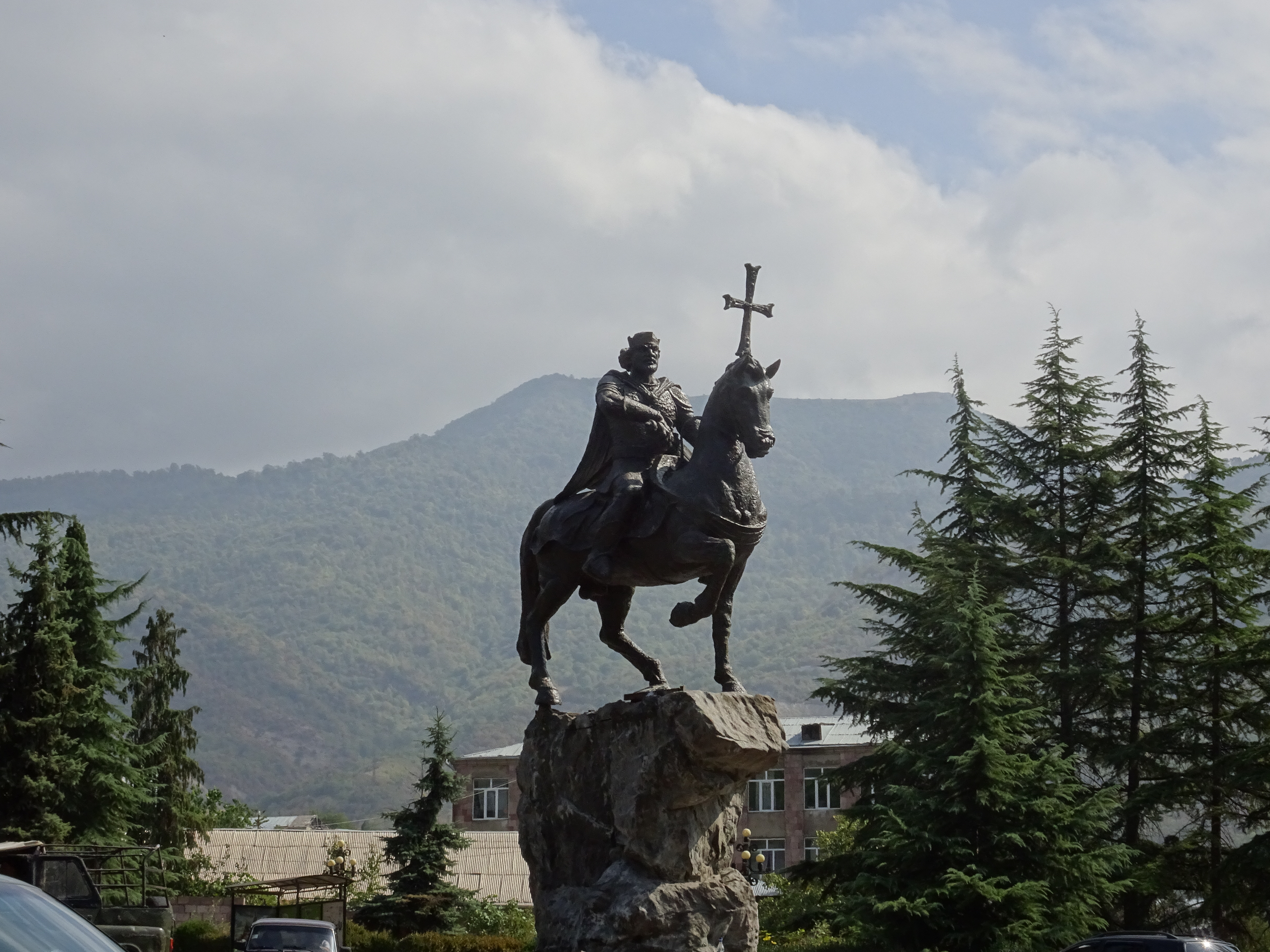
The statue of king Ashot Yerkat in Ijevan

Following the 1918 independence of Armenia, the name of Karavansara was changed to Ijevan in 1919. On 29 November 1920, Ijevan, along with Noyemberyan, was the first Armenian settlement where Soviet rule was established, after being invaded by the Red Army from Soviet Azerbaijan in the northeastern part of the country. In 1930, it became the centre of the newly formed Ijevan raion.

The first major plan of the town was adopted in 1948, revised later in 1967. In 1951, the Ijevan Wine-Brandy Factory was opened, followed by the rug and carpet factory in opened in 1959–65. With the gradual development of the industrial sector, Ijevan was given the status of a town in 1961. In 1970, it was turned into a city of republican sub-ordination of the Armenian Soviet Socialist Republic.

Following the independence of Armenia in 1991, Ijevan became the provincial centre of the newly founded Tavush Province as per the administrative reforms of 1995.

== Geography and climate ==
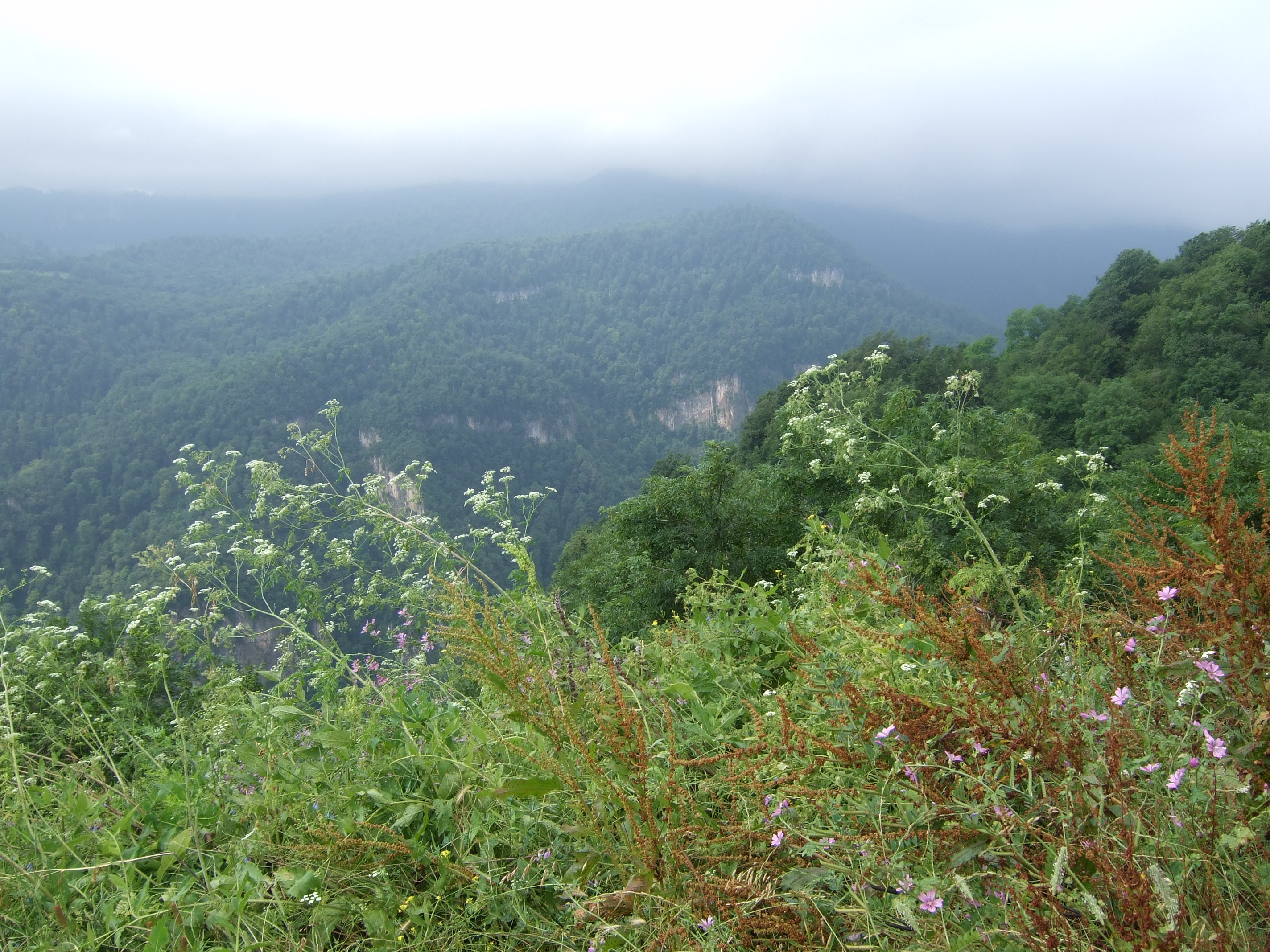
The Lastiver forest at the west of Ijevan

Surrounded by the Gugark Mountains, Ijevan is situated in the valley of the Aghstev river at an average height of 755 metres (2,477 ft) above sea level. The surrounding mountains are covered with thick forests, turning into alpine meadows in some areas.

Ijevan is bordered by the village of Getahovit from the north and the village of Gandzakar from the south. A small lake is found at the southern entrance of the town known as Spitak Jur.

Ijevan has a humid subtropical climate (Köppen Cfa). The average temperature throughout the year is 12.4 °C or 54.3 °F, while in January it is 0.5 °C or 32.9 °F, and in July 23.9 °C or 75.0 °F. The maximum temperature ever registered in Ijevan is 39 °C or 102.2 °F and the minimum −16.1 °C or 3.0 °F. The annual precipitation is 575.2 millimetres or 22.65 inches.

Climate data for Ijevan (1991–2020), extremes 1981–2020
Month	Jan	Feb	Mar	Apr	May	Jun	Jul	Aug	Sep	Oct	Nov	Dec	Year
Record high °C (°F)	21.0 (69.8)	22.5 (72.5)	29.0 (84.2)	34.5 (94.1)	31.0 (87.8)	36.0 (96.8)	38.0 (100.4)	39.0 (102.2)	34.7 (94.5)	31.5 (88.7)	28.0 (82.4)	26.0 (78.8)	39.0 (102.2)
Daily mean °C (°F)	0.5 (32.9)	1.6 (34.9)	6.1 (43.0)	12.0 (53.6)	17.0 (62.6)	20.7 (69.3)	23.9 (75.0)	23.5 (74.3)	19.3 (66.7)	13.4 (56.1)	7.6 (45.7)	2.6 (36.7)	12.4 (54.2)
Record low °C (°F)	−16.1 (3.0)	−15.3 (4.5)	−10.8 (12.6)	−8 (18)	1.2 (34.2)	5.6 (42.1)	8.8 (47.8)	9.9 (49.8)	4.2 (39.6)	−2 (28)	−10.2 (13.6)	−14.5 (5.9)	−16.1 (3.0)
Average precipitation mm (inches)	19.7 (0.78)	27.6 (1.09)	47.8 (1.88)	70.5 (2.78)	95.1 (3.74)	81.6 (3.21)	58.6 (2.31)	35.5 (1.40)	40.2 (1.58)	45.5 (1.79)	33.5 (1.32)	19.6 (0.77)	575.2 (22.65)
Average precipitation days (≥ 1.0 mm)	3.9	5.5	7.9	10.8	14.5	10.7	7.3	5.5	5.8	7.6	5.7	4.3	89.5
Average relative humidity (%)	69.4	69	70	73.5	75.6	71.9	69.5	67.2	73.1	77.9	75.1	71.4	72.0
Mean monthly sunshine hours	118.4	120	136.3	138.7	172.4	210.6	205.2	198.7	175.3	137.2	119.9	110.7	1,843.4
Source: NOAA

== Demographics ==
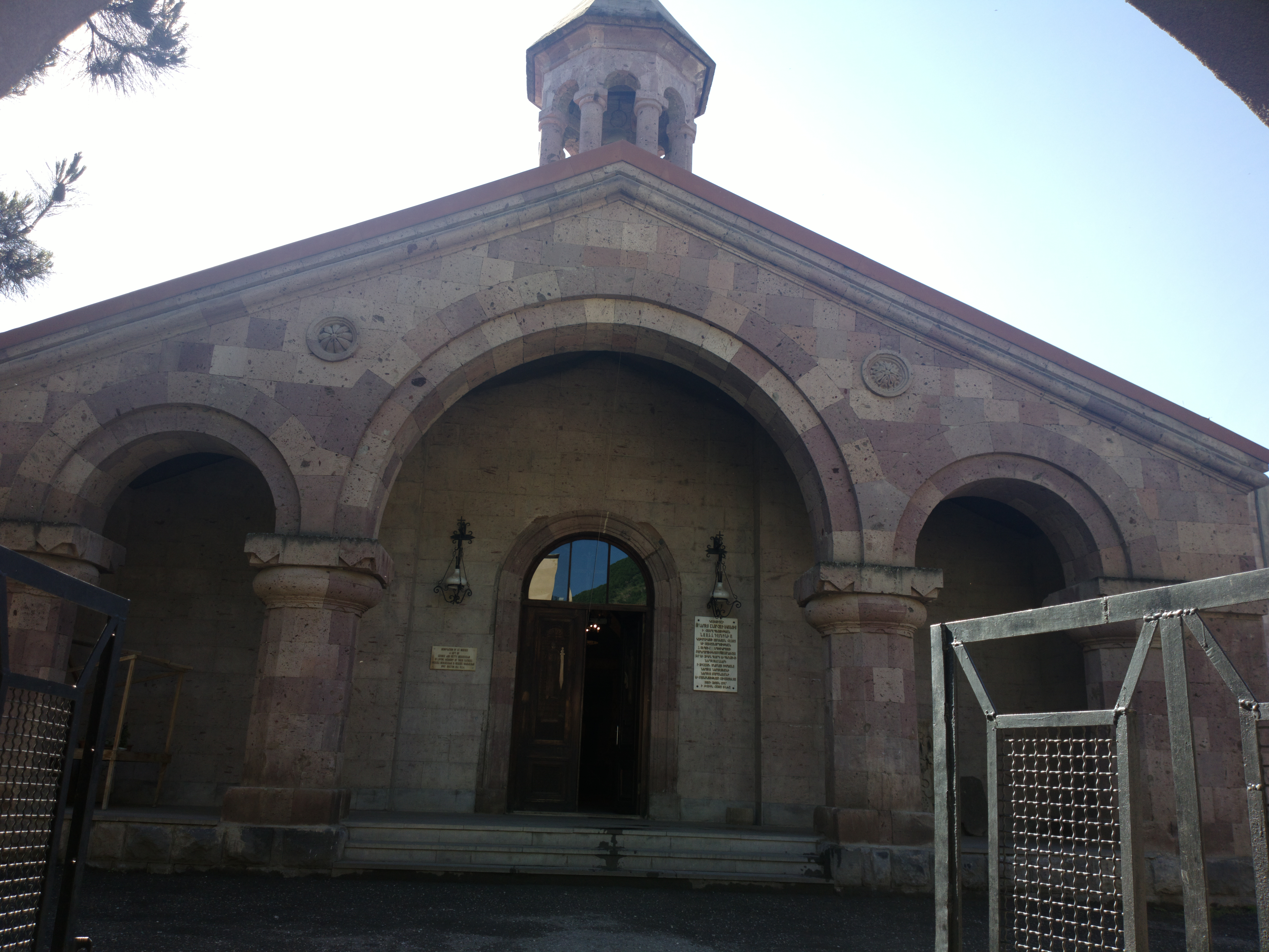
Surp Nerses Cathedral

Ijevan is the largest urban community of Tavush. The majority of the town's population are ethnic Armenians who belong to the Armenian Apostolic Church. The regulating body of the church is the Diocese of Tavush, headed by Archbishop Yeznik Petrosyan.

The seat of the Diocese of Tavush is the Surp Nerses Cathedral in Ijevan opened in 1997, after the reconstruction of a former cultural centre built by the Soviets in the 1950s. The project was financed by the US-based Armenian benefactors Kevork and Berjuhi Nersesian from Boston. The other church of the town known as the Holy Saviour's was consecrated in 2012. Financed by the Ukraine-based Ghazaryan family who are natives of Ijevan, the church was built between 2009 and 2012 on the foundations of a 19th-century church ruined during the Soviet days.

As of the 2011 census, the population of the town was 21,081, making it the most populated town in the province. As per the 2016 official estimate, the population of Ijevan is around 20,700. As of the 2022 census, the population of the town was 18,689.

Historical population
Year	Pop.	±% p.a.
1831	440	—
1873	1,016	+2.01%
1897	1,790	+2.39%
1926	2,261	+0.81%
1939	4,426	+5.30%
1959	7,639	+2.77%
1976	15,006	+4.05%
1989	18,681	+1.70%
2001	20,223	+0.66%
2011	21,081	+0.42%
2022	18,689	−1.09%

== Culture ==
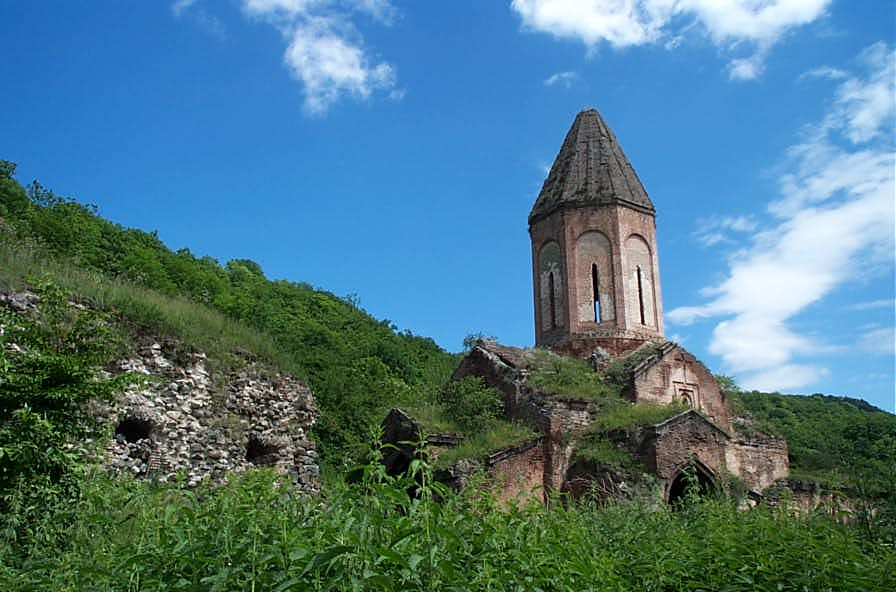
Kirants Monastery near Ijevan

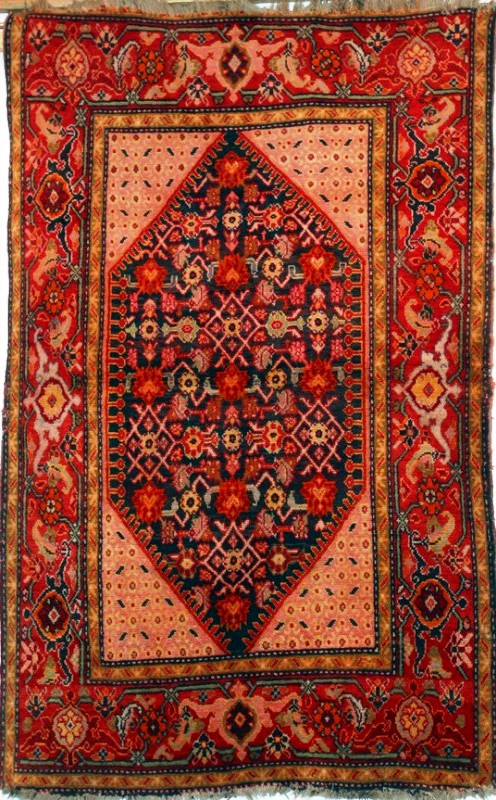
Hand-made Armenian rug from Ijevan

According to popular tradition, King Artavasdes I built a city on the territory of present-day Ijevan during his reign in the 2nd century BC. He gathered only attractive girls and boys from all over Armenian regions, so that later they would get married and settle in the newly established town. Thus, the citizens of modern-day Ijevan are the successors of the handsome generations formed 2000 years ago.

Ijevan and its countryside are home to several cultural heritage monuments of the Armenian Architecture, including:

- Surp Hovhannes Church of the 13th century, located at the west of the town.
- Makaravank monastery of the 10th century located around 15 km north of Ijevan near the Achajur village. This purple and green stone complex in the forest above the village is a tourist destination.
- Arakelots Monastery of Kirants, dating back to the 13th century, located few kilometers north of Ijevan.
- Kirants Monastery of the 8th century, 10 km north of Ijevan.
- The monastery of Gandzakar village, located few kilometers south of Ijevan.
- The remains of King Ashot Yerkat fortress of the 10th century, 7 km southwest of Ijevan.
- The remains of Aghjkaberd fortress of the 13th century, 10 km southwest of Ijevan.

Ijevan was used to host an annual symposium of sculpture between 1985 and 1990 with the presence of many experts from all over the world. Therefore, the residents of Ijevan started to call their town "the city of 100 sculptures". Currently, there are 116 sculptures erected at Ijevan sculptures garden at the centre of the town.

The ethnographic museum of Ijevan was reopened in 1999 while the art gallery was renovated in 2003. The town is also served by a house of culture, a school of music, a school of arts, and an art gallery. Ijevan is a major centre for traditional Armenian handmade rugs and carpets.

The town has its local "Ijevan TV" station.

== Transportation ==
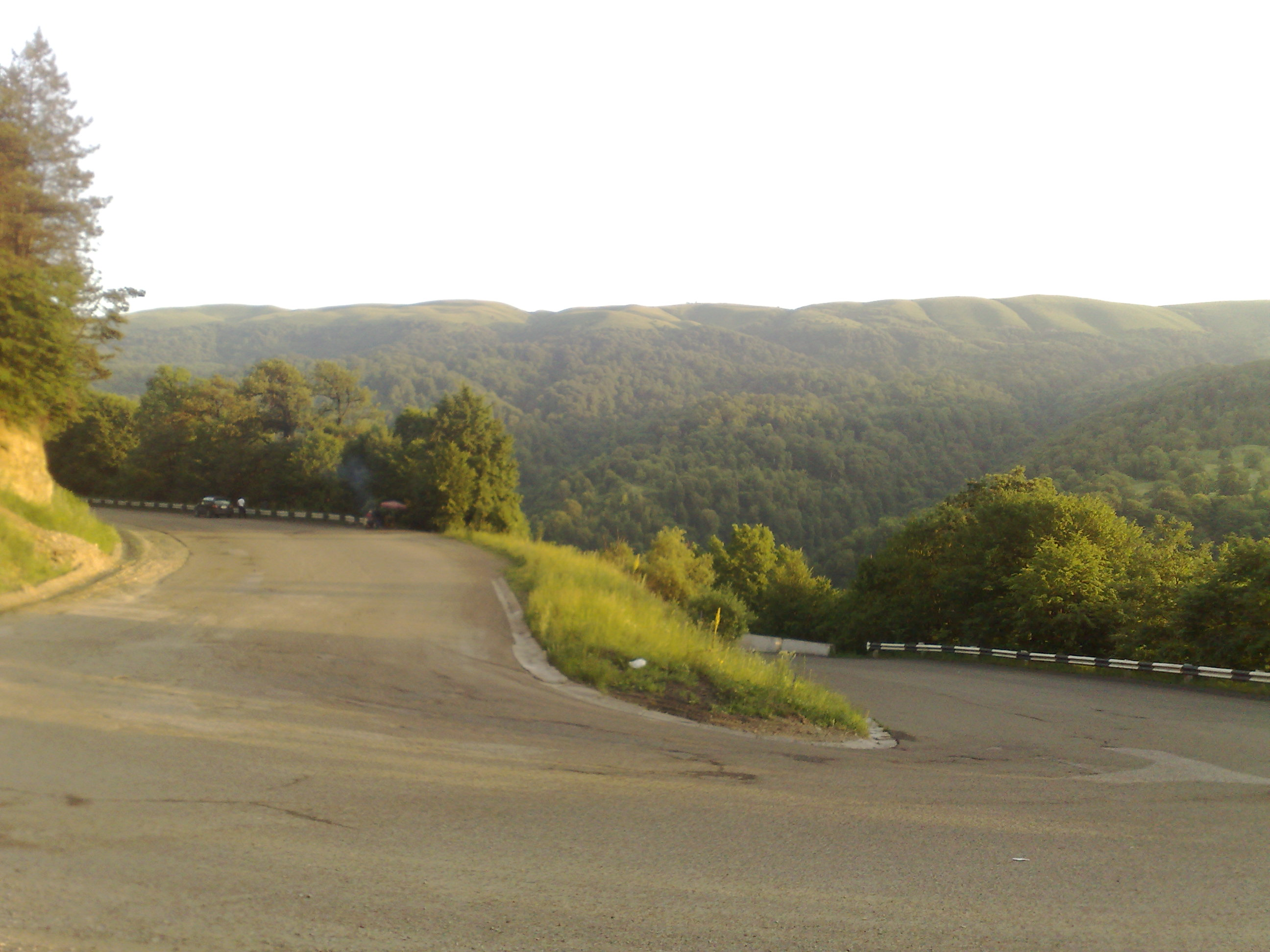
On the Ijevan-Dilijan road

Ijevan is connected with the capital Yerevan and the rest of Armenian territories through the M-4 highway. The highway extends through the Armenia-Azerbaijan border 16 km northeast of the town.

Domestically, Ijevan is connected with the surrounding towns and villages of Tavush Province through a network of regional roads.

In the late 1980s the town had a railway station on the line between Yerevan and Ganja, Azerbaijan. Following the dissolution of the Soviet Union, the station was closed with no rail services up to the present day, although the possibility of reopening the line is under consideration as of 2021.

== Economy ==
=== Industry ===
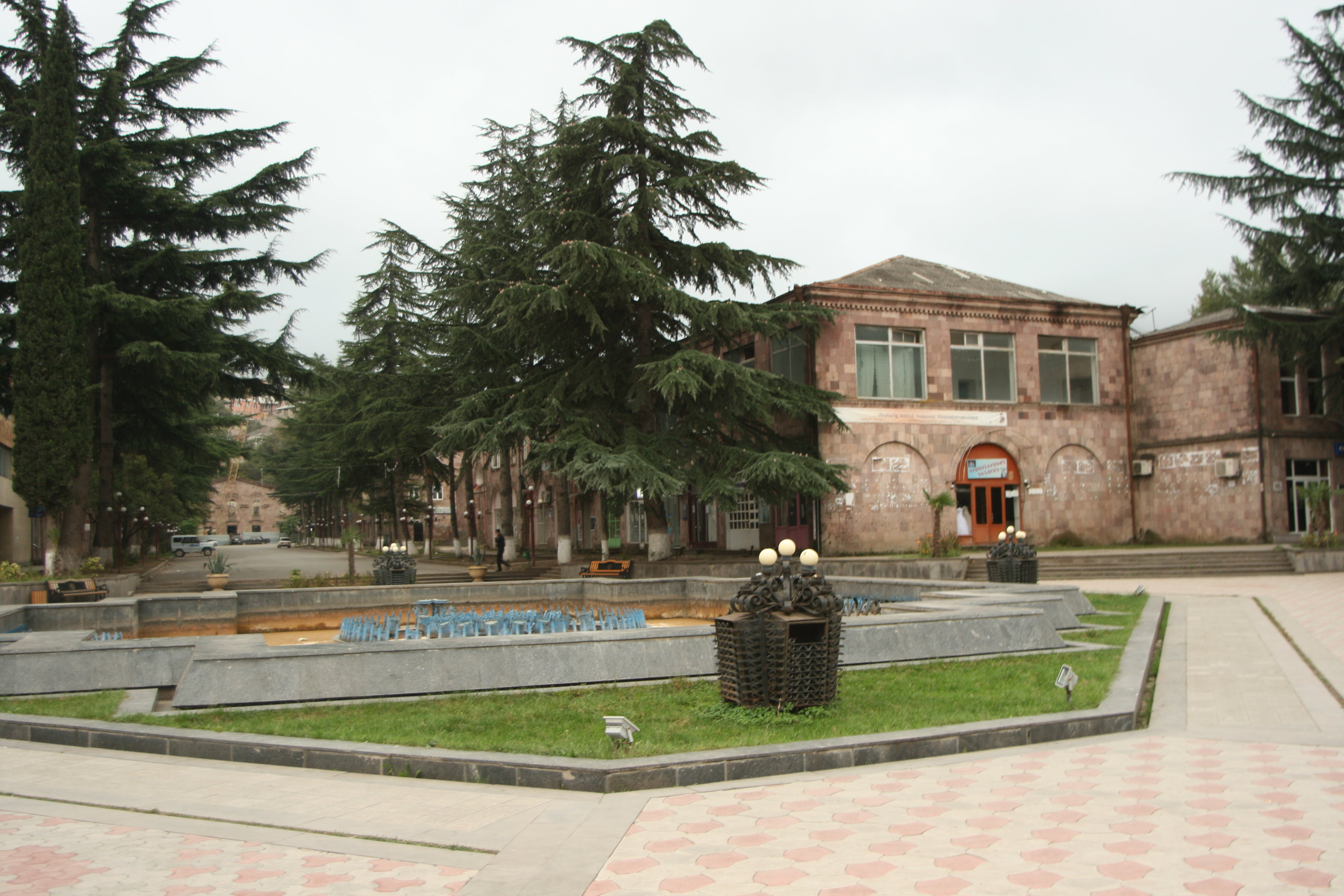
The centre of Ijevan

Ijevan is the economic centre of Tavush. During the Soviet period, the town had witnessed a remarkable industrial progress especially in the field of carpet manufacturing and wood processing. Only one of the Soviet era manufacturing is still operating in Ijevan, this being the Ijevan Wine-Brandy Factory founded in 1951 (particularly famous for its pomegranate wine). The Ijevan carpet weaving mill was the largest in the Caucasus and the 3rd-largest in the whole Soviet Union. After the independence of Armenia, many small industrial plants were founded, including the "Karart" stone processing plant (since 2003).

In 2014, the "Vector" company for software development was opened in Ijevan.

However, unemployment rates remain high in Ijevan and the entire region.

=== Tourism ===
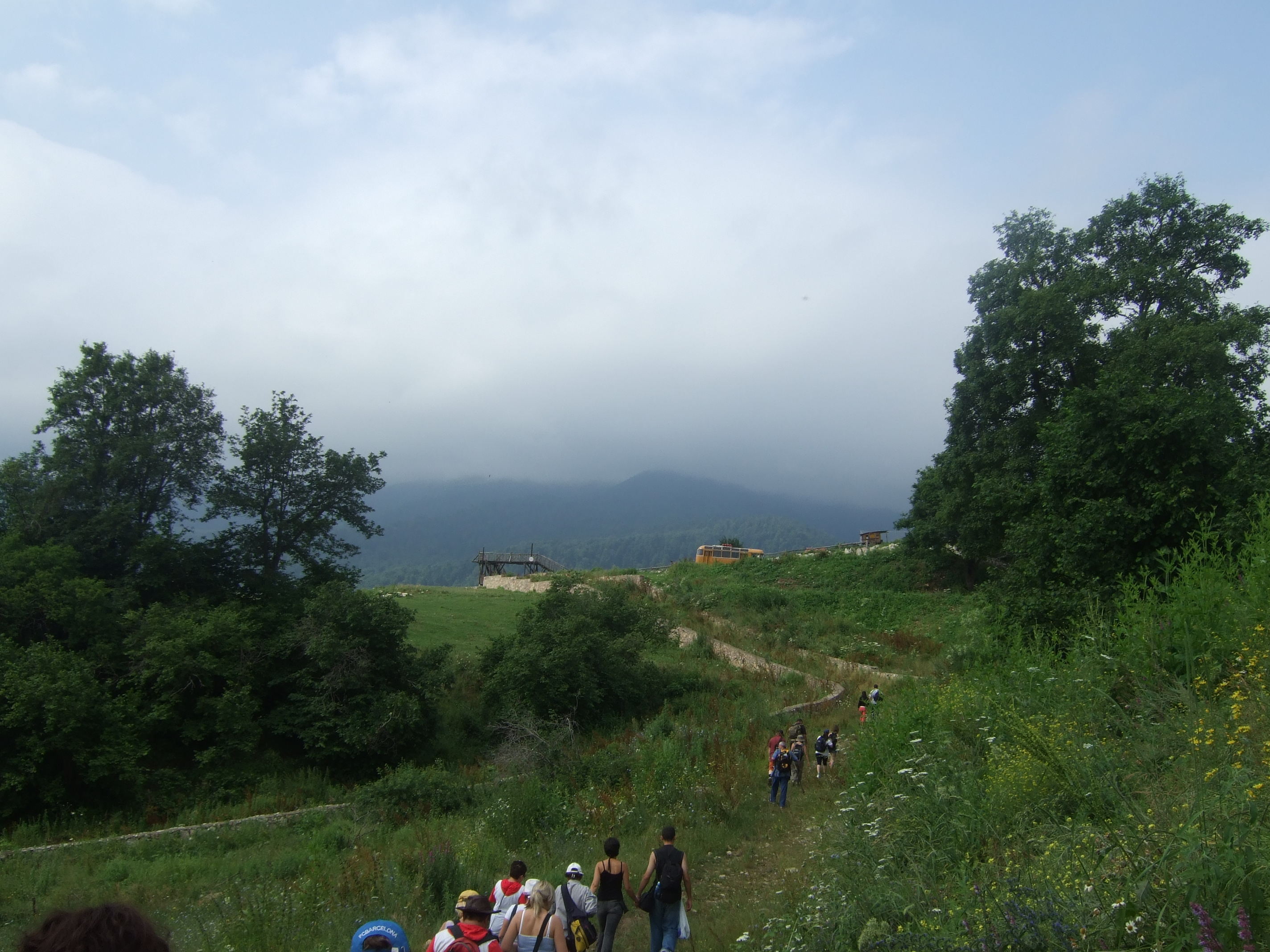
Hiking at the Ijevan sanctuary

Tavush is one of the most picturesque regions in Armenia. Nestled in the valley of Aghstev surrounded with forests and high mountains, Ijevan is more likely a forest-resort. The town did have a 200-bed high-rise hotel built in 1969 on the northern side of the main road which is now in ruins due to vandalism.

The Ijevan Sanctuary is a protected wildlife sanctuary at the west of the town, covering an area of 59 km^{2}.

The Yenokavan canyon near the village of Yenokavan village just to the north of Ijevan is among the most visited destinations in the region. It has a number of cliffs, caves, forests, rivers and waterfalls. "Anapat cave" has pre-Christian carvings that resemble Mayan and Aztec works. There are small rest houses and a modern resort in the Yenokavan canyon.

== Education ==
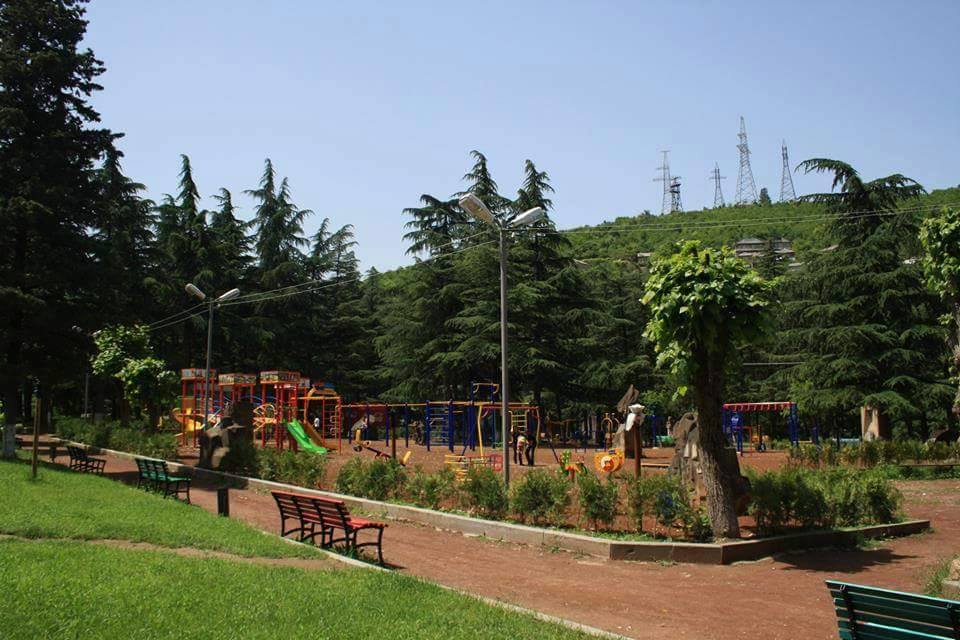
Ijevan central park

Ijevan is home to 6 public education schools and 3 pre-school kindergartens.

The Ijevan campus of the Yerevan State University is operating in the town since the 1994–95 academic year. As of 2016–17, with more than 700 students, the Ijevan campus is home to 4 faculties:

- Natural Sciences,
- Humanities,
- Economics,
- Applied Arts.

== Sport ==
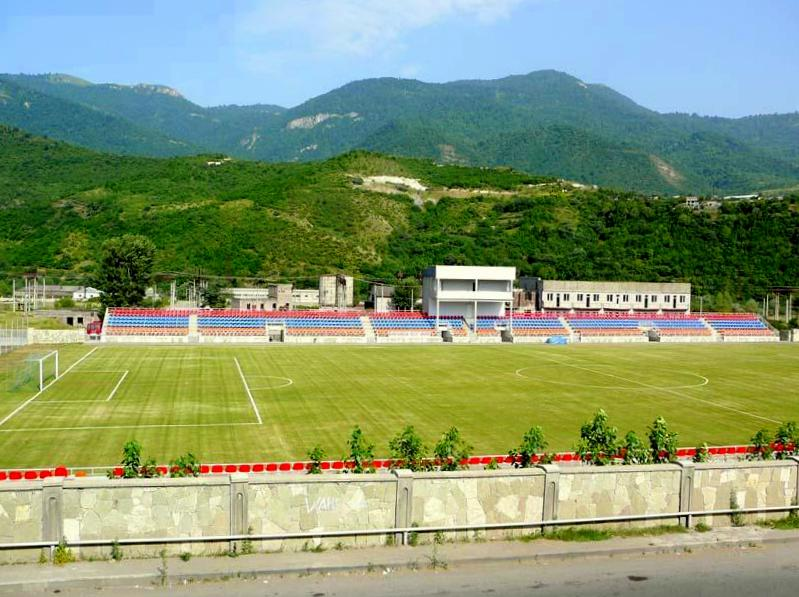
Arnar Stadium

Ijevan is home to the all-seater Arnar Stadium, built in 2007 and hosted the Armenian Independence Cup final match in 2008 for the first and the only time being played outside the capital Yerevan.

FC Bentonit Ijevan was the only professional football club in the town, dissolved in 2007 due to financial difficulties. Currently, the town has an under-19 football club known as FC Nikarm, operating since 2000.

The town has a children and youth sport school run by the municipality.

Ijevan is the venue of the annual MultiForce off-road racing international competition, that attracts participants from Armenia and the neighboring countries.

== Twin towns – sister cities ==
Ijevan is twinned with:

- Kostroma, Russia (2014)
- Valence, France (1996)

=== Partnerships ===
Ijevan also cooperates with:

- Dessie, Ethiopia (2022)

== Notable people ==
- Jemma Ananyan, politician of the Communist Party of Armenia (Soviet Union)
- Grigor Jaghetyan, politician who served as Minister of Finance of the First Republic of Armenia
- Garnik Avalyan, former member of the Armenia national football team
- Nikol Pashinyan, politician and current Prime Minister of Armenia

== See also ==
- Ijevan Dendropark
- Ijevan Wine-Brandy Factory
