= Lusahovit =

Lusahovit Լուսահովիտ
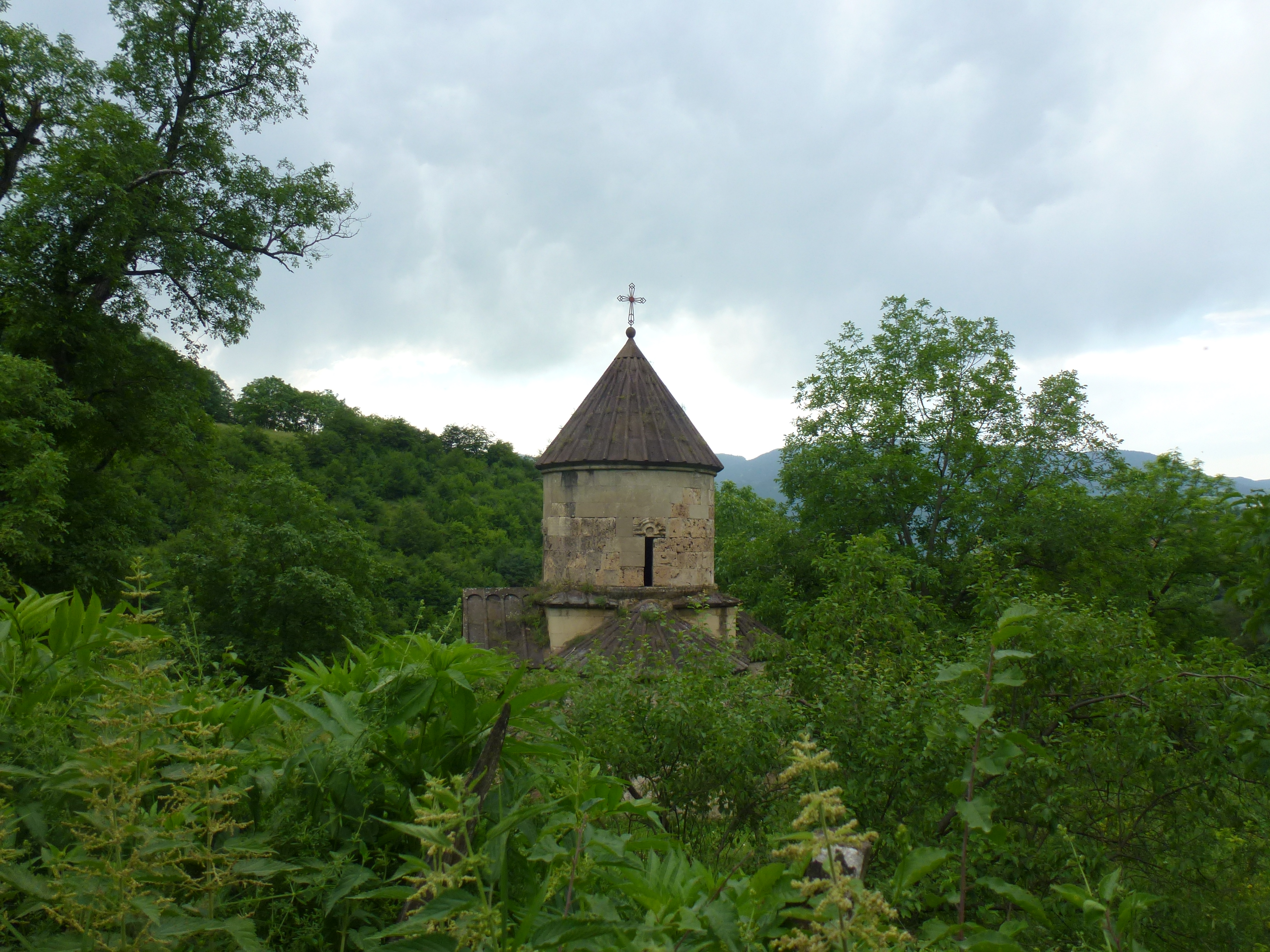
- Tsrviz Chapel near Lusahovit

- Location within Armenia Location within Tavush
- Coordinates: 40°57′N 45°11′E
- Country: Armenia
- Province: Tavush
- Municipality: Ijevan

Population (2011)
  - Total: 364
- Time zone: UTC+4 (AMT)

Lusahovit (Armenian: Լուսահովիտ) is a village in the Ijevan Municipality of the Tavush Province of Armenia. The 5th-century Tsrviz Chapel is located near Lusahovit.

== Toponymy ==
The village was previously known as Tsrviz and Tsrrvis.
