= Tsrviz Chapel =

Chapel in Tavush, Armenia

Coordinates: 40.913139°N 45.193417°E

Tsrviz Chapel (Armenian: Ծռվիզի Մատուռ) or Moro-Dzoro (Armenian: Մորո-Ձորո) is a medieval Armenian chapel located near the village of Lusahovit in the Tavush Province of Armenia.

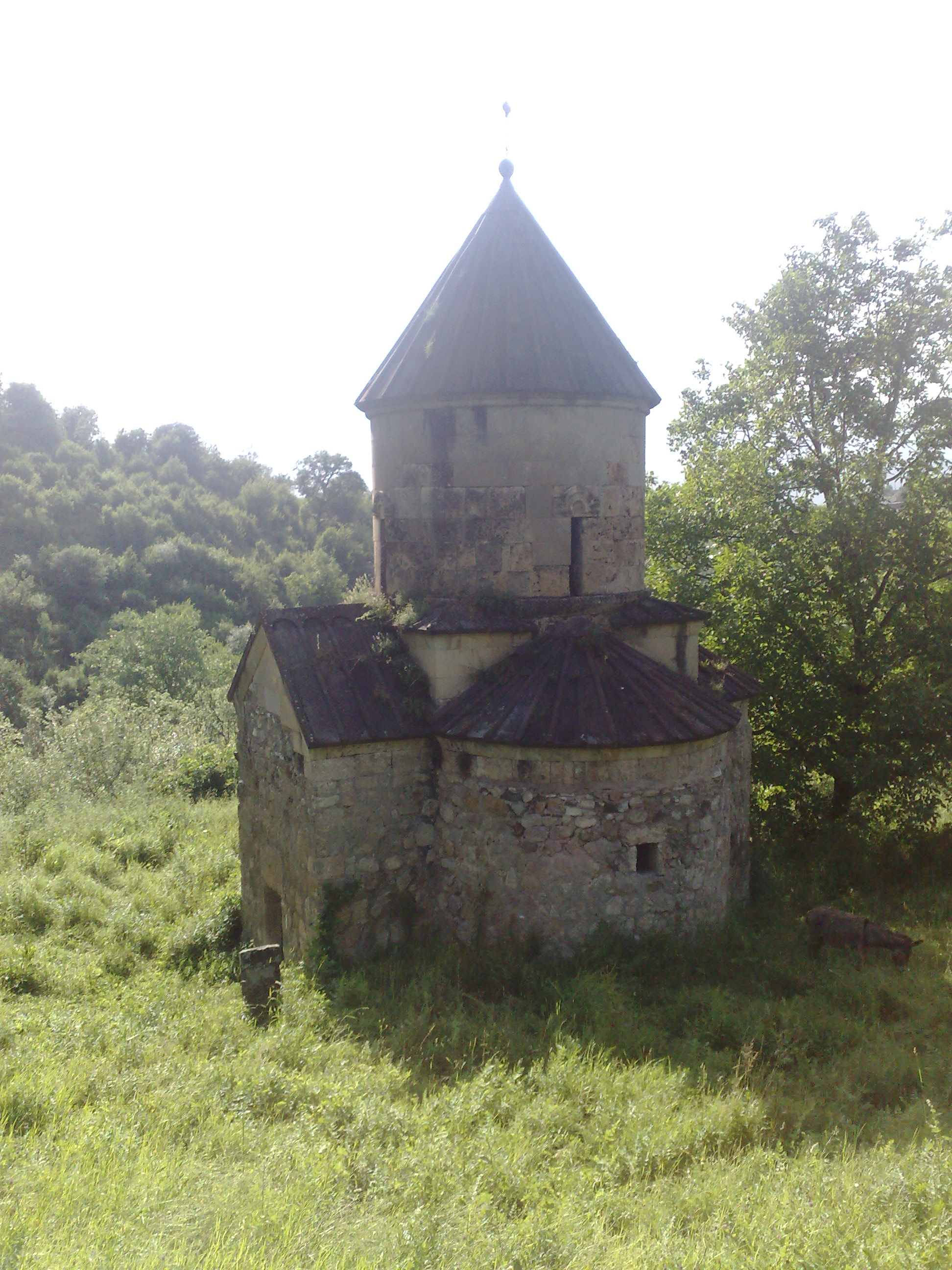
Chapel Trvizi. General preview

== History ==
The chapel dates back to the 5th century. It was reconstructed during the 12th and 13th centuries. An inscription on its walls records that king George III of Georgia (r. 1156–1184) freed the monastery from taxes and endowed it with land. The dome of the Astvatsatsin church was rebuilt in 1213 by Ivane Mkhargrdzeli, atabeg of the Kingdom of Georgia. Nearby is the medieval settlement of Tsrviz, with khachkars.

== Modern condition ==
During the 1980s, the chapel went under renovation works.

== Gallery ==
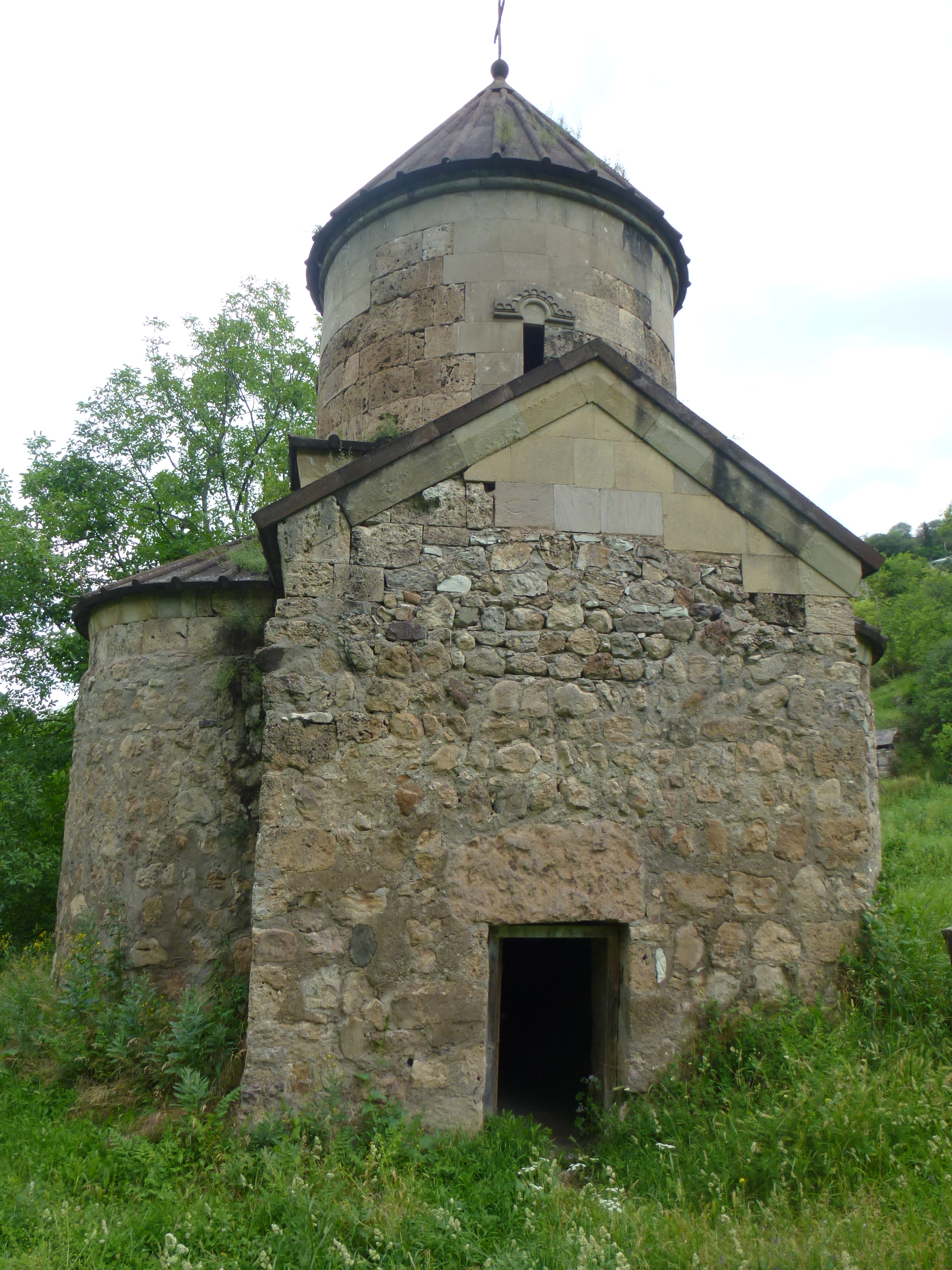

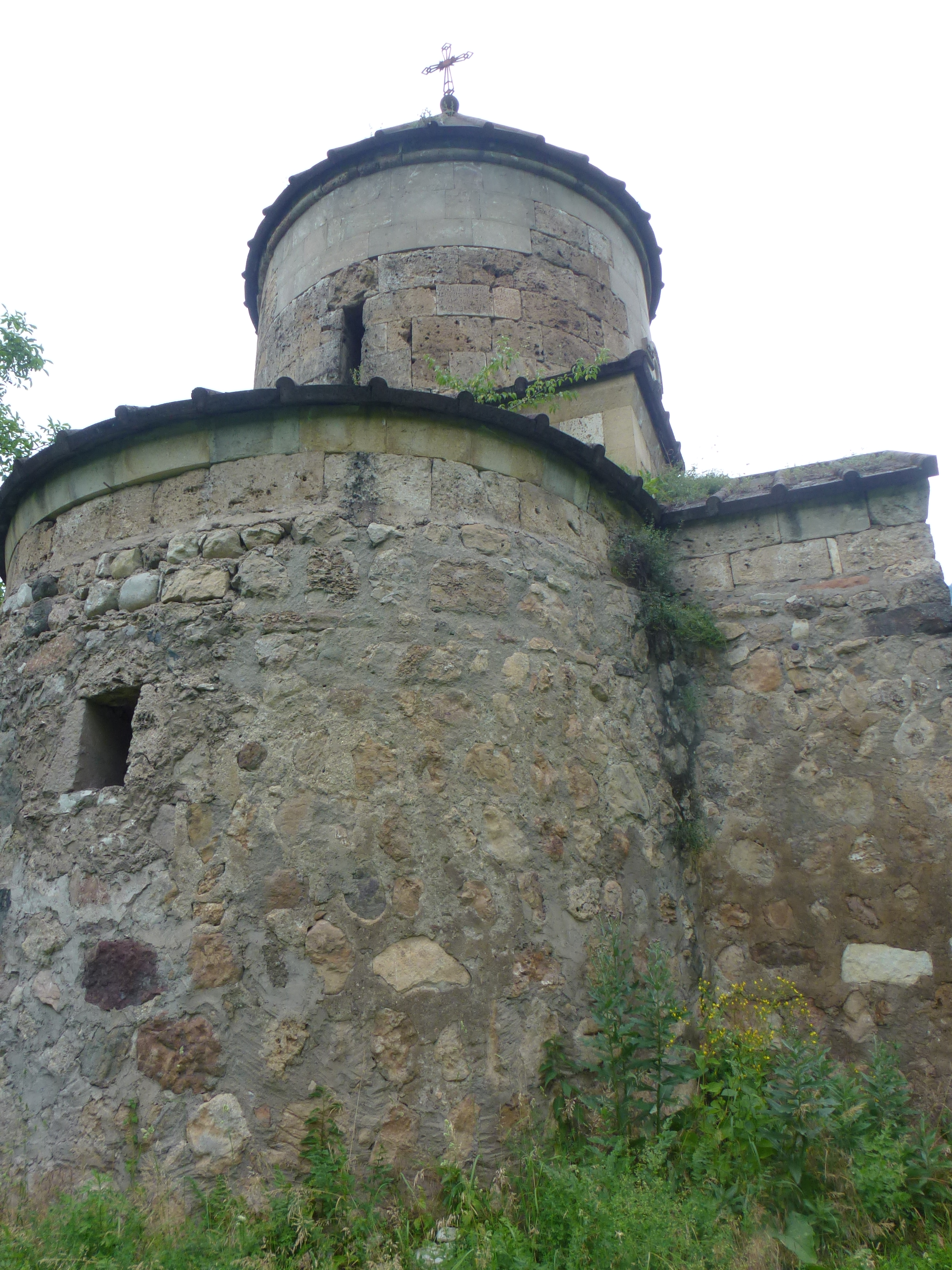

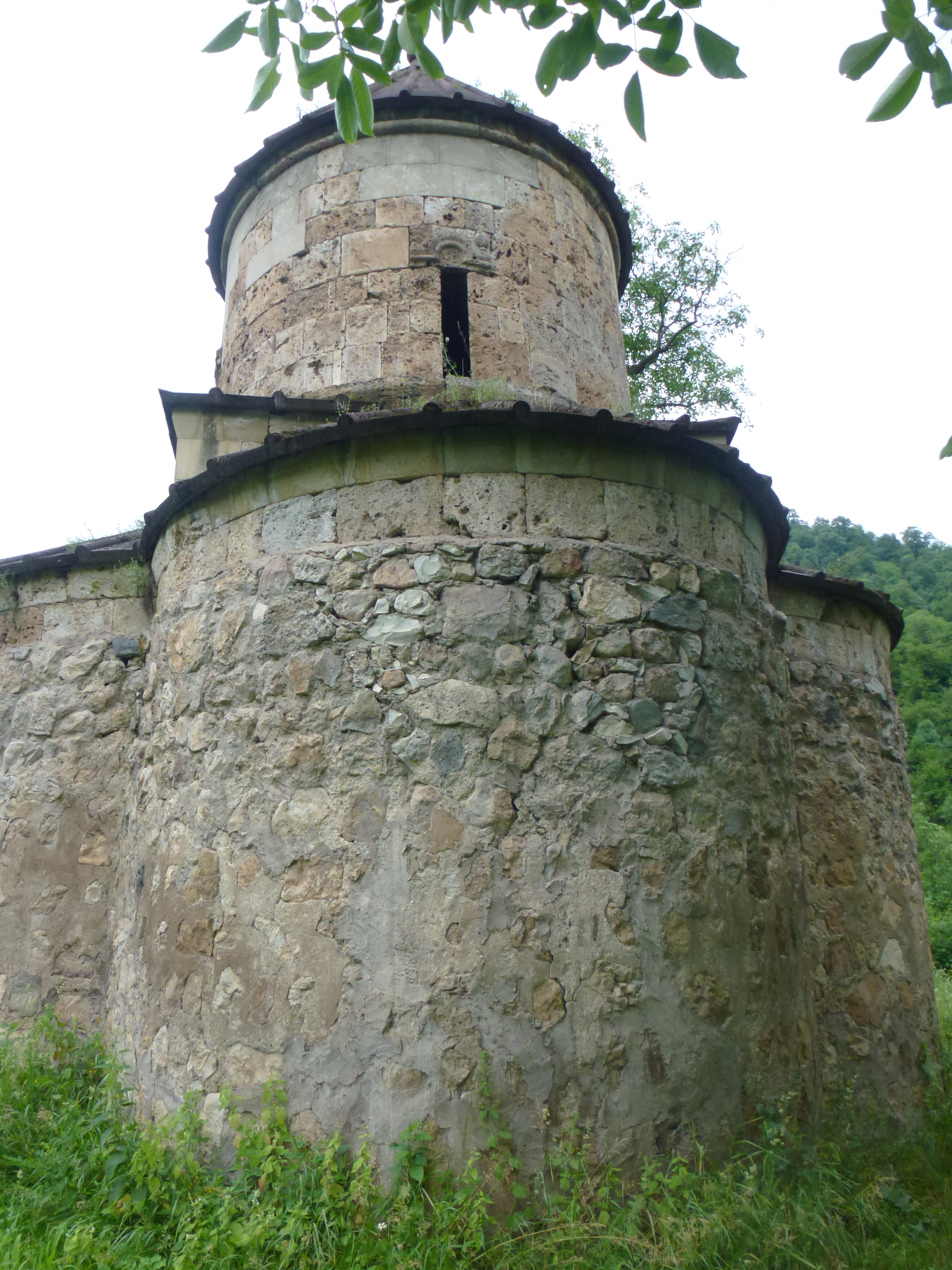

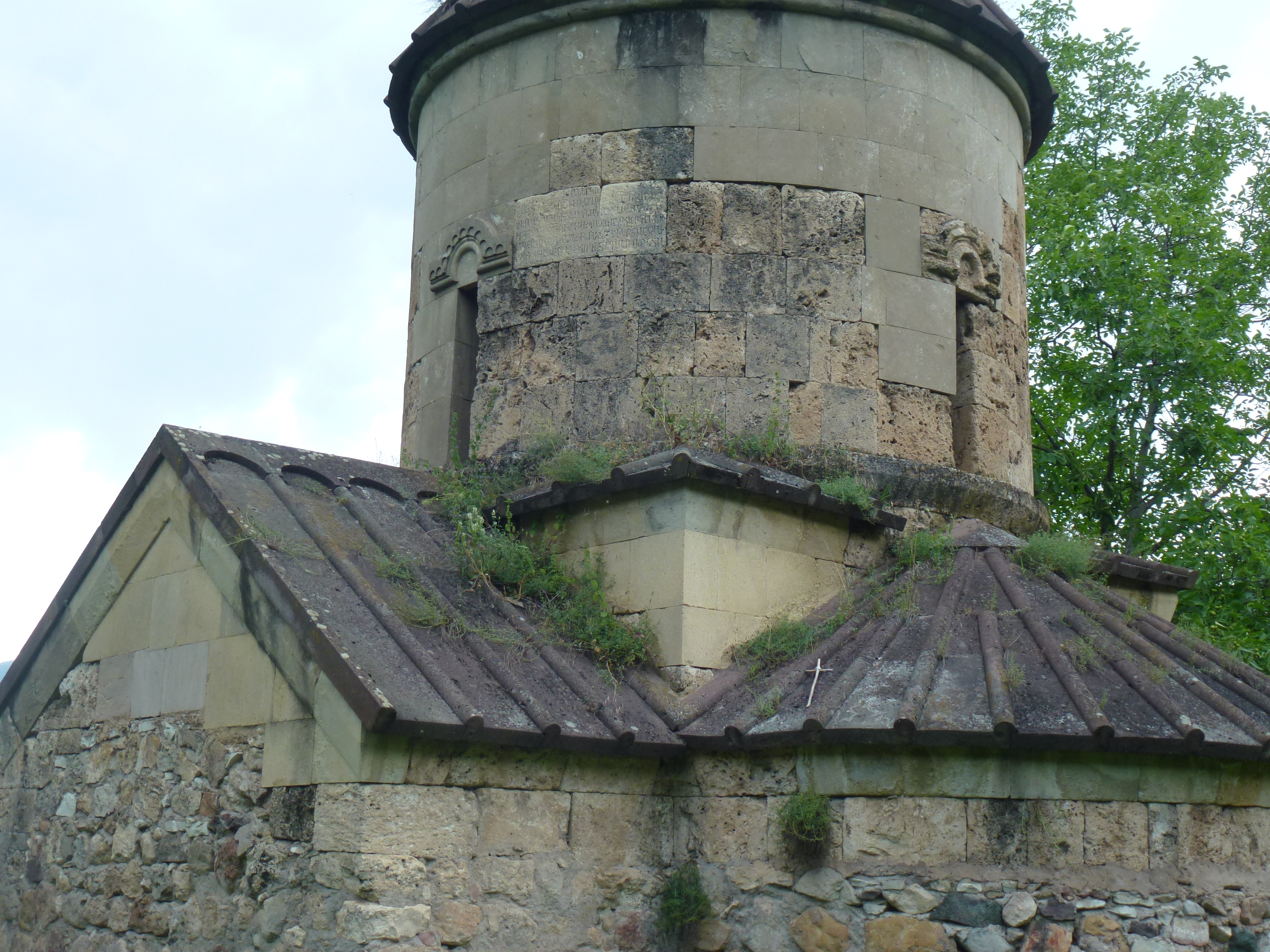

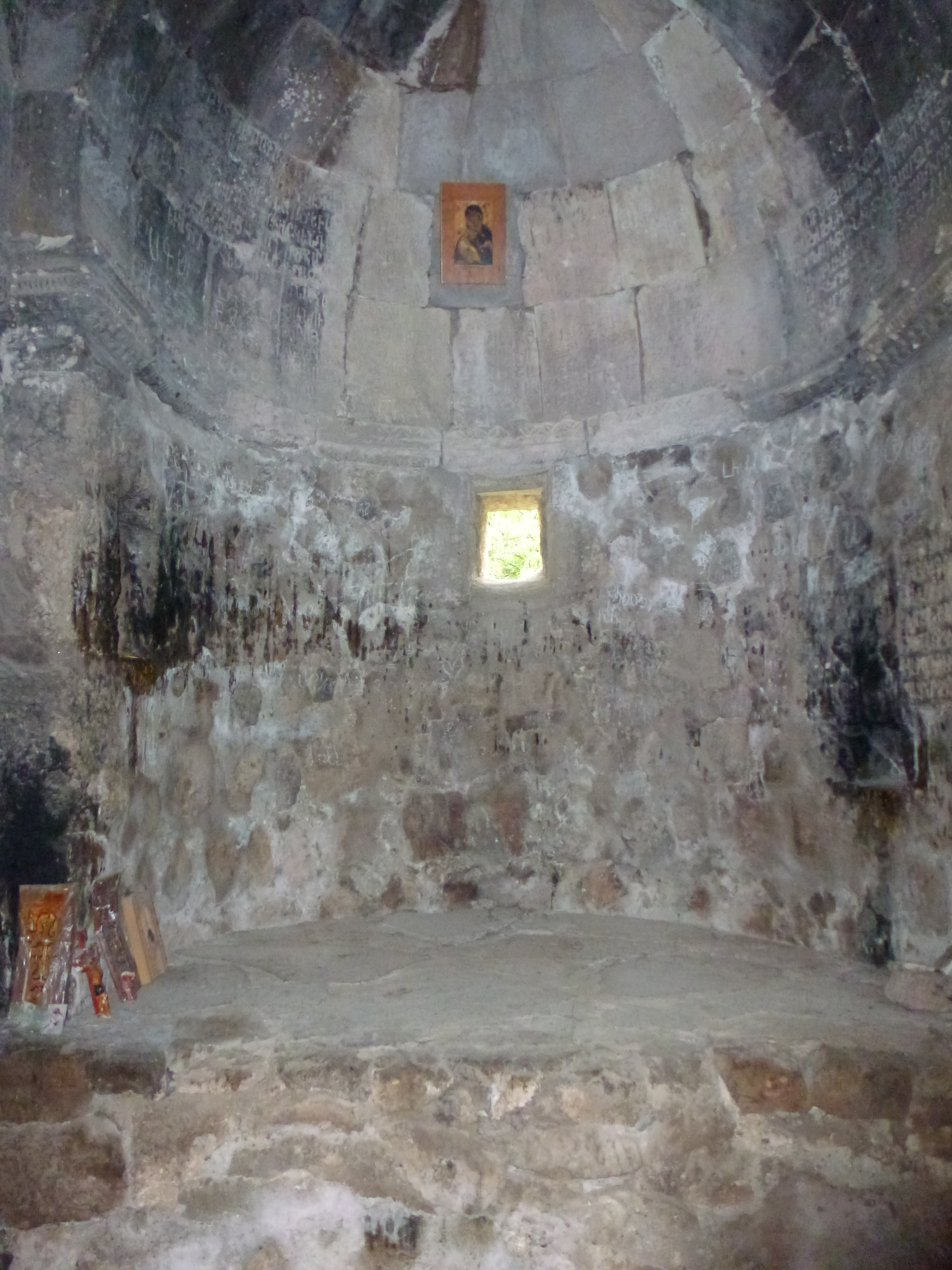

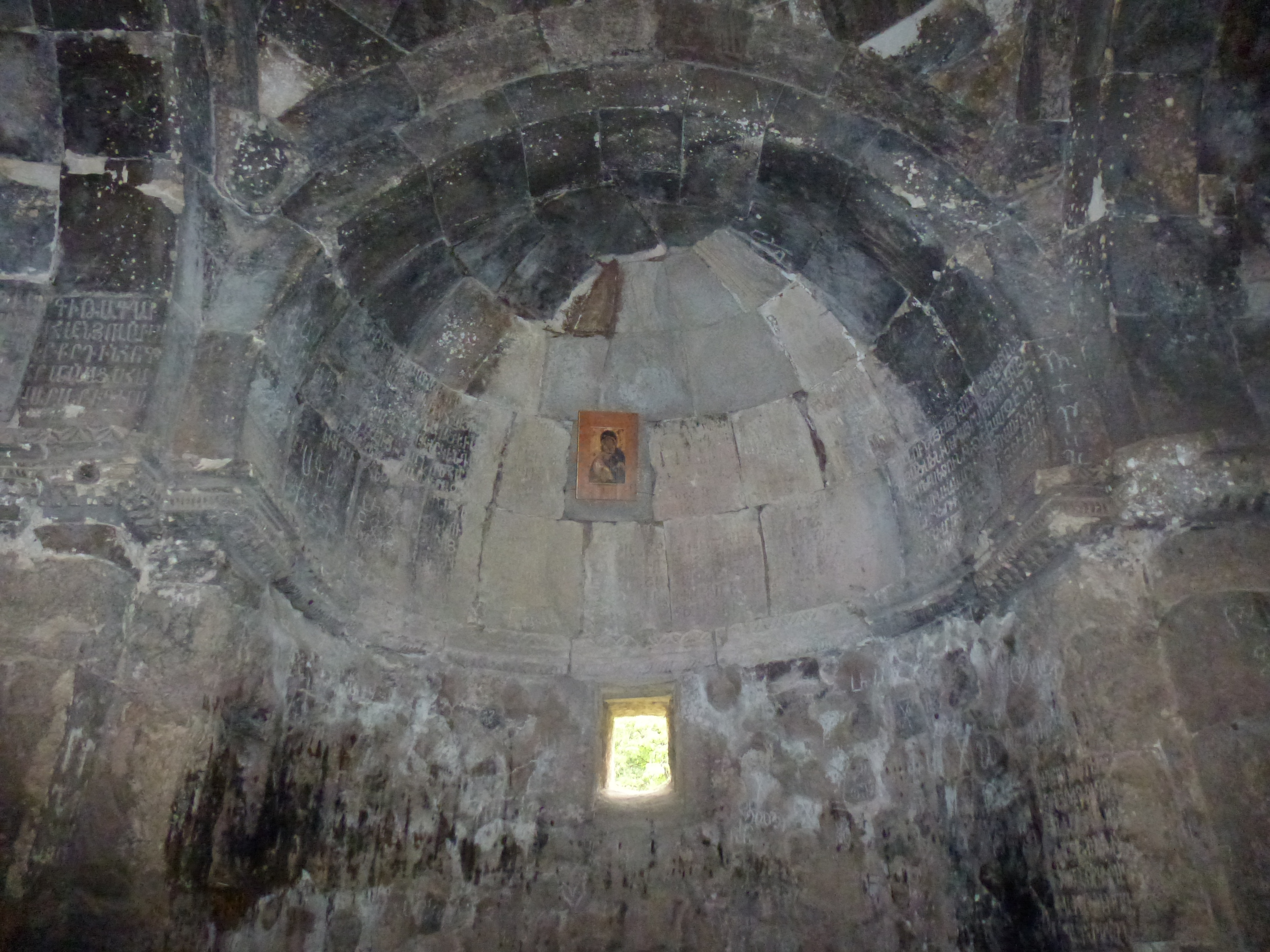

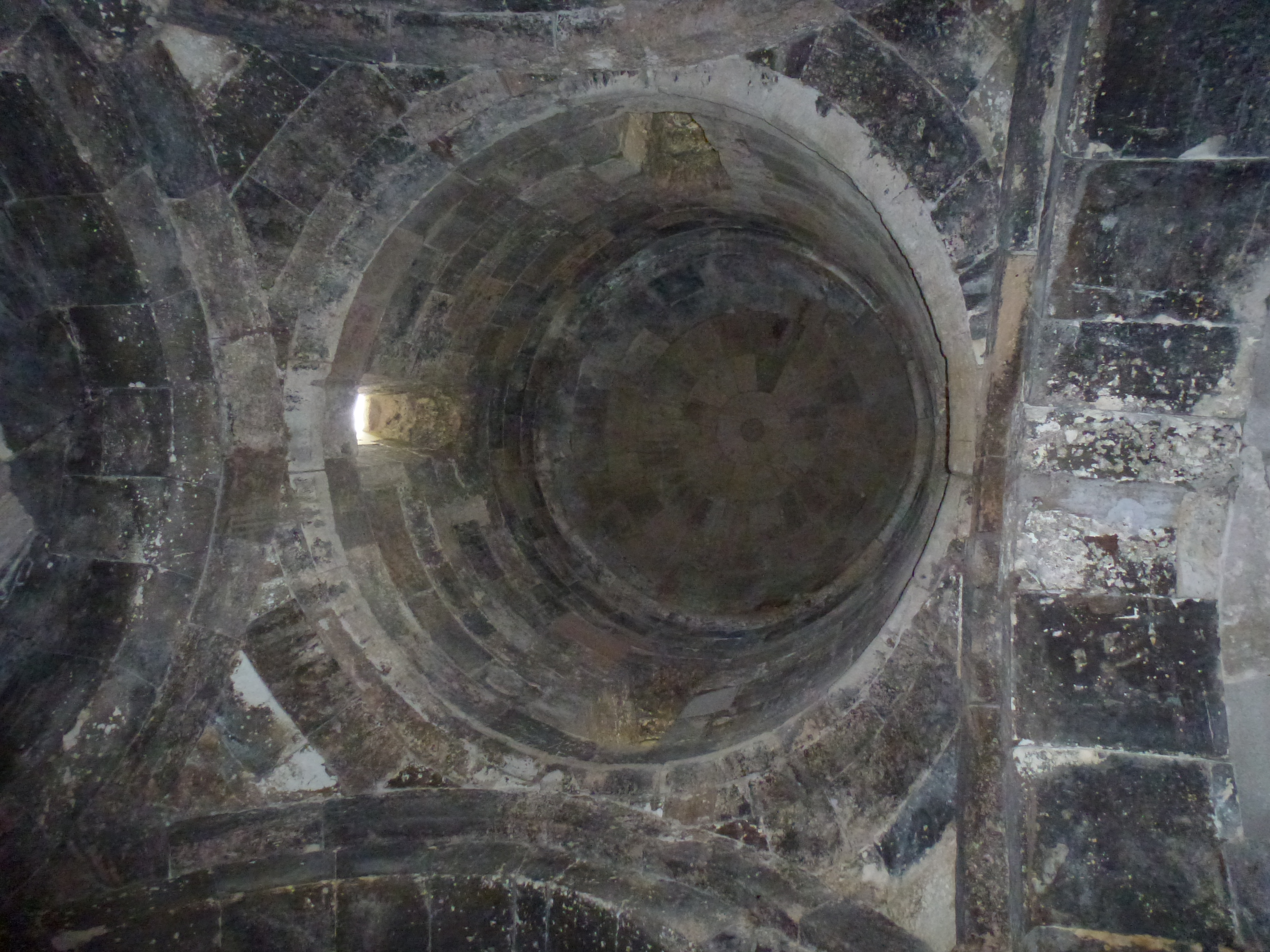

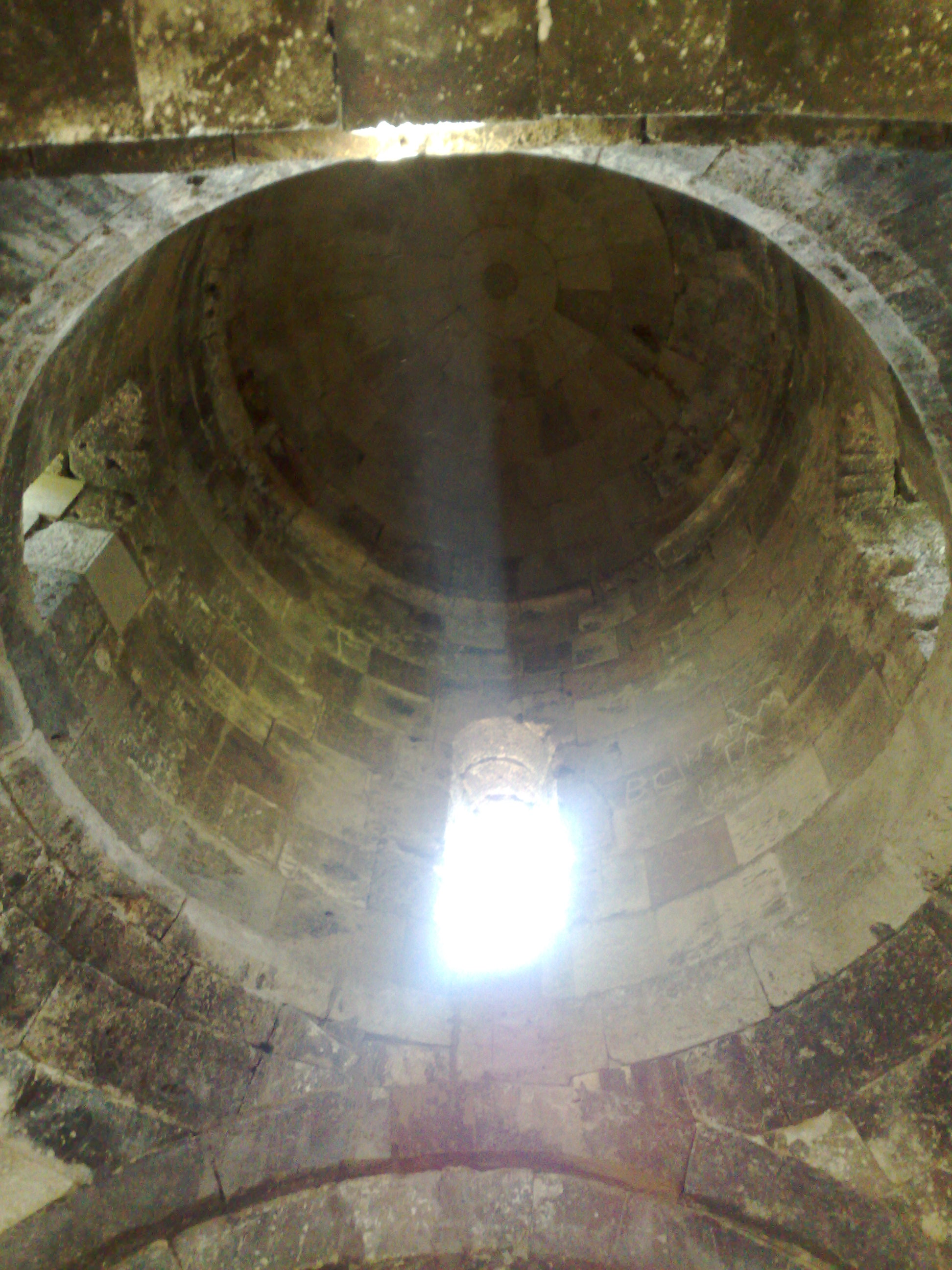
