= Lake Arpi National Park =

National park in Armenia

- IUCN category II (national park)
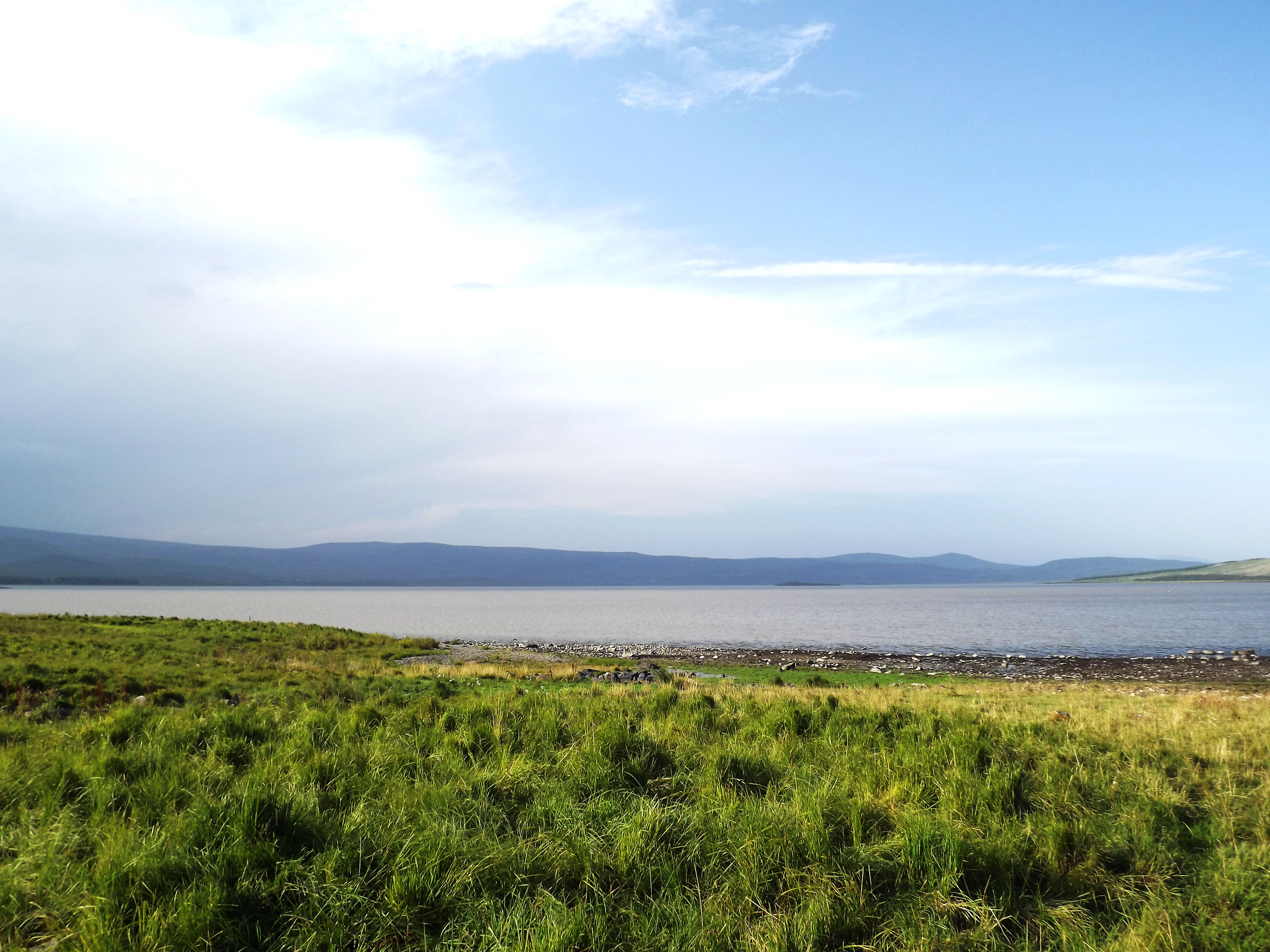

- Location within Armenia
- Interactive map of Lake Arpi National Park
- Location: Shirak Province, Armenia
- Coordinates: 41°03′16″N 43°38′35″E
- Area: 250 km^{2} (97 sq mi)
- Established: 2009
- Governing body: Ministry of Nature Protection, Armenia

Lake Arpi National Park (Armenian: Արփի լճի ազգային պարկ, romanized: Arp'i lchi azgayin park) is one of four protected national parks of Armenia, the others being Kilijan, Sevan and Arevik National Parks. It was formed on 16 April 2009, established by the World Wildlife Fund, with the support of German state bank KfW and the Armenian Ministry of Nature Protection, with a budget of €2.2 million. It is a wetland Ramsar site.

== Description ==
Occupying an area of 21,039.3 hectares (51,989 acres), Lake Arpi National Park lies in northwestern Shirak Province on the Javakheti-Shirak Plateau at altitudes ranging from 2,025 to 3,196 metres (6,644 to 10,486 ft) above sea level. It is divided into the Western, Eastern, Ardenis, Alvar and Akhuryan Gorge sections. Within its boundaries are the namesake Lake Arpi and part of the Ararat salt marshes, an Important Plant Area.

== Flora and fauna ==
Over 190 or over 140 (80-85 nesting) bird species have been reported, including the endangered Dalmatian pelican and Armenian gull. It is an important breeding ground for migratory birds. Other bird species include:

- Eurasian spoonbill
- great white pelican
- ruddy shelduck
- greylag goose
- mountain chiffchaff
- common rosefinch
- northern wheatear
- ortolan bunting
- twite
- booted eagle
- common buzzard
- western marsh harrier
- sparrowhawk
- lesser spotted eagle

There are 255 vertebrate species. Mammals include foxes, hares and Eurasian otters. It is also home to Vipera darevskii, also known as Darevsky's viper.

There are grasslands and shrubs on the lower elevations, with alpine and sub-alpine meadows higher up. There are orchis, gladiolus, iris, poppy and lily. In all, it is home to 670 vascular plant species.

== Climate ==
The climate is harsh. Snow covers the ground up to six months of the year. May through July are the milder months and make up the breeding season for birds.

== See also ==
- List of protected areas of Armenia
