= Jrapi =

Jrapi Ջրափի
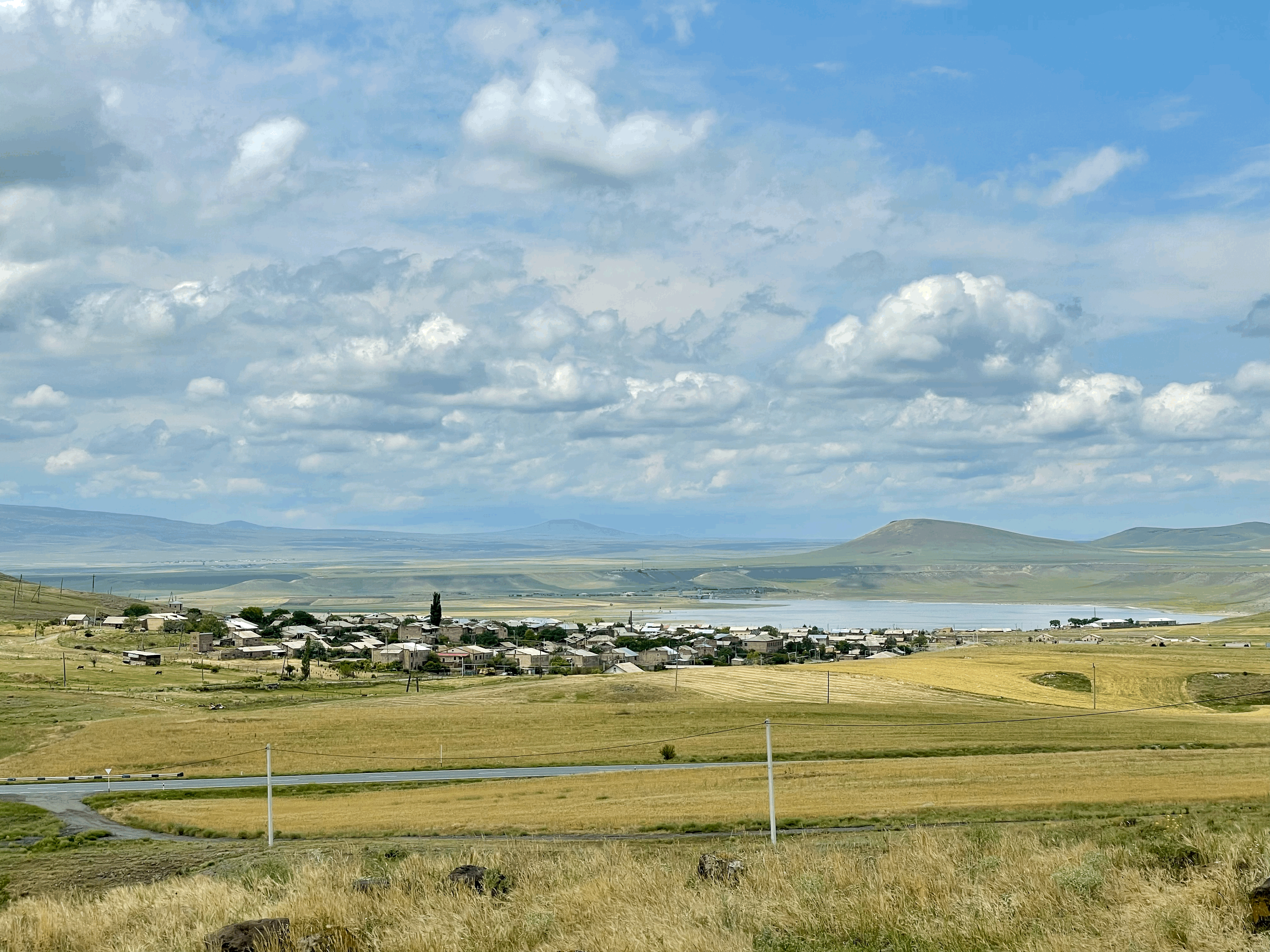

- Location within Armenia Location within Shirak
- Coordinates: 40°33′25″N 43°40′58″E
- Country: Armenia
- Province: Shirak
- Municipality: Ani

Population (2011)
  - Total: 776
- Time zone: UTC+4

Jrapi (Armenian: Ջրափի) is a village in the Ani Municipality of the Shirak Province of Armenia. It was built to replace Nerkin Dzhrapi and Verin Dzhrapi which were to be flooded by the Akhurian Reservoir.

== Demographics ==
Historical population
Year	Pop.	±% p.a.
1989	1,075	—
2001	845	−1.99%
2011	776	−0.85%
