= List of botanical gardens in Armenia =

Botanical gardens in Armenia have collections consisting entirely of Armenia native and endemic species; most have a collection that include plants from around the world. There are botanical gardens and arboreta in all states and territories of Armenia, most are administered by local governments, some are privately owned.

- Yerevan Botanical Garden
- Ijevan Dendropark
- Sevan Botanical Garden
- Stepanavan Dendropark (near Gyulagarak)
