= Astragalus pendulus =

Scientific classification
- Kingdom: Plantae
- Clade: Tracheophytes
- Clade: Angiosperms
- Clade: Eudicots
- Clade: Rosids
- Order: Fabales
- Family: Fabaceae
- Subfamily: Faboideae
- Genus: Astragalus
- Species: A. pendulus

Binomial name
- Astragalus pendulus D.C.

Synonyms
- Astragalus atropurpureus Boiss. & Heldr.; Astragalus campylosema Boiss.; Astragalus coelestis Boiss.; Astragalus feddei Širj.; Astragalus fodinarum Boiss. & Noë ex Bunge; Astragalus hashtrudicus Ranjbar; Astragalus pityusarum Bornm.; Tragacantha atropurpurea (Boiss. & Heldr.) Kuntze; Tragacantha campylosema (Boiss.) Kuntze; Tragacantha coelestis (Boiss.) Kuntze; Tragacantha fodinarum (Boiss. & Noë ex Bunge) Kuntze

Species of legume

Astragalus pendulus, synonym Astragalus coelestis, is a species of milkvetch native to Iran, the Transcaucasus and Turkey.

== Conservation ==
Astragalus coelestis was assessed as "data deficient" in the 2006 IUCN Red List, where it is said to be native only to Armenia, occurring on Mount Bug-Dag in the Sevan area on slopes at about 2,200 m elevation. As of April 2023, A. coelestis was regarded as a synonym of Astragalus pendulus, which has a wider distribution, including Iran and Turkey.
