= Hambardzum Matevosyan =

Armenian politician (born 1992)

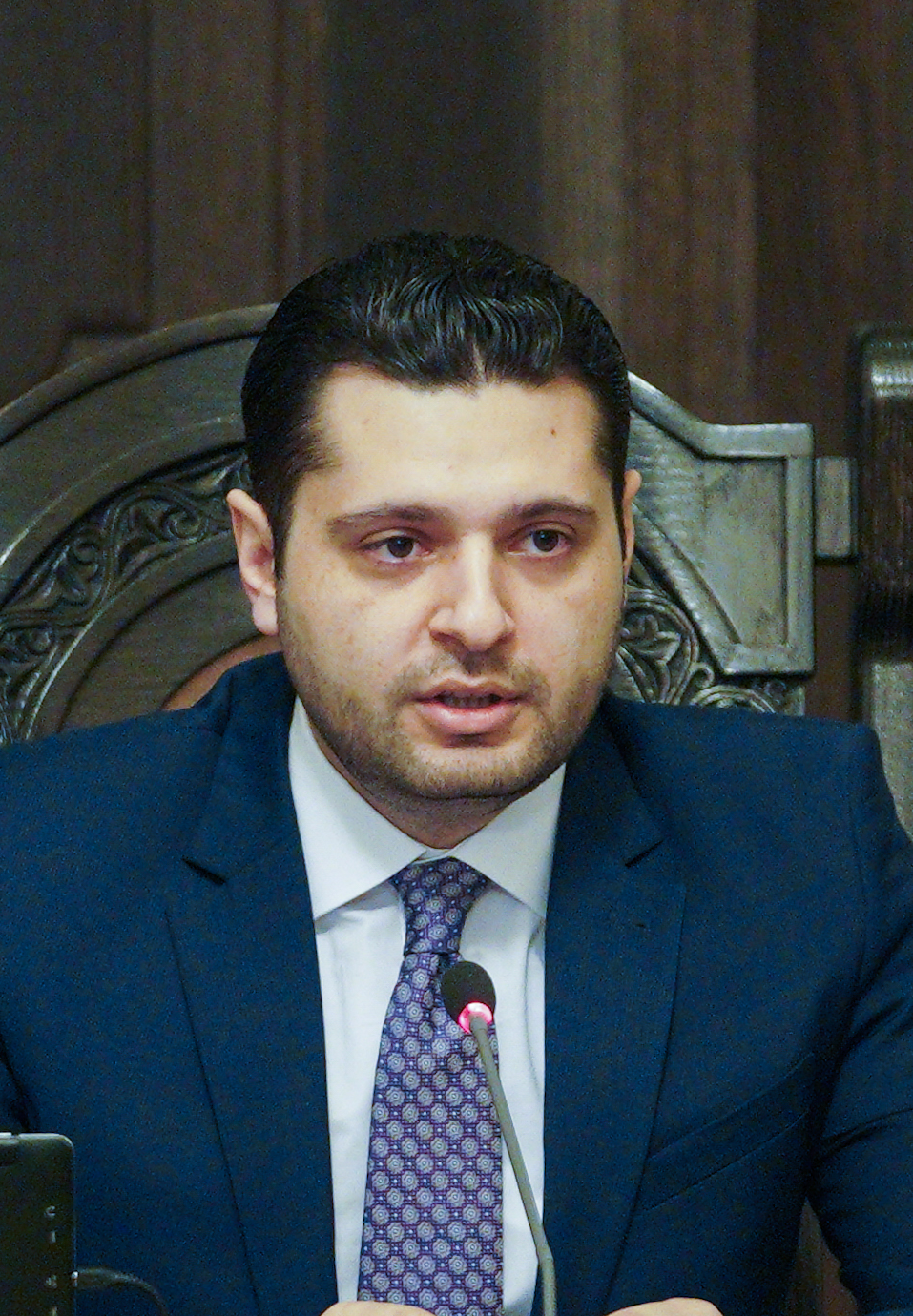
Matevosyan in March 2022

Hambardzum Matevosyan (Armenian: Համբարձում Մաթևոսյան; born on November 18, 1992) is an Armenian politician from the Civil Contract party who is the Minister of Environment of the Republic of Armenia.

== Education ==
He was born on November 18, 1992, in Gyumri. In 2009, he graduated from Gyumri Primary School No. 5. From 2009 to 2012, he studied at the Department of World Sciences at Grossmont College in California. From 2012 to 2015, he studied at the Department of Cooperation, Conflict, and Conflict Studies at the Faculty of International Relations, International Security, and Conflict Resolution at San Diego State University.

== Work activity ==
From 2011 to 2012, he worked at Grossmont College in California as the coordinator of the international student department. From 2012 to 2013, he was the chairman of the Youth Diocese of the Armenian community in San Diego. In 2013, he completed a short-term master's degree at the Faculty of International Relations and Political Science of the American University of Armenia. In 2013–2014, he worked at "Keramresource" LLC in Donetsk, Ukraine as a European market manager. From 2013 to 2015, he worked as an advisor to the Honorary Consul of Armenia in Donetsk, Ukraine. From 2013 to 2015, he was also the co-founder and coordinator of the Armenian Student Organization in San Diego. From 2016 to 2018, he worked at the American University of Armenia as the administrator of the Faculty of Humanities and Social Sciences and as a general education advisor.

On October 16, 2018, by decision of the Government of Armenia, he was appointed Governor of Armavir Region of Armenia. From November 25, 2021, to December 12, 2022, he held the position of Deputy Prime Minister of Armenia. From February 16, 2023, to July 16, 2025, he was the Chief Advisor to the Prime Minister of Armenia Nikol Pashinyan.

On July 16, 2025, upon the recommendation of the prime minister and by presidential decree, he was appointed Minister of Environment of Armenia.

== Awards ==
- Certificate of Appreciation (International Student Center at San Diego State University, 2015)
- Certificate of Appreciation (California State Senator Joel Anderson, 2015)
- "Prevention, Assistance, Rescue" Medal (Minister of Emergency Situations Felix Tsolakyan, 2019)
- Commemorative Medal "95 Years of the Establishment of the Border Guard Unit named after A. Mikoyan" (Armavir Border Guard Unit of the Federal Security Service of the Russian Federation, 2019)

== Family ==
He is married and has two sons.
