= Erebuni State Reserve =

Nature reserve in Yerevan, Armenia

- IUCN category Ia (strict nature reserve)
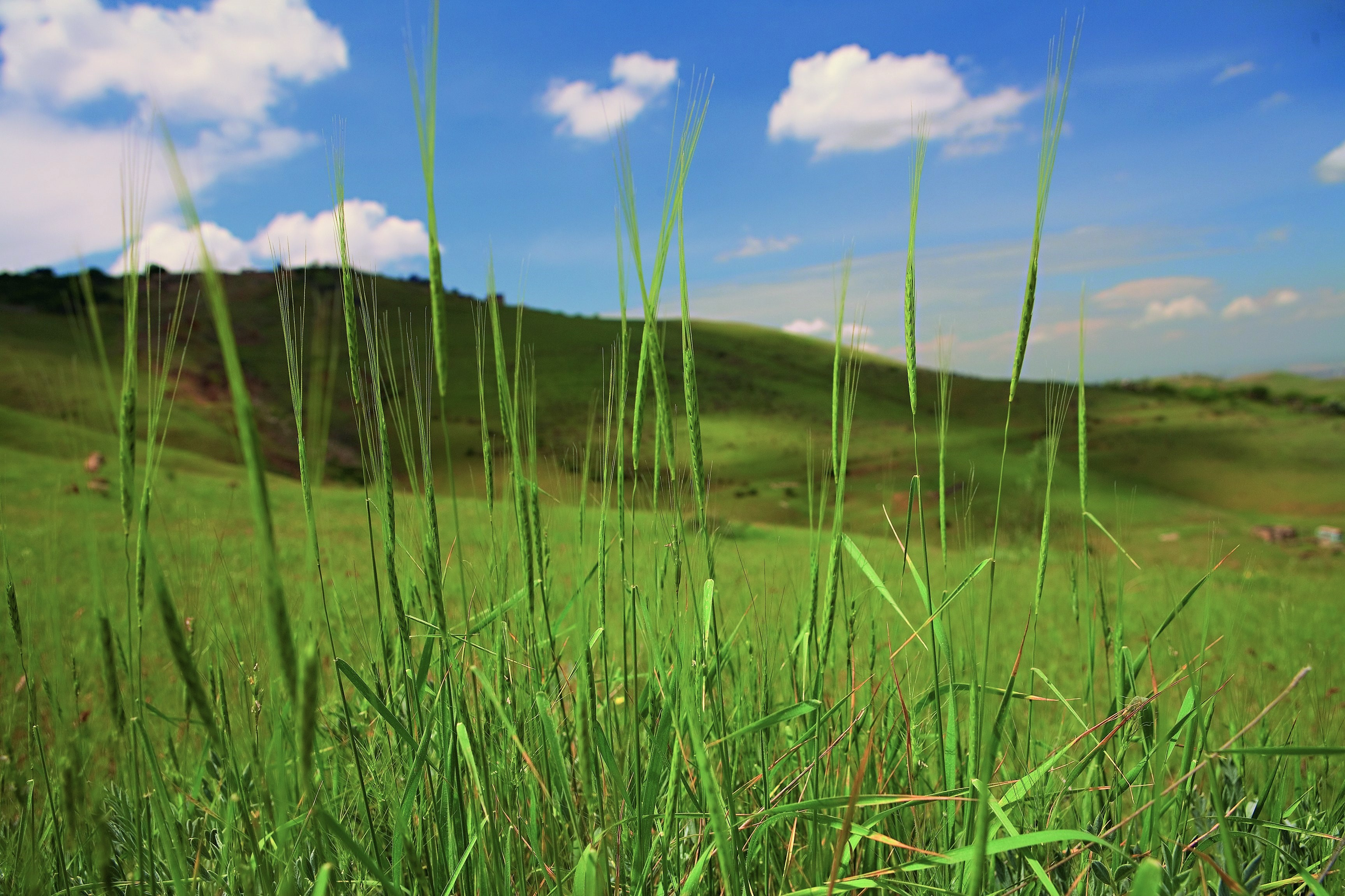
- Wild wheat (Triticum araraticum) at the Erebuni State Reserve

- Location within Armenia
- Location: Armenia
- Nearest city: Yerevan
- Coordinates: 40°09′43″N 44°38′23″E
- Area: 1.18 km^{2} (0.46 sq mi)
- Established: 1981
- Governing body: Ministry of Nature Protection, Armenia

Erebuni State Reserve (Armenian: Էրեբունի պետական արգելոց, romanized: Erebuni petakan argelots'), is a nature reserve in Yerevan, Armenia, designated in 1981. It is located around 8 km southeast of the capital's city-centre, in the Erebuni District. In 2015, the reserve was increased from 89 to 120 hectares, gaining 31 hectares in Voghjaberd. The reserve is mainly semi-deserted mountain-steppe and has an elevation of 1300–1450 meters above sea level.

The reserve was formed to protect the wild types of Poaceae, including the Triticum araraticum. Many of the protected species are included in the Red Book of Armenia.

It also has many other protected and endemic plant species, including Iris iberica subsp. elegantissima.

The reserve is also home to many types of amphibians, including Pelobates syriacus, marsh frog and European green toad. Many types of rodents are also found in the reserve.

== See also ==
- List of protected areas of Armenia
- Geography of Armenia
