= Sevan, Armenia =

City in Gegharkunik, Armenia

Sevan Սեւան
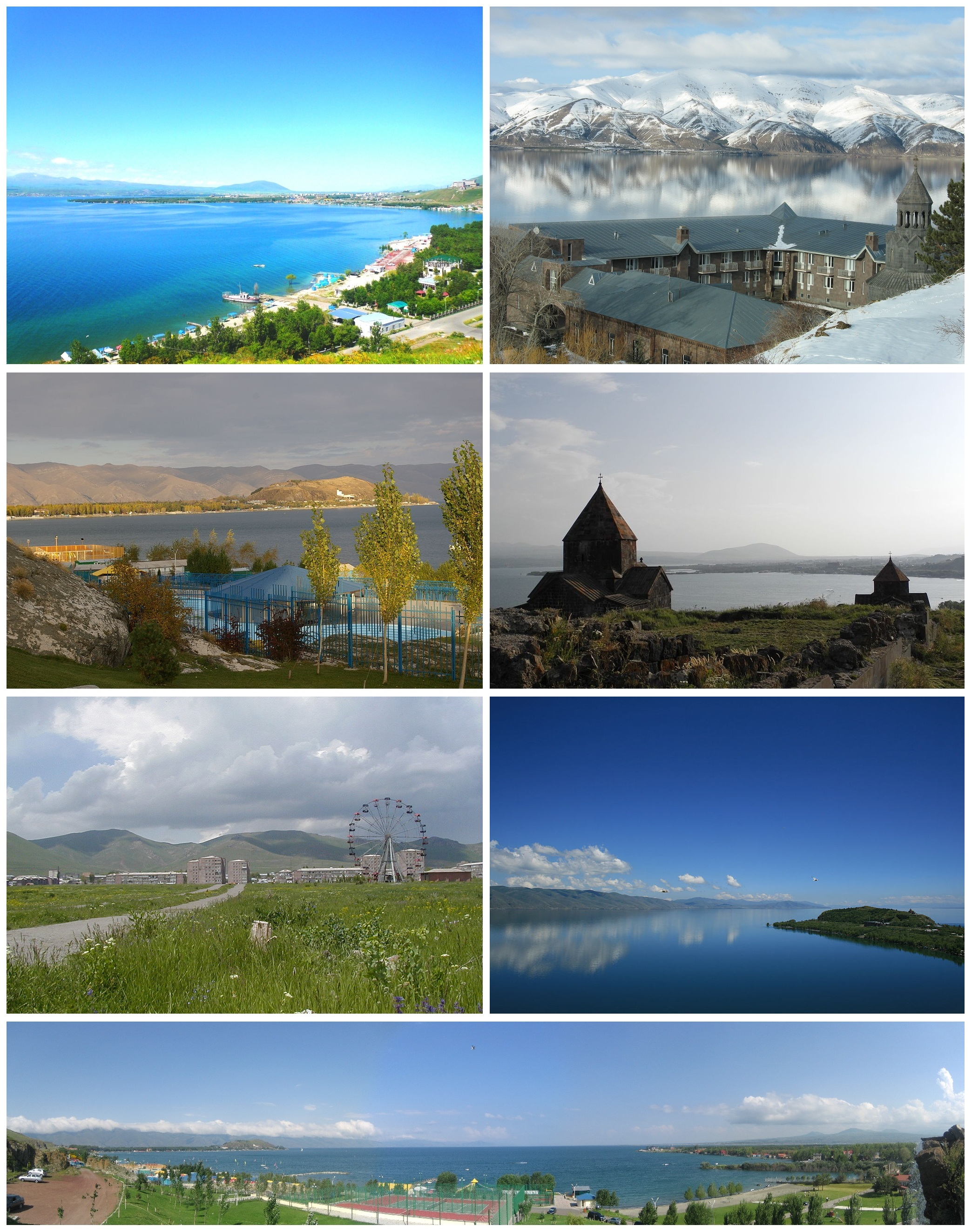
- From top left: Sevan landscape • Vaskenian Theological Academy; Sevan peninsula • Sevan Monastery; Sevan skyline • Lake Sevan; Panoramic view of Sevan beach

- Location within Armenia Location within Gegharkunik
- Coordinates: 40°33′18″N 44°57′13″E
- Country: Armenia
- Province: Gegharkunik
- Municipality: Sevan
- Founded: 1842

Area
  - Total: 17.75 km^{2} (6.85 sq mi)
- Elevation: 1,925 m (6,316 ft)

Population (2022)
  - Total: 18,705
  - Density: 1,054/km^{2} (2,729/sq mi)
- Time zone: UTC+4
- Area code: +374(261)
- Website: Official web

Sevan (Armenian: Սեւան [sɛˈvɑn]) is a city as well as one of the most popular resorts in Armenia, located in the Sevan Municipality of the Gegharkunik Province on the northwestern shores of Lake Sevan. The town is built at a height of more than 1,925 metres (6,316 feet) above sea level, 65 km (40 mi) northeast of the capital Yerevan, and 35 km (22 mi) north of the provincial centre Gavar.

Sevan is surrounded by the Sevan National Park, a natural protected area extending from the northeastern parts of the town to the southwest, while Lake Sevan forms the natural border of the city to the east.

As of the 2011 census, the population of the town was 19,229, and as per the 2016 official estimate, the population of Sevan is 19,200. As of the 2022 census, the population of the town was 18,705.

== Etymology ==
Sevan was founded as Yelenovka (Armenian: Ելենովկա, Russian: Еленовка) in 1842 to become a Russian-populated village. It was named after Yelena Pavlovna the daughter of Tsar Paul I of Russia.

The town was known as Yelenovka until 1935 when it was renamed Sevan after the Lake Sevan. The scholarly consensus is that the word Sevan originated from the Urartian word su(i)n(i)a, usually translated as "lake". The term is found on an 8th-century BC cuneiform inscription by the Urartian king Rusa I, found in Odzaberd, on the southern shore of the lake. Per folk etymology, Sevan is either a combination of sev ("black") + Van (i.e., Lake Van) or sev ("black") and vank’ ("monastery").

== History ==
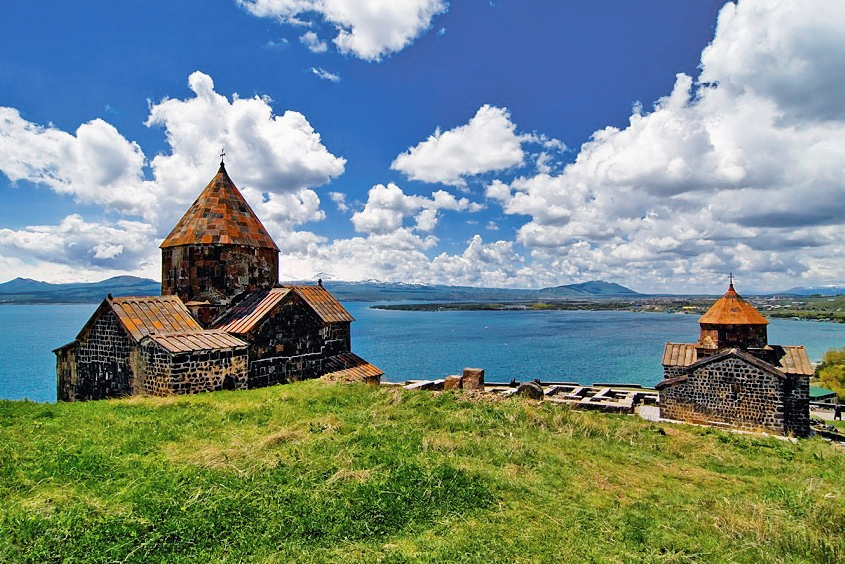
Sevan Monastery

The territory of modern-day Sevan has been populated since the 3rd millennium BC. The cyclopean fortress of Metsep dating back to the 3rd millennium BC stands just north of the city. Another cyclopean fortress known as Mashtotsner is located in the Tsamakaberd neighborhood of Sevan.

After the establishment of the ancient Kingdom of Armenia, the territory of modern-day Sevan was included within the Mazaz and Varazhnunik cantons at the east of the historic Ayrarat province of Armenia Major.

The Sevan peninsula, located 3 kilometres (2 miles) east of present-day Sevan, is home to one of the most notable samples of medieval Armenian architecture, the Sevanavank Monastery of the 9th century. The monastery was mainly intended for monks from Echmiadzin who had sinned. Currently, the monastery consists of two churches: Surp Arakelots (Holy Apostles) and Surp Astvatsatsin (Holy Mother of God). The monastery is famous for its variety of the medieval Armenian Khachkars (cross-stones). Initially the monastery was built at the southern shore of a small island, that later turned into a peninsula during the 1st half of the 20th century, as a result of the artificial draining of Lake Sevan under Joseph Stalin's rule, causing the water level to fall around 20 meters.

Eastern Armenia became part of the Russian Empire in 1828 as a result of the Treaty of Turkmenchay. In 1842, members of Russian Molokan religious sect escaping prosecutions in mainland Russia, arrived in the region and founded the village of Yelenovka. The village remained Russian-populated until the end of the 19th century.

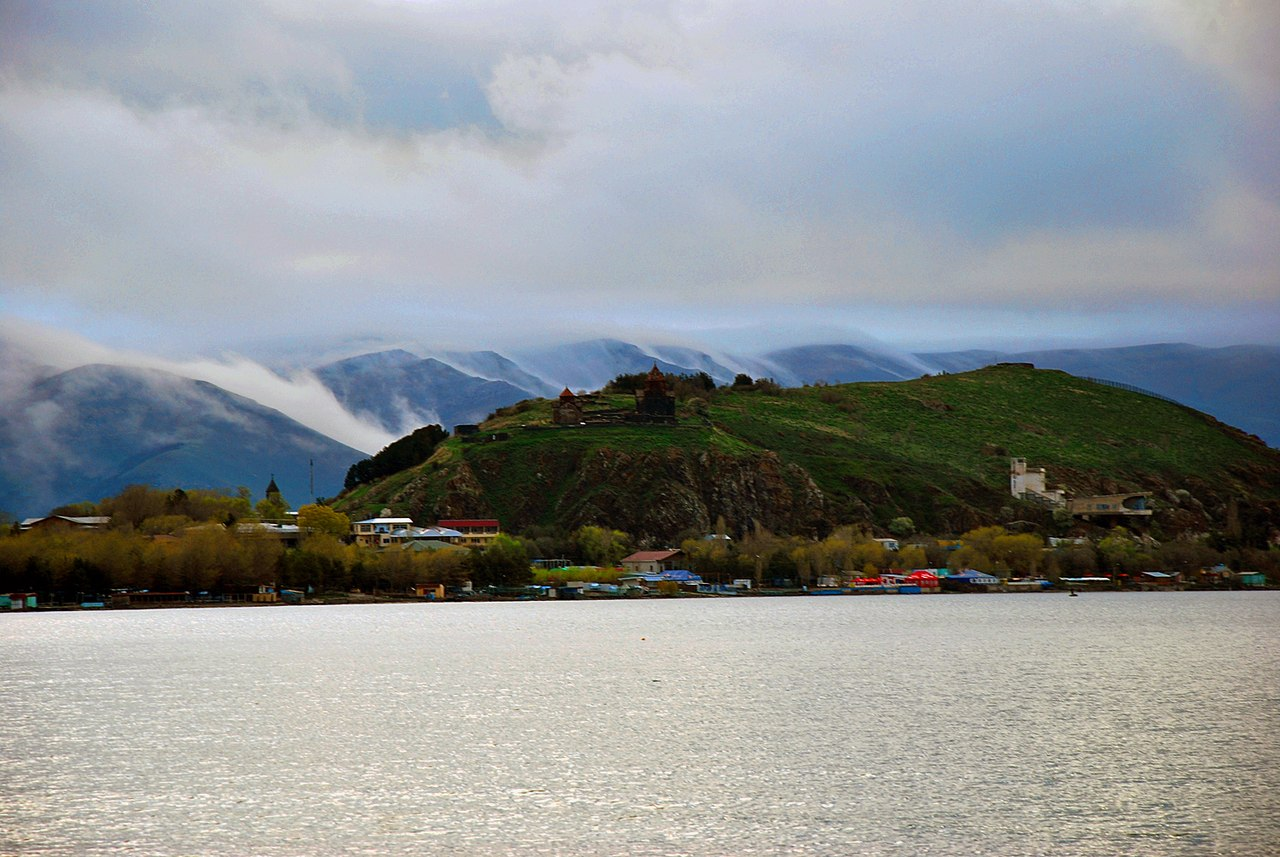
Summer in Sevan

After World War I, Yelenovka was included within independent Armenia from 1918 until its Sovietization in 1920.

In 1930, Yelenovka became the centre of the newly-formed Sevan raion of Soviet Armenia. In 1935, the settlement was renamed Sevan after the nearby lake. In 1961, Sevan was granted the status of an urban settlement. In 1965, the nearby villages of Tsamakaberd and Gomadzor were included within the territory of the town of Sevan. In 1967, Sevan became a town of republican subordination.

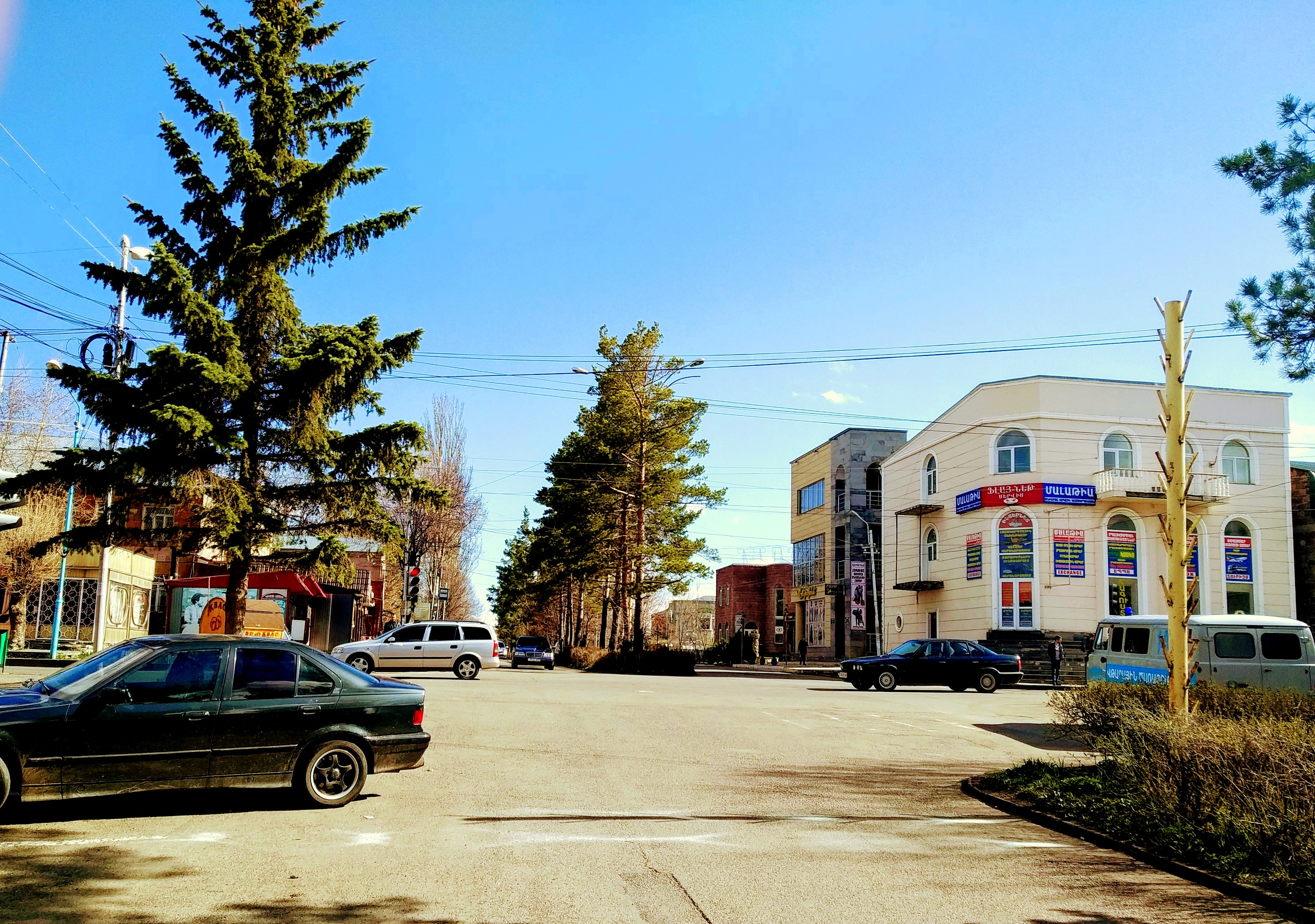
Sayat Nova Street, Sevan

The 1st urban development plan of Sevan was introduced in 1954, with the purpose of accommodating around 11,000 residents in the town until 1970. The 2nd plan introduced in 1967, was envisaged for a population of 20,000 until 1980. However, the new plan of 1974 was designed for a population growth up to 40,000 until 2000.

Under the Soviet rule, Sevan was turned into an important industrial hub within the Armenian SSR. In 1958, the Sevan factory of mechanical devices was opened, followed by the Sevan glass insulators factory in 1962. In 1978, the Sevan flour mill and bakery factory was opened, followed by the fish-processing factory in 1981. Many other small plants for dairy products and building materials were also founded in the town. As a result of the industrial growth, the population of the town has grown 3 times between 1959 and 1979, jumping from 6500 to 20,500.

However, after the independence of Armenia in 1991, most of the development plans were abandoned and the majority of the industrial plants were closed. In 1995, Sevan was included within the newly-formed administrative province of Gegharkunik

In 2004, the Vaskenian Theological Academy of the Mother See of Holy Etchmiadzin was opened in the Sevan peninsula. The peninsula is also home to the summer presidential residence of Armenia.

== Geography and climate ==
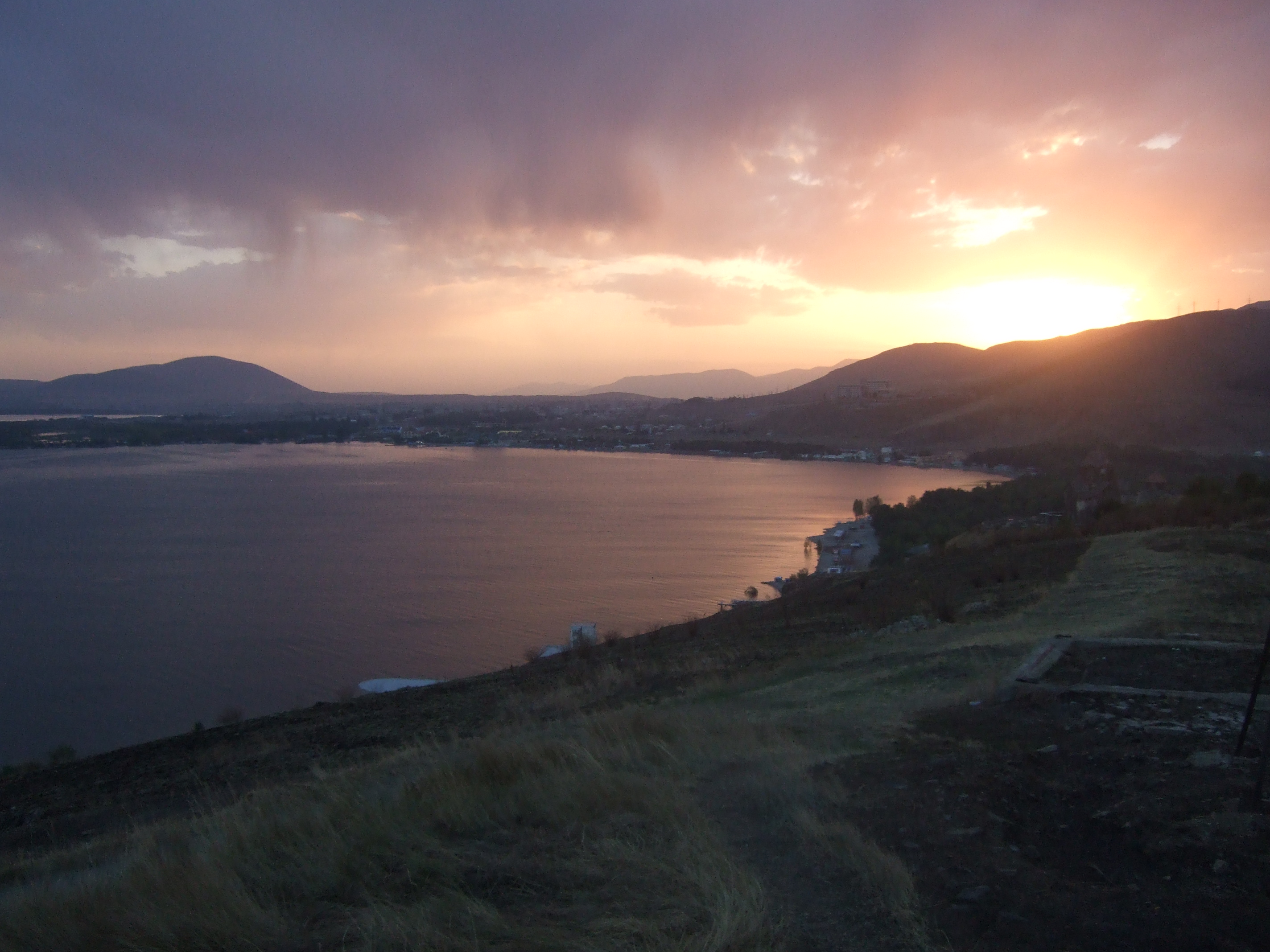
Sunset over the town

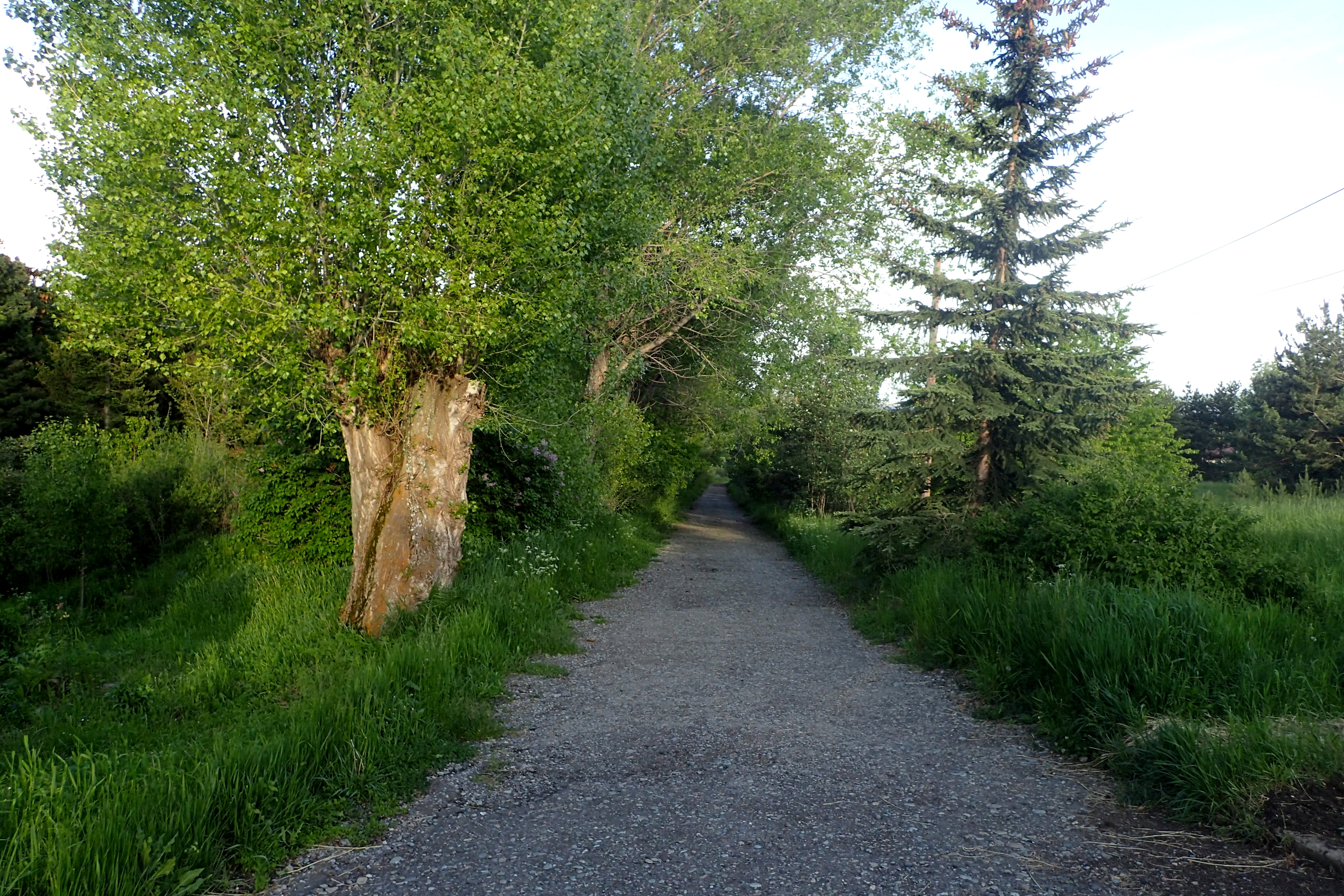
The botanical garden in Sevan

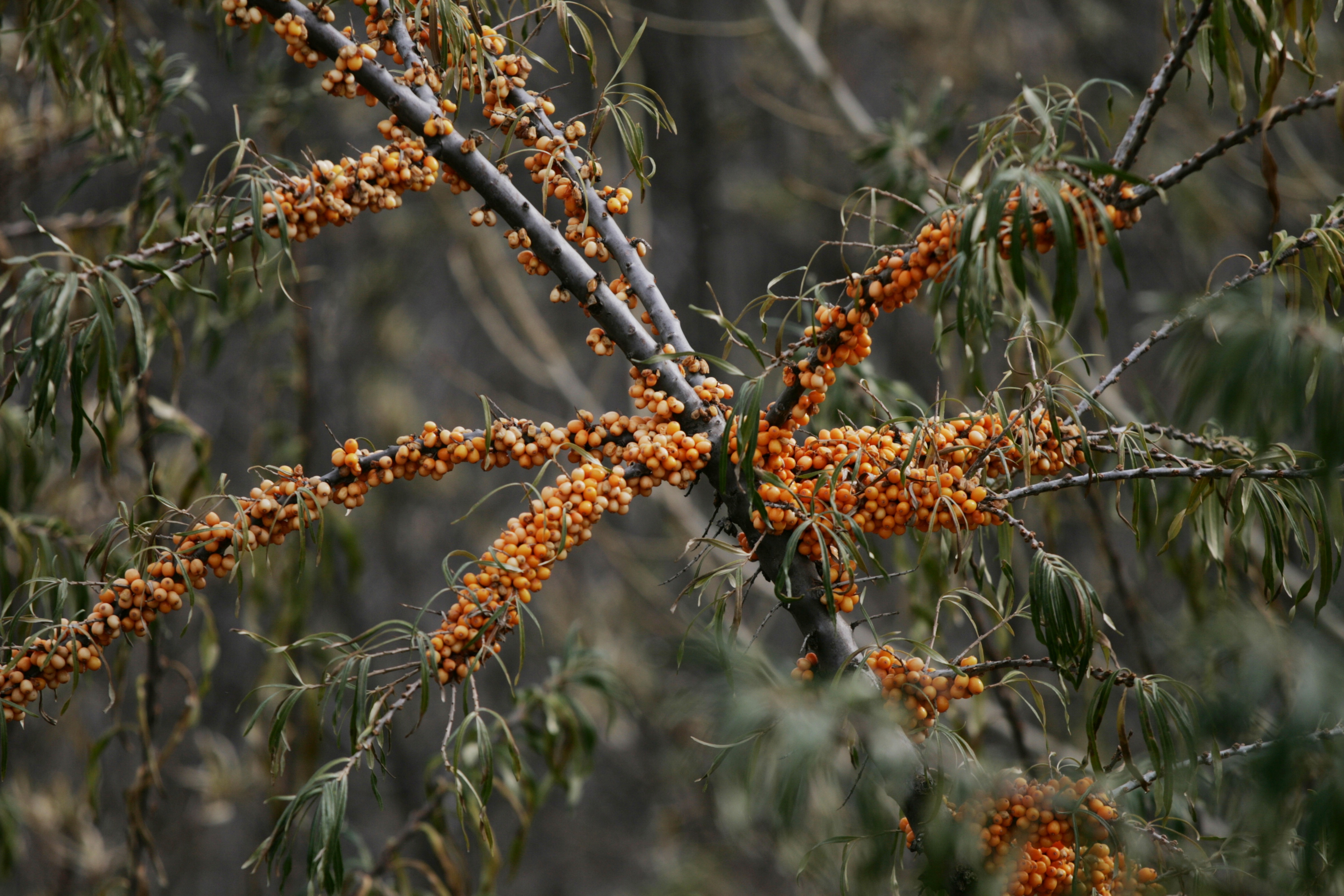
Hippophae rhamnoides at the Sevan Botanical Garden

Located on the northwestern shores of Lake Sevan, the town Sevan is mainly dominated by the mountains of Pambak from the north and Gegham from the west.

=== Sevan National Park ===
Sevan National Park was founded in 1978 to protect the Lake Sevan and the surrounding regions, under the jurisdiction of the Ministry of Nature Protection, managed as a research centre, monitoring the ecosystems and undertakes various conservation measures. Licensed fishing around the lake is also regulated.

The national reserve occupies major territories around the Lake Sevan, extended from the northeastern parts of the town to the southwest. The area comprises 1,501 square kilometres (580 sq mi), of which 24,900 hectares (61,529 acres) are lakeside lands. It is surrounded with the slopes of mountain chains of Areguni, Geghama, Vardenis, Pambak and Sevan. Some 1600 plant and 330 animal species are found here. The park is divided into 3 zones: national reserve, recreation zone and economic use zone.

The basin of Lake Sevan is a crossroad for mesophile and Armenian-Iranian xerophile flora belts.

However, scientific researches about the mammals of the Sevan basin are quite poor. Wolf, jackal, fox, marten and cat, are usually found in the national reserve.

=== Sevan Botanical Garden ===
The Sevan Botanical Garden covering an area of 5 hectares, is located at a height of 2000 meters above sea level and is home to more than 650 local, North American Asian and European species. It is operating since 1944 as a satellite of the Yerevan Botanical Garden under the supervision of the Armenian National Academy of Sciences.

=== Climate ===
The climate of Sevan is classified as a warm-summer humid continental climate (Köppen: Dfb) characterized by short mild summers and long, cold, and snowy winters. Despite its southern location, due to elevation and continentality, the climate of Sevan is similar to Eastern Finland except for seeing about twice as much sunshine.

Climate data for Sevan (1991–2020, extremes 1981–2020)
Month	Jan	Feb	Mar	Apr	May	Jun	Jul	Aug	Sep	Oct	Nov	Dec	Year
Record high °C (°F)	7.7 (45.9)	8.5 (47.3)	17.2 (63.0)	23.8 (74.8)	24.5 (76.1)	30.0 (86.0)	31.9 (89.4)	32.9 (91.2)	30.0 (86.0)	25.6 (78.1)	20.5 (68.9)	13.1 (55.6)	32.9 (91.2)
Mean daily maximum °C (°F)	−2.8 (27.0)	−2.1 (28.2)	1.4 (34.5)	7.1 (44.8)	12.4 (54.3)	16.2 (61.2)	18.9 (66.0)	19.5 (67.1)	16.9 (62.4)	12.4 (54.3)	5.5 (41.9)	−0.1 (31.8)	8.8 (47.8)
Daily mean °C (°F)	−8.0 (17.6)	−7.5 (18.5)	−6.0 (21.2)	0.5 (32.9)	7.0 (44.6)	10.5 (50.9)	14.0 (57.2)	15.0 (59.0)	11.0 (51.8)	6.0 (42.8)	−1.0 (30.2)	−5.5 (22.1)	3.0 (37.4)
Mean daily minimum °C (°F)	−13.0 (8.6)	−13.0 (8.6)	−12.0 (10.4)	−6.0 (21.2)	1.0 (33.8)	5.0 (41.0)	9.0 (48.2)	10.0 (50.0)	5.0 (41.0)	0.0 (32.0)	−7.0 (19.4)	−11.0 (12.2)	−2.7 (27.2)
Record low °C (°F)	−18.5 (−1.3)	−26.2 (−15.2)	−26.8 (−16.2)	−14.3 (6.3)	−4.1 (24.6)	2.0 (35.6)	3.3 (37.9)	5.9 (42.6)	−0.4 (31.3)	−5.4 (22.3)	−12.9 (8.8)	−16.6 (2.1)	−26.8 (−16.2)
Average precipitation mm (inches)	20.9 (0.82)	27.2 (1.07)	46.5 (1.83)	71.5 (2.81)	92.7 (3.65)	81.7 (3.22)	64.4 (2.54)	39.4 (1.55)	38.0 (1.50)	47.7 (1.88)	34.1 (1.34)	20.0 (0.79)	584.1 (23)
Average precipitation days (≥ 1 mm)	4.6	5.8	8.3	12.4	15	11.7	8	6.4	5.6	7.4	5.9	4.8	95.9
Average relative humidity (%)	73.6	73.5	72	71.7	72.4	73	74	72	71.7	69.9	70.2	73.4	72.3
Mean monthly sunshine hours	149.4	154.1	189.2	197.4	252.7	304.5	330.4	315.6	273.9	216	170.1	144	2,697.3
Source 1: NCEI
Source 2: World Meteorological Organization

== Demographics ==
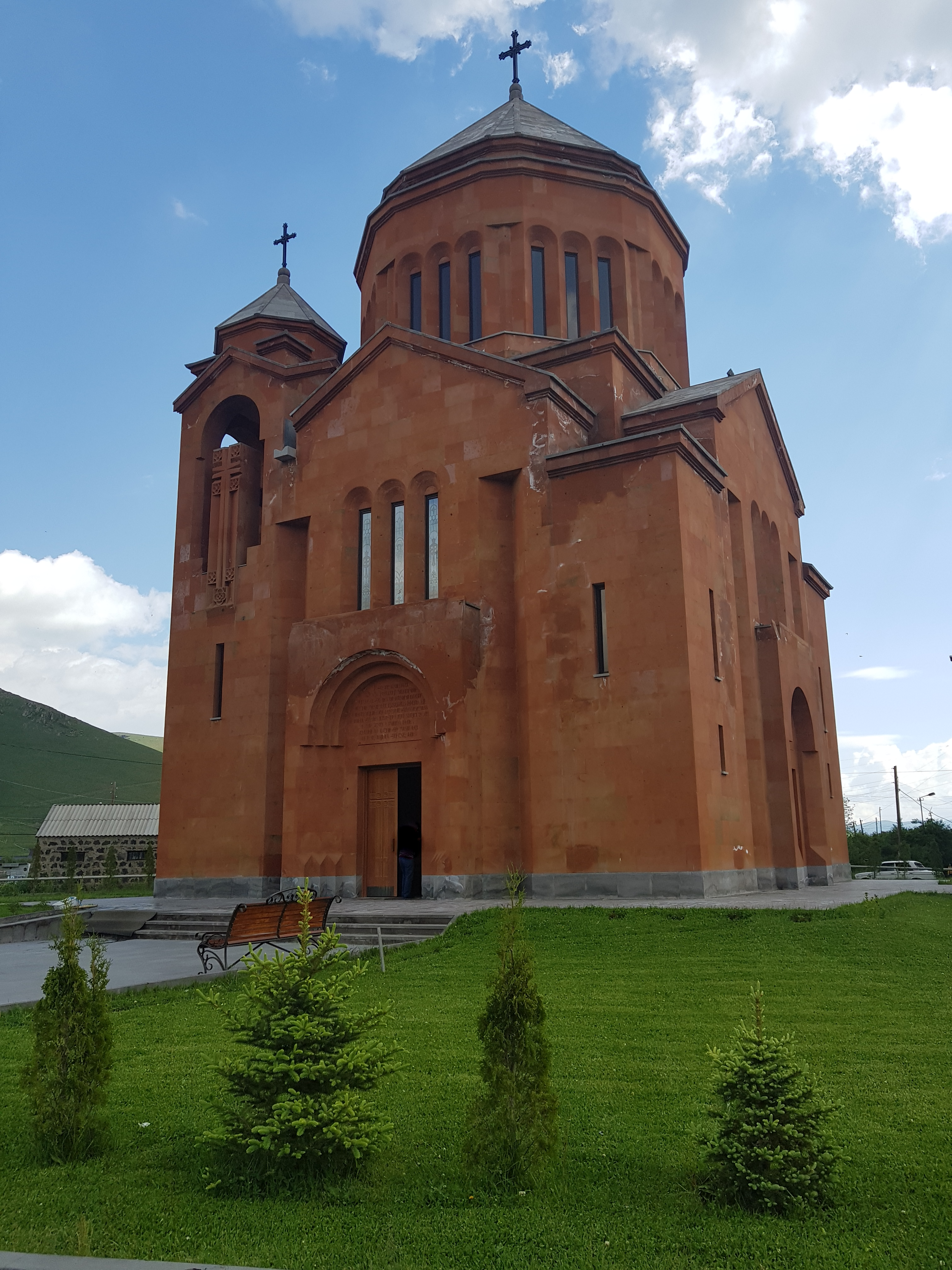
Church of the Holy Archangels

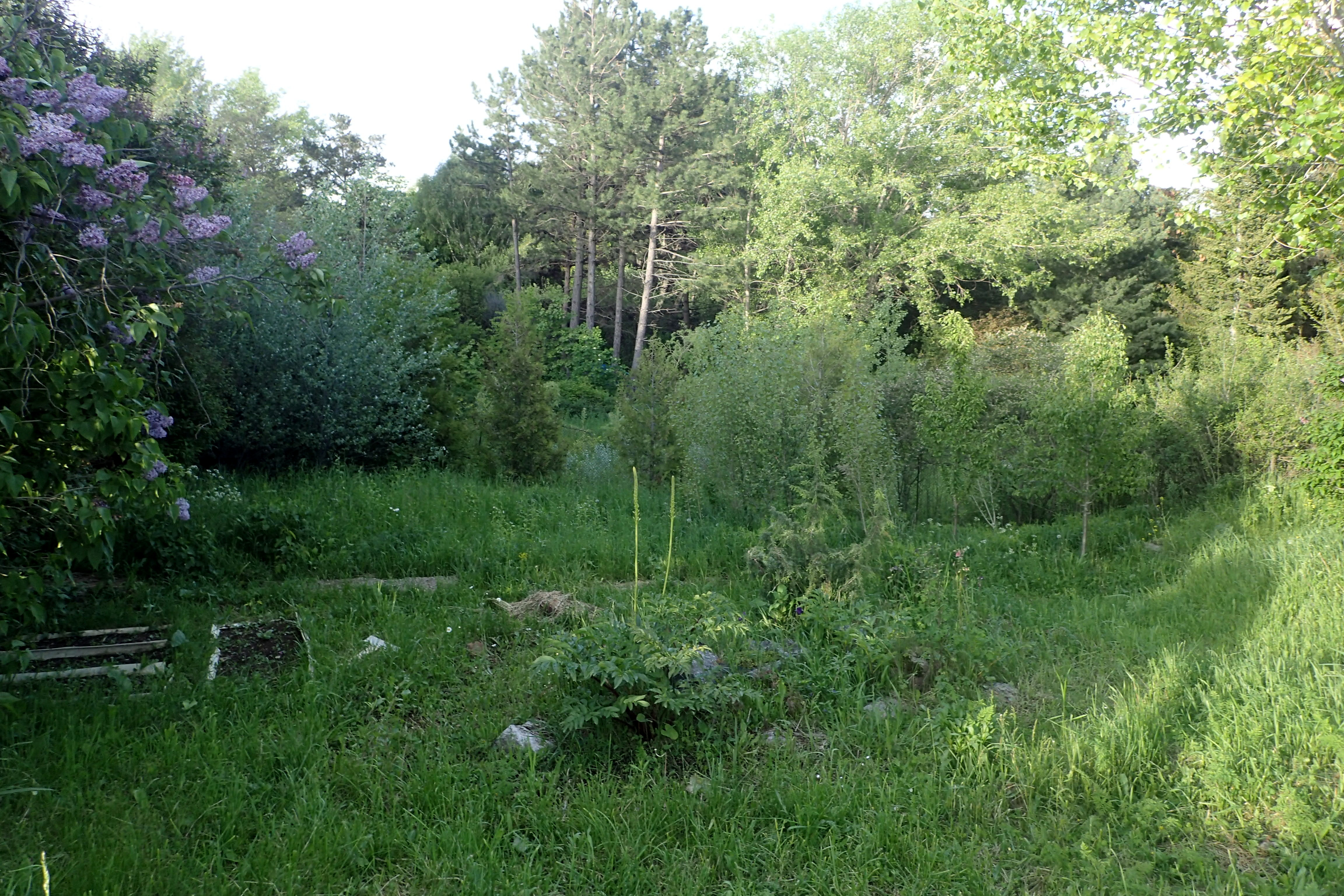
Sevan Botanical Garden

Historical population
Year	Pop.	±% p.a.
1873	944	—
1897	1,371	+1.57%
1926	1,032	−0.97%
1939	2,668	+7.58%
1959	6,415	+4.48%
1970	20,663	+11.22%
1979	26,951	+3.00%
2001	21,422	−1.04%
2011	19,229	−1.07%
2022	18,705	−0.25%

=== Religion ===
The majority of the population of Sevan belongs to the Armenian Apostolic Church. The church of the Holy Archangels is the main church of the town. It was consecrated on 31 May 2015. The town also has a Jewish community of Subbotniks, and the only town in Armenia with a Synagogue outside of Yerevan.

== Culture ==
The town is home to cultural palace and many public libraries. Sevan is also home to geological museum that operates on the basis of the Sevan Botanical Garden.

Sevan is home to 2 regional TV stations:

- "Sevan TV" (STV 1) operating since 1999,
- "Geghama TV" operating since 2010.

== Transportation ==
Sevan is located on the M-4 Motorway that connects the capital Yerevan eastern and northeastern Armenia.

The town has also a railway station that connects Sevan with Yerevan through seasonal trips. Regular daily trips of buses and minibuses also connect the town with Yerevan and other provinces.

== Economy ==
=== Industry ===
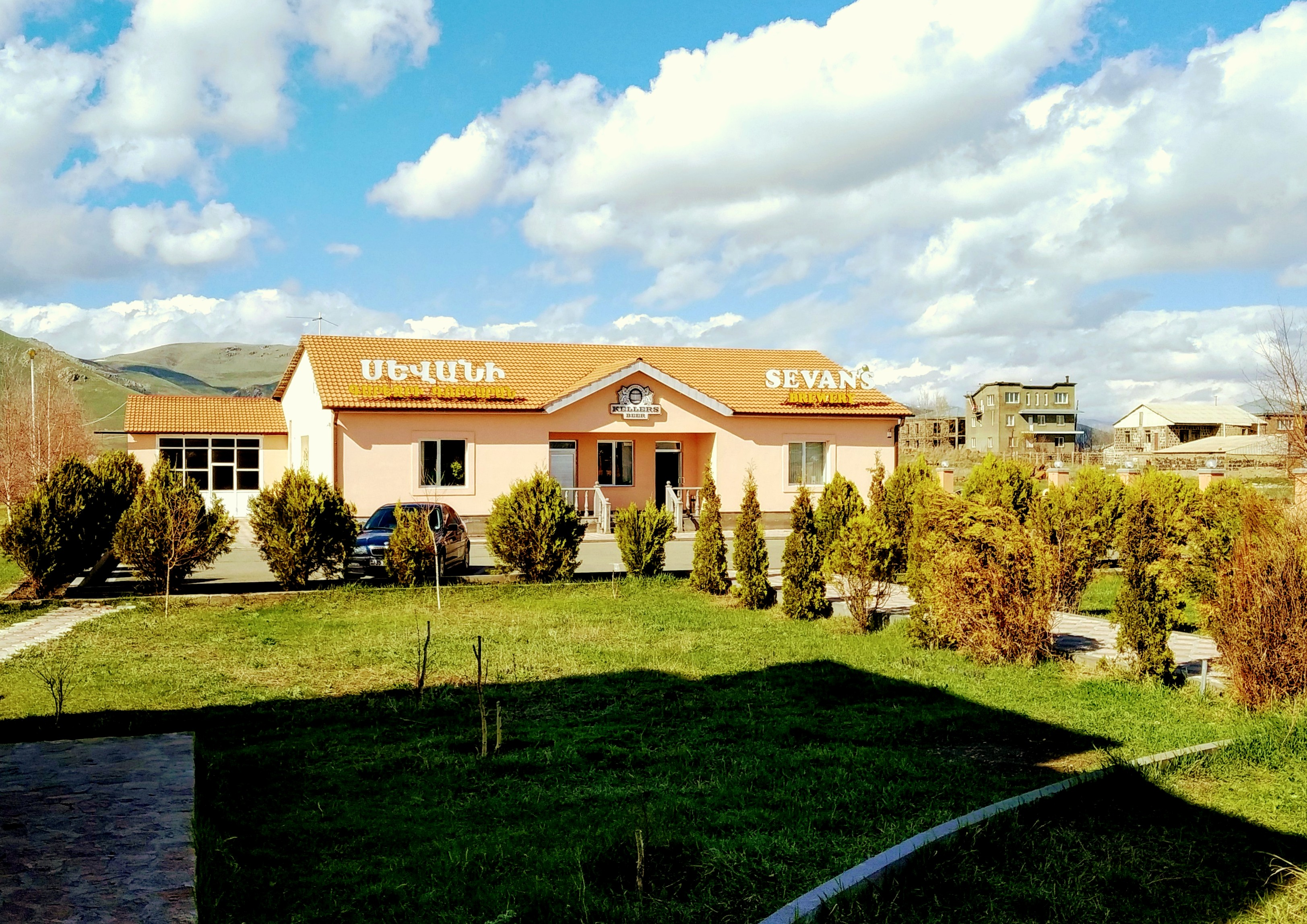
Lihnitis Sevan Brewery

The vast majority of the Soviet-era industrial plants of Sevan are currently abandoned. The Sevan flour mill and bakery factory is the only major plant that survived after the independence.

Currently, the town is also home to the Sevan sugar plant opened in 2003, and the Lihnitis Sevan Brewerey opened in 2007. The Sevan Brewery produces a variety of lager beer as well as dunkel beer, under the brand Kellers.

"Yerknain Manana" confectionery plant (2013) and the "Tuff-Granite" mining plant are also among the notable firms of Sevan.

=== Tourism and services ===
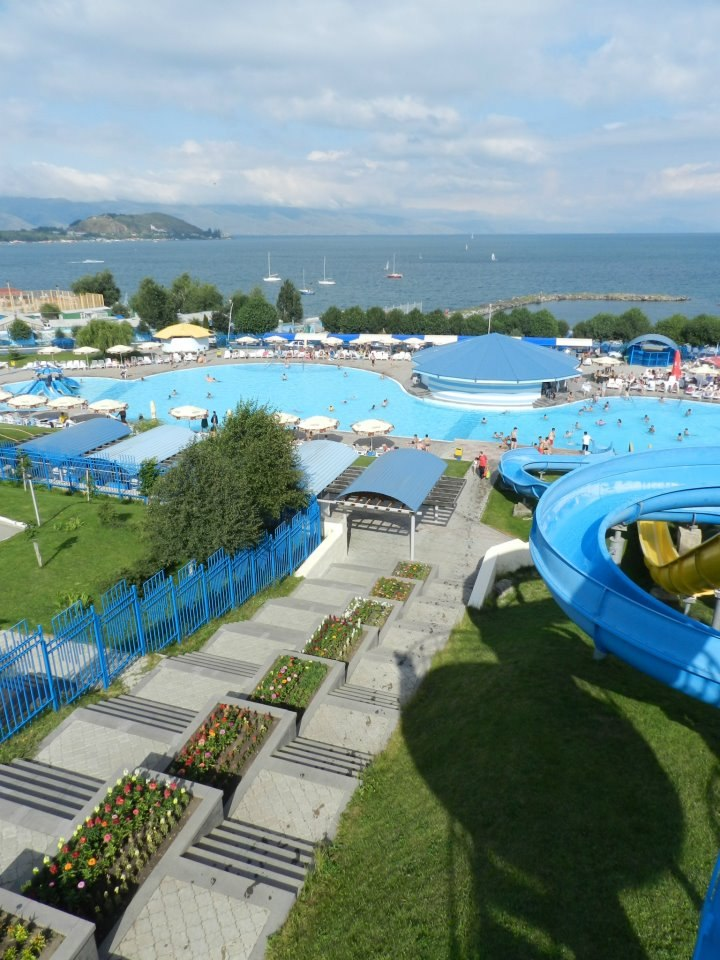
Sevan town water park

During the brief summer of the region, Sevan turns into a popular beach resort. Many professionals and amateurs visit the city to practice their favourite types of sports on the shores including beach soccer, beach volleyball, windsurfing and other types of water sports through numerous swimming beaches and facilities along the entire Sevan shore, such as the water park, the horse-riding club, the tennis courts, the mini football and basketball fields, etc.

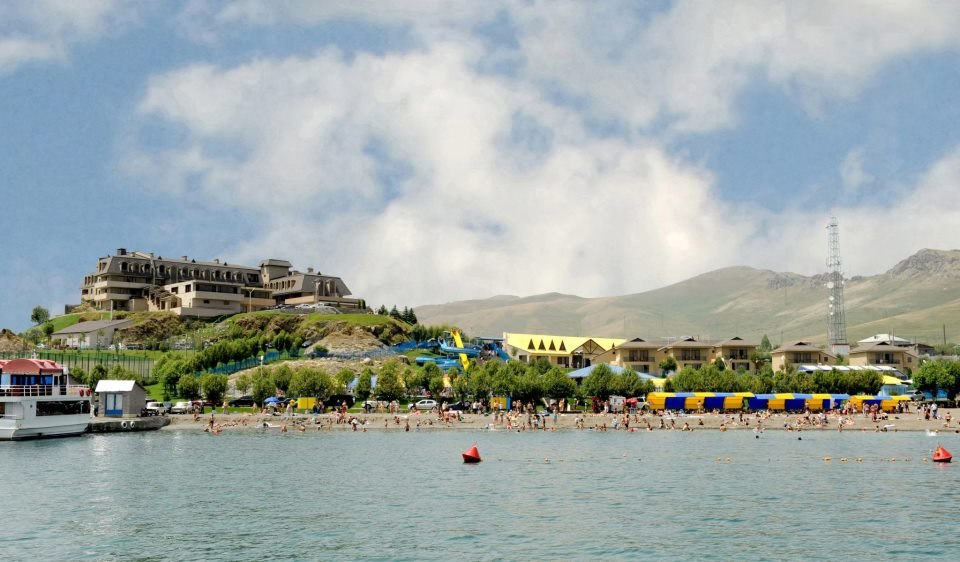
Harsnaqar Hotel and Water Park

The Harsnaqar Hotel Complex, the Best Western Bohemian Resort, the Akhtamar Sevan Hotel and the Lavanda City cottages are among the leading resorts of the town.

In February 2011, the Sevan ropeway was opened at the north of the town, in the area known as "mashtotsner", on the way to Tsovagyugh village. It has a length of 1,130 meters.

Sevan is among the 3 towns of Armenia that are allowed to accommodate gambling houses and activities in urban settlements (along with Tsaghkadzor and Jermuk).

The Sevan National Park and Sevan Botanical Garden are major destinations for the lovers of ecotourism.

Sevan has a general hospital as well as a psychiatric hospital.

== Education ==
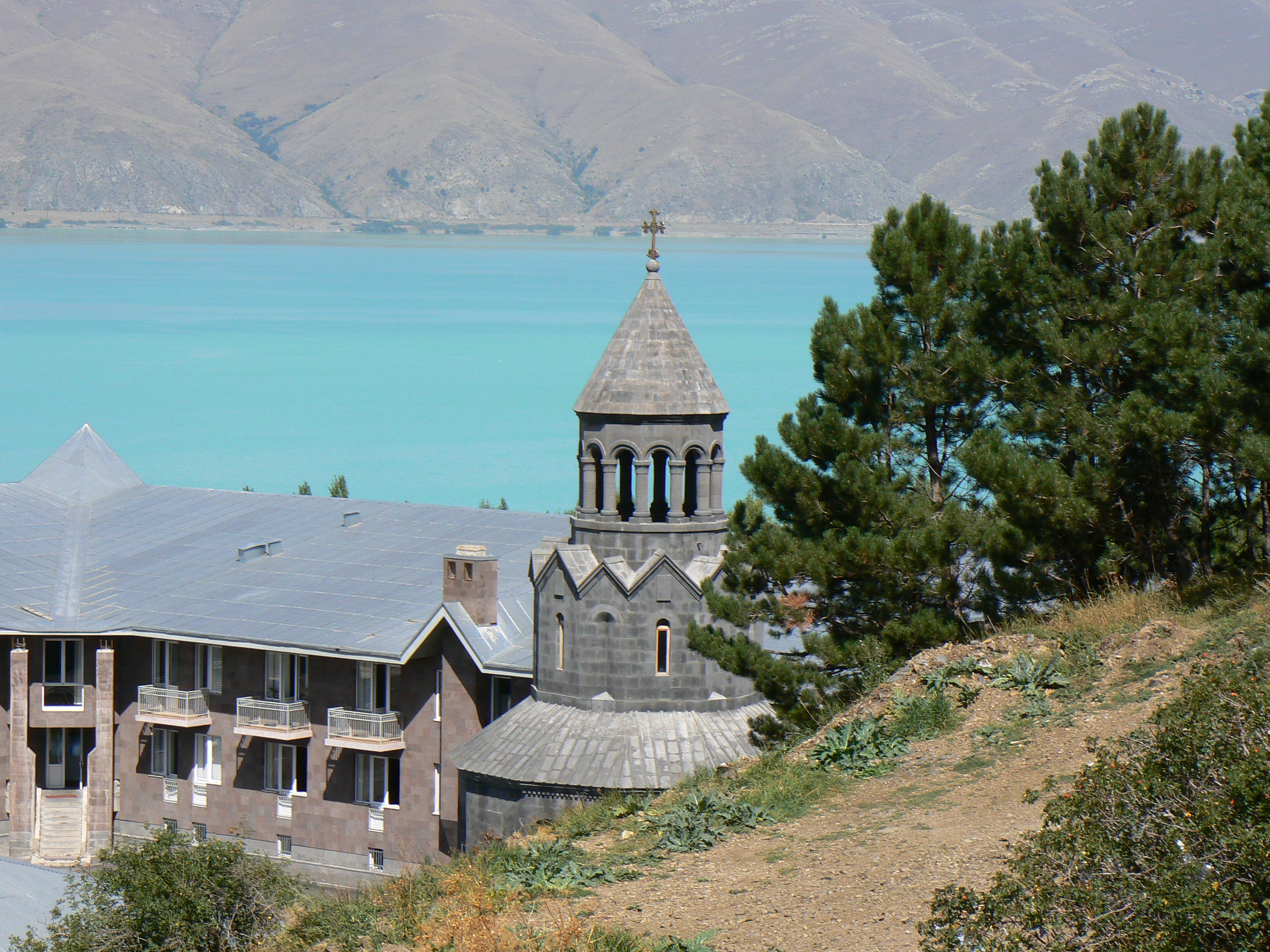
Vaskenian Academy and Surp Hakob church

As of 2016, the town is home to 7 public education schools and 4 kindergartens. The Physics Institute of National Academy of Sciences of Armenia has a branch in Sevan.

The Vaskenian Theological Academy of Sevan re-established in 1990, is among the prominent theological institutions of the South Caucasus.

== Sport ==
Between 1990 and 1994, the Akhtamar Sevan football club had represented the town in the domestic competitions. However, it became defunct due to financial difficulties. Starting from 2018, the town is represented at the Armenian football leagues by Sevan FC.

Other popular sports in Sevan include beach soccer, beach volleyball and windsurfing.

A sports complex as well as a football stadiumare being constructed in the town.

== Twin towns – sister cities ==
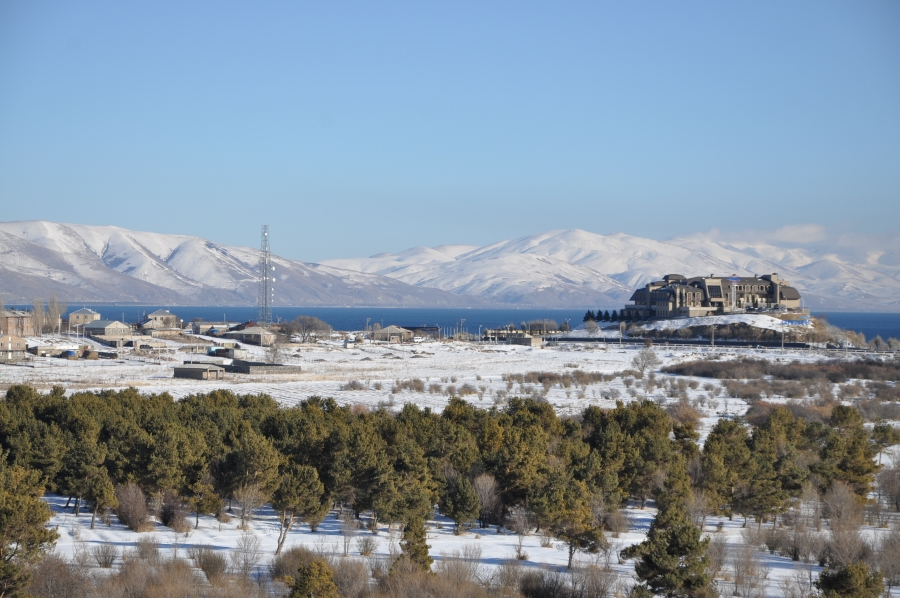
Sevan in winter

Sevan is twinned with:

- Grenoble, France (2009)
- Avigliana, Italy

== Notable people ==
- Aram Voskanyan, former footballer

== See also ==
- Gomadzor
- Lake Sevan
- Sevan Island
- Sevanavank
