= List of protected areas of Armenia =

Protected areas of Armenia

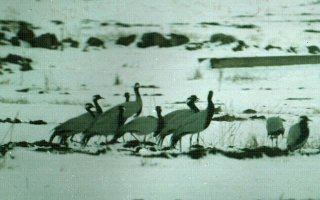
Cranes at Sevan National Park

This is a list of protected areas in Armenia that are categorized as follows: 4 national parks, 3 state reserves, 27 state sanctuaries and 5 botanical gardens. The percentage of protected land in Armenia is approximately 12.89% (2309.0853 km² 891.542819 sq mi).

== National parks ==
Name	Armenian name	Photo	Province	Area	Established
Dilijan National Park	Դիլիջան ազգային պարկ		Tavush Province	240 km^{2} 93 sq mi	1958 as state reserve, 2002 as national park
Sevan National Park	Սևան ազգային պարկ		Gegharkunik Province	342 km^{2} 132 sq mi	1978
Lake Arpi National Park	Արփի լճի ազգային պարկ		Shirak Province	250 km^{2} 97 sq mi	2009
Arevik National Park	Արևիկ ազգային պարկ		Syunik Province	344 km^{2} 133 sq mi	2009

== State reserves ==
Name	Armenian name	Photo	Province	Area	Established
Khosrov Forest State Reserve	Խոսրովի անտառ արգելոց		Ararat Province	29.196 km^{2} 11.273 sq mi	1958
Shikahogh State Reserve	Շիկահողի արգելոց		Syunik Province	10.33 km^{2} 3.99 sq mi	1958
Erebuni State Reserve	Էրեբունի արգելոց		Yerevan	1.2 km^{2} 0.46 sq mi	1981

== State wildlife sanctuaries ==
Name	Armenian name	Photo	Province	Area	Established
Akhnabad Taxus Grove Sanctuary	Ախնաբադի կենու պուրակ արգելավայր		Tavush Province	0.25 km^{2} 0.097 sq mi	1959
Aragats Alpine Sanctuary	Արագածի ալպյան արգելավայր		Aragatsotn Province	3 km^{2} 1.2 sq mi	1959
Arjatkhelni Hazel Sanctuary	Արջատխլենու արգելավայր		Tavush Province	0.4 km^{2} 0.15 sq mi	1958
Arzakan-Meghradzor Sanctuary	Արզական-Մեղրաձորի արգելավայր		Kotayk Province	135.32 km^{2} 52.25 sq mi	1971
Banks' Pine Grove Sanctuary	Բանքսի սոճու պուրակ արգելավայր		Kotayk Province	0.4 km^{2} 0.15 sq mi	1959
Boghakar Sanctuary	Բողաքարի արգելավայր		Syunik Province	27.28 km^{2} 10.53 sq mi	1989
Gandzakar Sanctuary	Գանձաքարի արգելավայր		Tavush Province	68.13 km^{2} 26.31 sq mi	1971
Getik Sanctuary	Գետիկի արգելավայր		Gegharkunik Province	57.28 km^{2} 22.12 sq mi	1971
Goravan Sands Sanctuary	Գոռավանի ավազուտներ արգելավայր		Ararat Province	0.9599 km^{2} 0.3706 sq mi	1959
Goris Sanctuary	Գորիսի արգելավայր		Syunik Province	18.5 km^{2} 7.1 sq mi	1972
Gyulagarak Sanctuary	Գյուլագարակի արգելավայր		Lori Province	25.76 km^{2} 9.95 sq mi	1958
Hankavan Hydrological Sanctuary	Հանքավանի ջրաբանական արգելավայր		Kotayk Province	51.6904 km^{2} 19.9578 sq mi	1981
Herher Open Woodland Sanctuary	Հերհերի նոսրանտառային արգելավայր		Vayots Dzor Province	61.39 km^{2} 23.70 sq mi	1958
Ijevan Sanctuary	Իջևանի արգելավայր		Tavush Province	59.08 km^{2} 22.81 sq mi	1971
Jermuk Forest Sanctuary	Ջերմուկի անտառային արգելավայր		Vayots Dzor Province	38.65 km^{2} 14.92 sq mi	1958
Jermuk Hydrological Sanctuary	Ջերմուկի ջրաբանական արգելավայր		Vayots Dzor Province	173.71 km^{2} 67.07 sq mi	1981
Juniper Woodlands Sanctuary	Գիհու նոսրանտառային արգելավայր		Gegharkunik Province	33.12 km^{2} 12.79 sq mi	1958
Khor Virap Sanctuary	Խոր Վիրապ արգելավայր		Ararat Province	0.5028 km^{2} 0.1941 sq mi	2007
Khustup Sanctuary	Խուստուփ արգելավայր		Syunik Province	69.47 km^{2} 26.82 sq mi	2014
Margahovit Sanctuary	Մարգահովիտի արգելավայր		Lori Province	33.68 km^{2} 13.00 sq mi	1971
Plane Grove Sanctuary	Սոսու պուրակ արգելավայր		Syunik Province	0.6 km^{2} 0.23 sq mi	1958
Rhododendron caucasicum Sanctuary	Կովկասյան մրտավարդենու արգելավայր		Lori Province	10 km^{2} 3.9 sq mi	1958
Sev Lake Sanctuary	Սև լիճ արգելավայր		Syunik Province	2.4 km^{2} 0.93 sq mi	2001
Vordan Karmir Sanctuary	Որդան կարմիր արգելավայր		Armavir Province	2.1985 km^{2} 0.8488 sq mi	1987
Yeghegnadzor Sanctuary	Եղեգնաձորի արգելավայր		Vayots Dzor Province	42 km^{2} 16 sq mi	1971
Zangezur Sanctuary	Զանգեզուր արգելավայր		Syunik Province	173.6877 km^{2} 67.0612 sq mi	2009
Zikatar Sanctuary	Զիկատար արգելավայր		Tavush Province	1.5 km^{2} 0.58 sq mi	2010

== Botanical gardens ==
Name	Armenian name	Photo	Province	Area	Established
Stepanavan Dendropark	Սոճուտ բուսաբանական այգի		Lori Province	0.35 km^{2} 0.14 sq mi	1931
Yerevan Botanical Garden	Երևանի բուսաբանական այգի		Yerevan	0.8 km^{2} 0.31 sq mi	1935
Ijevan Dendropark	Իջևանի դենդրոպարկ		Tavush Province	0.08 km^{2} 0.031 sq mi	1962
Vanadzor Botanical Garden	Վանաձորի բուսաբանական այգի		Lori Province	0.12 km^{2} 0.046 sq mi	1936
Sevan Botanical Garden	Սևանի բուսաբանական այգի		Gegharkunik Province	0.05 km^{2} 0.019 sq mi	1944

== See also ==
- Fauna of Armenia
- List of birds of Armenia
- List of mammals of Armenia
- Wildlife of Armenia
