= FC Akhtamar =

Akhtamar
- Full name: Football Club Akhtamar
- Founded: 1990; 35 years ago
- Dissolved: 2022; 3 years ago
- Ground: Lchashen Stadium
- Capacity: 2,000
- 2021-22: Amateur A-League, 1st

FC Akhtamar (Armenian: Ֆուտբոլային Ակումբ Ախթամար), is a defunct Armenian football club from Sevan, Gegharkunik Province. The club was dissolved in early 1994 due to financial difficulties and is currently inactive from professional football. The club returned to play in the Amateur A-League for the inaugural 2021–22 season, winning the title, but disbanded after the season.

== League record ==
Year	Club Name	Division	Position	GP	W	D	L	GS	GA	GD	PTS
1992	Akhtamar	Armenian Premier League	22	22	5	5	12	28	42	-14	15
1993	Akhtamar	Armenian First League	4	22	13	3	6	45	16	+29	29
1994–2021	Akhtamar	no participation									
2021–22	Akhtamar	Amateur A-League	1	20	17	2	1	87	16	+71	53
2022–present	Akhtamar	no participation									
