= Darevskia spitzenbergerae =

Scientific classification
- Kingdom: Animalia
- Phylum: Chordata
- Class: Reptilia
- Order: Squamata
- Family: Lacertidae
- Genus: Darevskia
- Species: D. spitzenbergerae

Binomial name
- Darevskia spitzenbergerae (Eiselt, Darevsky, & Schmidtler, 1992)

Synonyms
- Darevskia valentini spitzenbergerae (Crucitti et al., 2023)

Species of lizard

Darevskia spitzenbergerae, the Caucasian rock lizard or Valentin's lizard, is a lizard species in the genus Darevskia. It is endemic to Turkey. It has also been classified as a subspecies of Darevskia valentini.
