= Feliks Tsolakyan =

Armenian politician

- Ֆելիքս Ցոլակյան

Minister of Emergency Situations
- In office 4 October 2018 – 20 November 2020
- President: Armen Sarkissian
- Prime Minister: Nikol Pashinyan
- Preceded by: Hrachya Rostomyan
- Succeeded by: Andranik Piloyan

Member of the National Assembly of Armenia
- In office 2 April 2017 – 9 December 2018
- Parliamentary group: Republican Party of Armenia
- Constituency: Shirak

Governor of Shirak
- In office 7 March 2013 – 2016
- President: Serzh Sargsyan
- Preceded by: Ashot Giziryan

Personal details
- Born: January 27, 1952 (age 74) Nerkin Dzhrapi, Armenian SSR, Soviet Union
- Party: Independent
- Education: Yerevan State University

Military service
- Branch/service: Ministry of Emergency Situations
- Rank: Lieutenant General

Feliks Hostegovi Tsolakyan (Armenian: Ֆելիքս Ցոլակյան; born 27 January 1952) is an Armenian political figure and the current Minister of Emergency Situations.

On 1 May 2018, Tsolakyan was the sole member of the Republican Party of Armenia caucus who voted in favour of electing Nikol Pashinyan to the position of Prime Minister.

== Early life and professional career ==
Tsolakyan was born in the village of Nerkin Dzhrapi, Ani region of Armenian SSR, Soviet Union. Tsolakyan graduated from the History department of Yerevan State University in 1974.

Tsolakyan began his career at the Ararat Industrial and Technological College upon his graduation in 1974. In 1980, he joined the State Security Committee, where he served in police services in Goris and Yeghegnadzor. In 1996, he headed the State Security Committee of the Shirak region, before heading the Control Service of the President of the Republic of the Armenia in 1999. From 2003 to 2007, he headed the State Tax Service. From 2007 to 2013, he was the Deputy Director of the National Security Service in the Armenian civil service.

== Political career ==
In 2013, he was appointed Governor of the Shirak marz, where he served until 2016. He was elected to the National Assembly in the 2017 Armenian parliamentary election, representing the 11th electoral district (Shirak), under the Republican Party of Armenia's electoral list. Tsolakyan was appointed as Minister of Emergency Situations of Armenia on 4 October 2018, following the removal of his predecessor by Prime Minister Nikol Pashinyan.

== Awards ==
2005: Anania Shirakatsi Medal

2016: Medal “For Services Contributed to the Motherland”
