= Nerkin Dzhrapi =

- Location within Armenia
- Coordinates: 40°33′N 43°39′E
- Country: Armenia
- Marz (Province): Shirak
- Time zone

Nerkin Dzhrapi (also, Chirpili, Jrapi, and Dzhrapi) is a former village in the Shirak Province of Armenia which was intentionally flooded by the Akhurian Reservoir. It was replaced by a new village named Dzhrapi. It contained an 11th-century caravanserai and a medieval bridge across the Akhuryan River; the river demarcates the Armenian-Turkish border.
