= Gomadzor =

Neighborhood in Sevan, Armenia

- Location within Armenia Location within Gegharkunik
- Coordinates: 40°33′49″N 44°56′55″E
- Country: Armenia
- Marz (Province): Gegharkunik
- Time zone: UTC+4 ( )
  - Summer (DST): UTC+5 ( )

Gomadzor is a residential neighborhood in the town of Sevan of Gegharkunik Province, Armenia. It is located to the north of the town centre.

== See also ==
- Gegharkunik Province
