= Sevan Botanical Garden =

Botanical garden in Sevan, Armenia

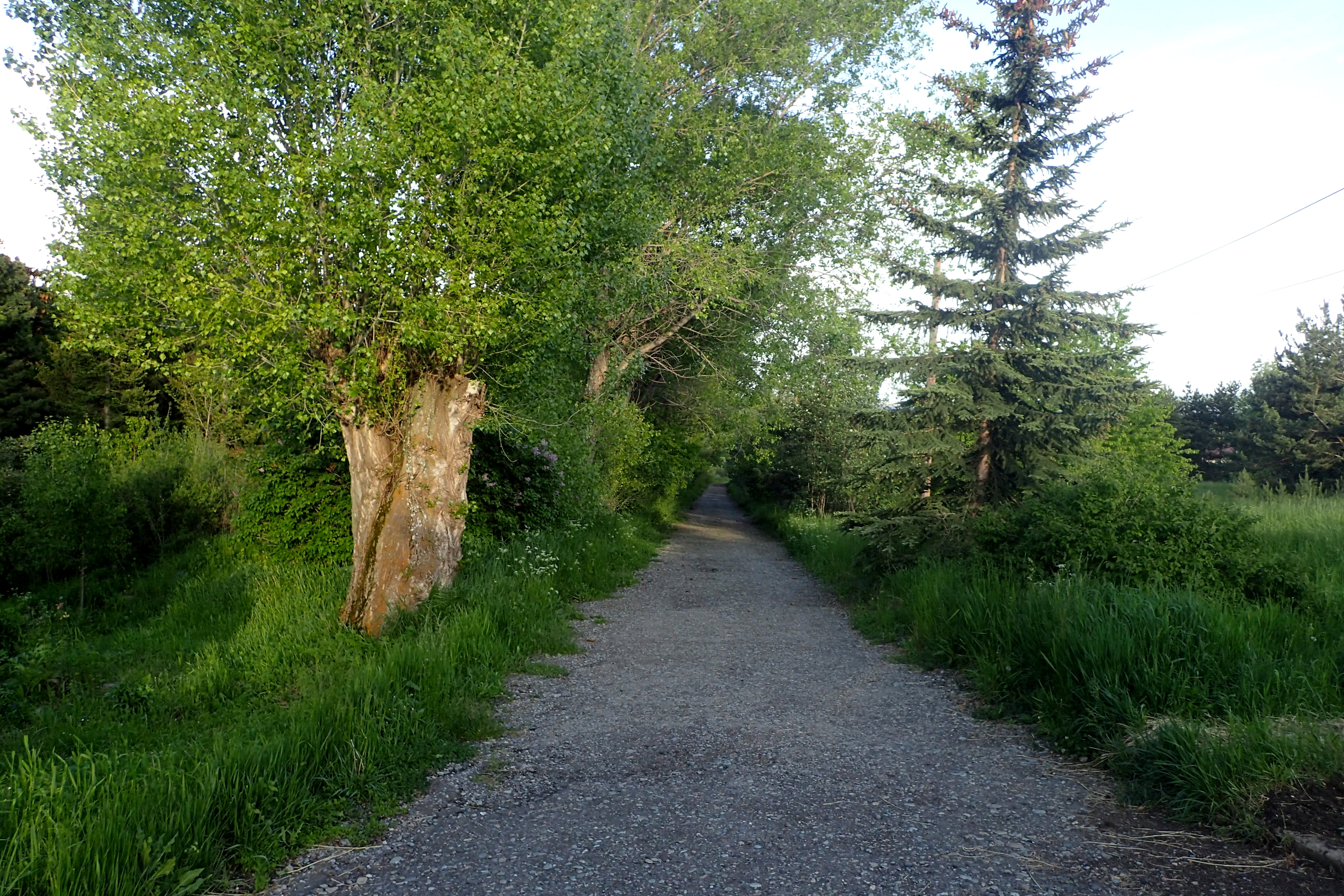
- Trail inside the Sevan Botanical Garden

- Location within Armenia
- Nearest city: Sevan, Armenia
- Coordinates: 40°33′26.5″N 44°58′09.8″E
- Area: 5 ha (12 acres)
- Established: 1944

Sevan Botanical Garden (Armenian: Սևանի բուսաբանական այգի), is a botanical garden founded in 1944 in the northern Armenian town of Sevan, near the Tsamakaberd neighbourhood. The garden is operating as a satellite of the Yerevan Botanical Garden under the supervision of the Armenian National Academy of Sciences.

Located at a height of 2000 meters above sea level and having a dry, continental climate, the area is characterized by cold winters and hot summers. The garden is home to around 650 species (including 225 species of trees), from Armenia, North America, Asia, Central and Eastern Europe, the Mediterranean and the Himalayas.

In 2015, a green house was opened within the garden.

== Gallery ==
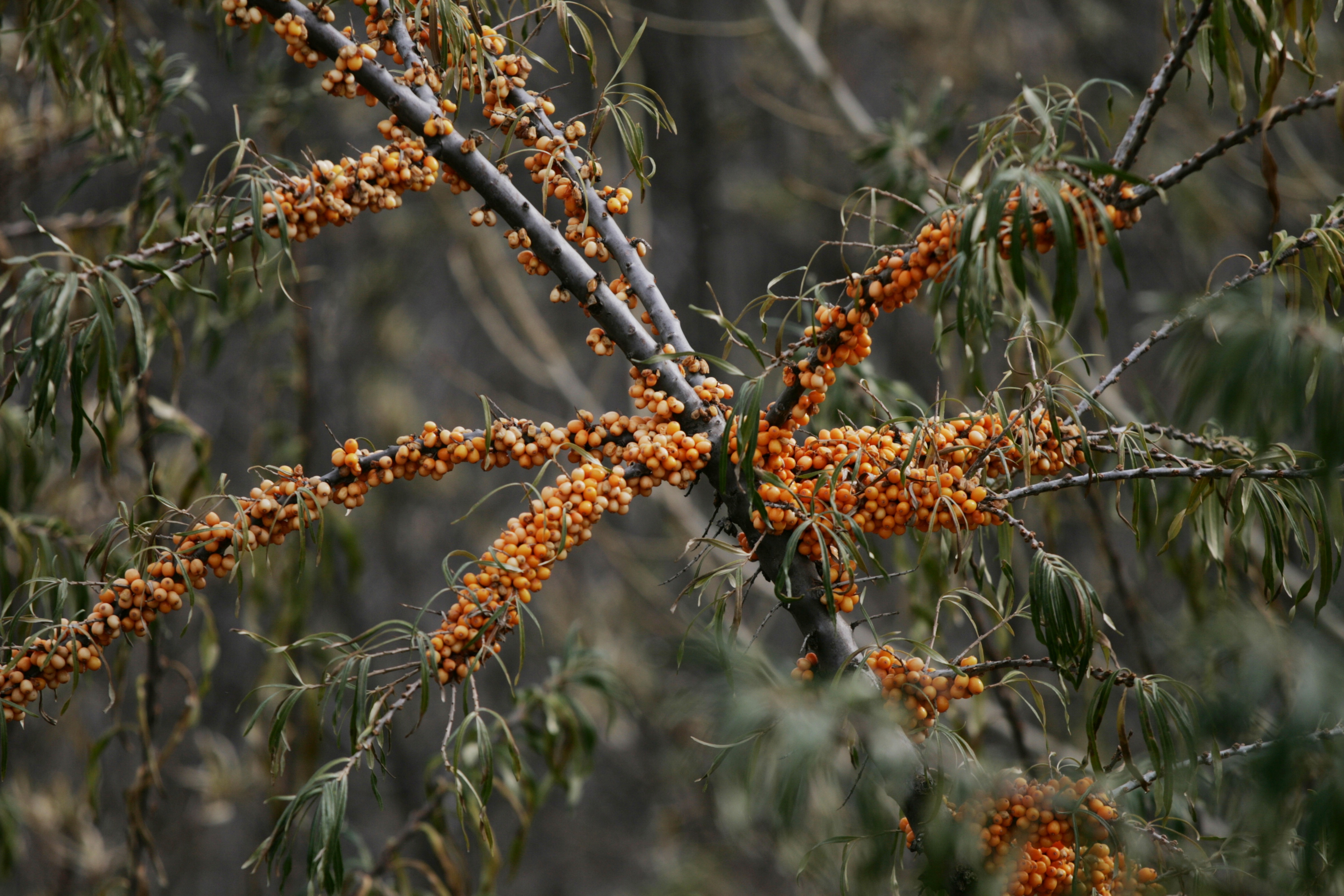
Hippophae rhamnoides

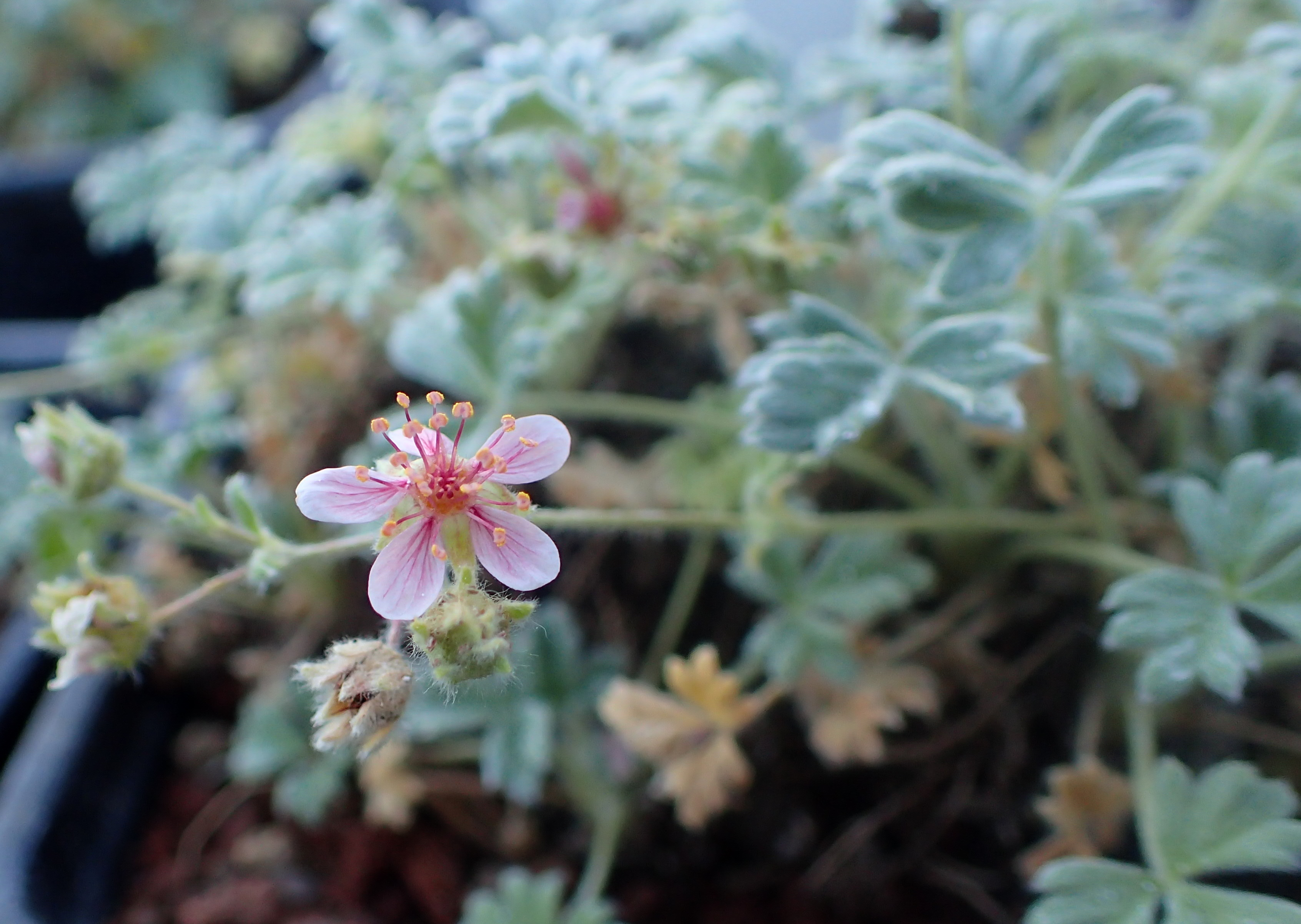
Potentilla porphyrantha

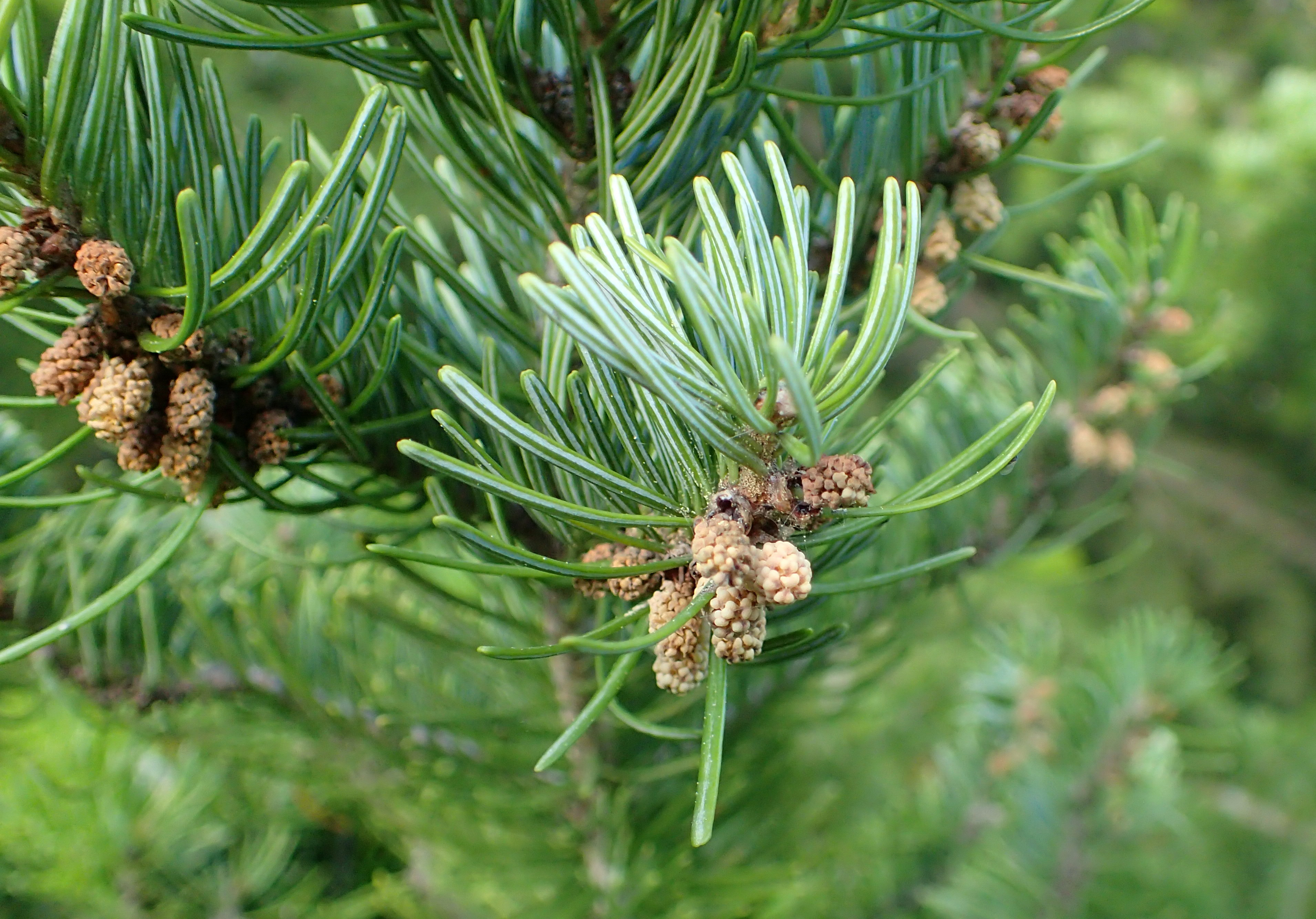
Abies sibirica

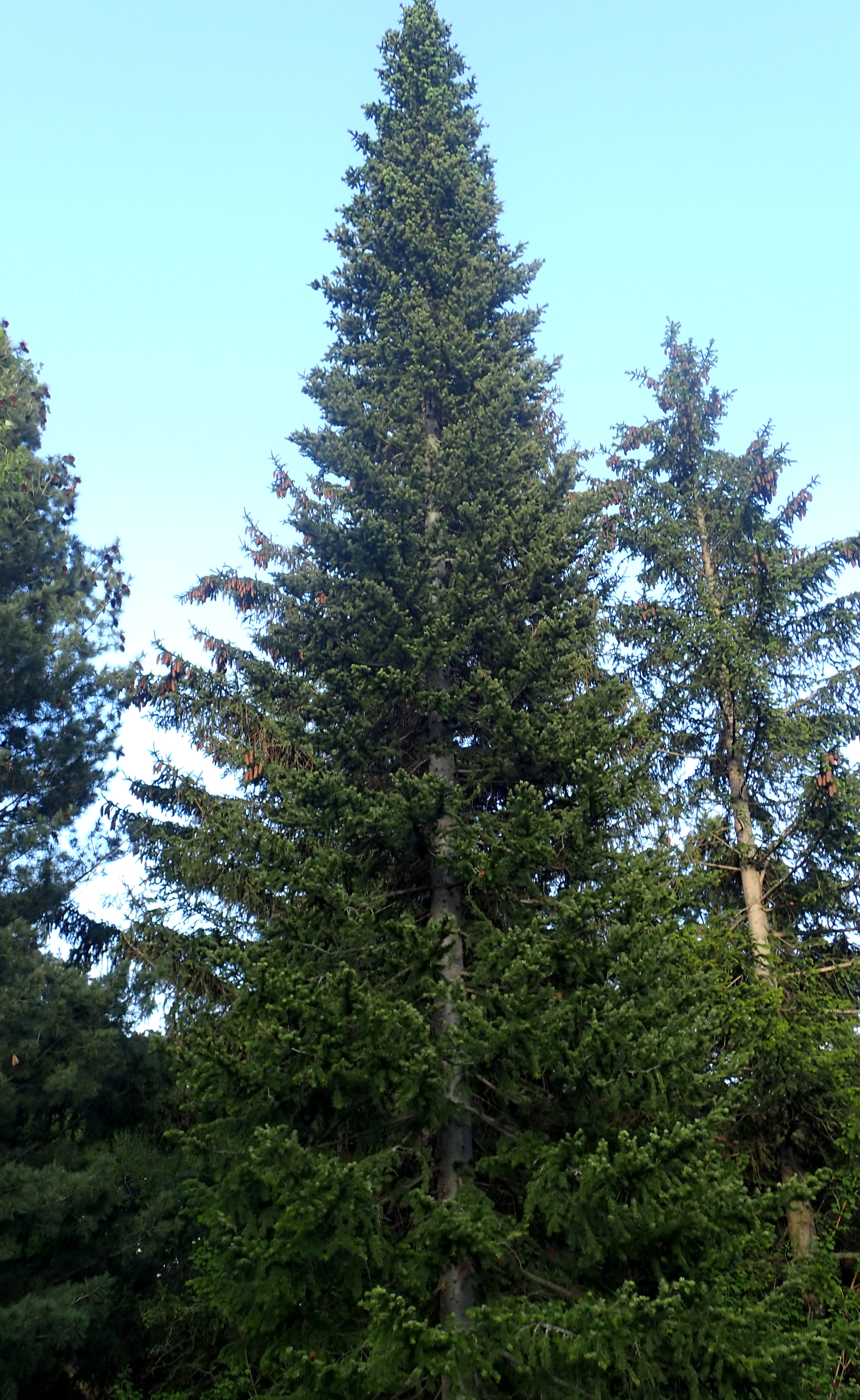
Abies sibirica tree
