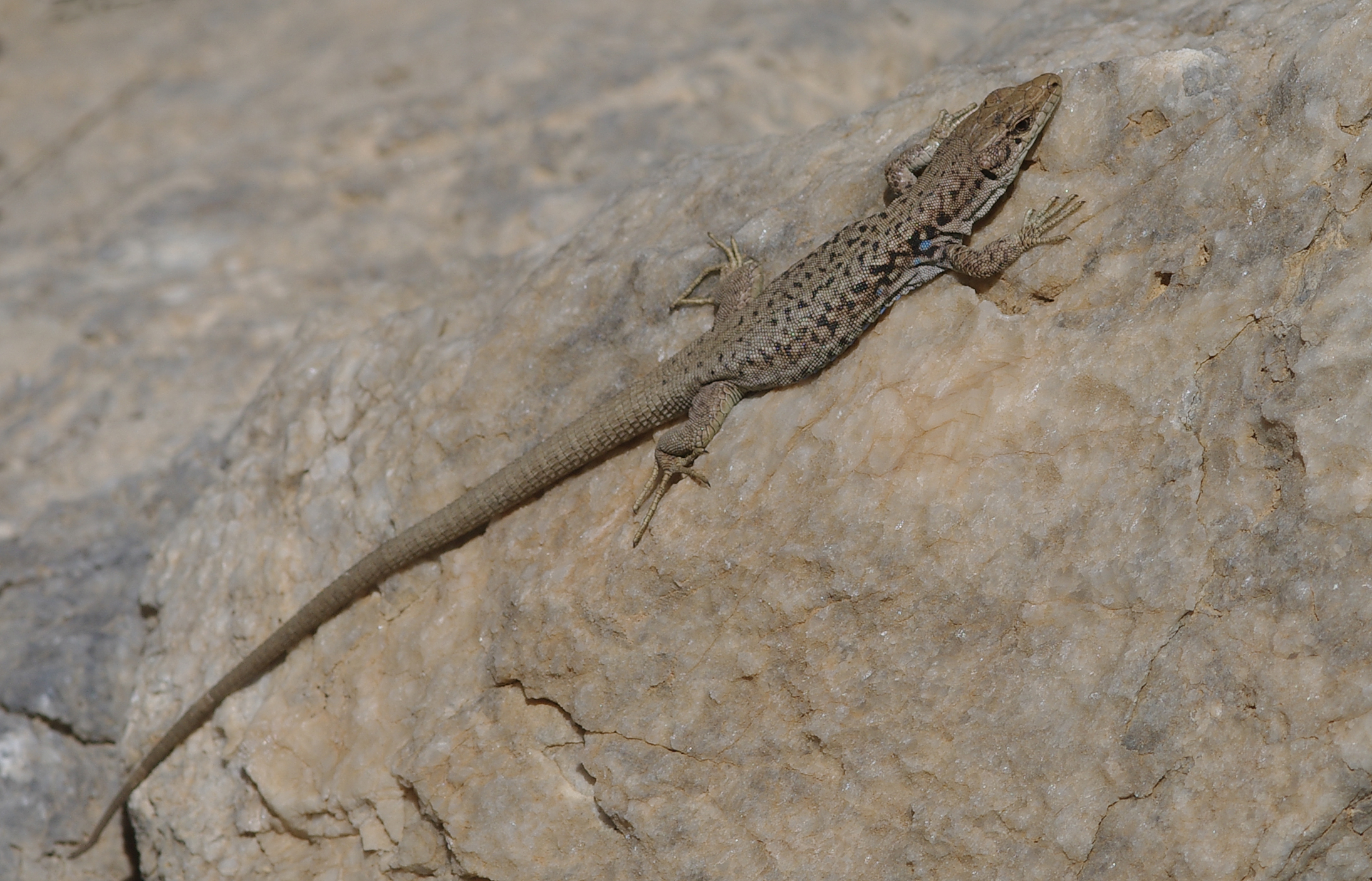

Conservation status
- Least Concern (IUCN 3.1)

Scientific classification
- Kingdom: Animalia
- Phylum: Chordata
- Class: Reptilia
- Order: Squamata
- Family: Lacertidae
- Genus: Darevskia
- Species: D. valentini

Binomial name
- Darevskia valentini (Boettger, 1892)

Synonyms
- Lacerta muralis var. valentini Boettger, 1892; Lacerta saxicola valentini — Méhelÿ, 1909; Lacerta valentini — Engelmann et al., 1993; Darevskia valentini — Arribas, 1997; Lacerta (Archaeolacerta) valentini — Fu, 2000; Archaeolacerta (Caucasilacerta) valentini — Sindaco et al., 2000; Darevskia valentini — Bischoff, 2002

= Darevskia valentini =

Species of lizard

Darevskia valentini, also known commonly as the Caucasian rock lizard or Valentin's lizard, is a species of lizard in the family Lacertidae. The species is native to southeastern Europe and western Asia. There are three recognized subspecies.

== Etymology ==
The specific name, valentini, is in honor of naturalist Jean Valentin (1868–1898), who was associated with the Senckenberg Naturmuseum.

== Geographic range ==
D. valentini is found in Armenia, Georgia, Iran, and Turkey.

== Habitat ==
The preferred natural habitats of D. valentini are rocky areas, grassland, and shrubland, at altitudes of 1,300–3,000 m (4,300–9,800 ft).

== Reproduction ==
D. valentini is oviparous.

== Subspecies ==
Three subspecies are recognized as being valid, including the nominotypical subspecies.

- Darevskia valentini lantzicyreni (Darevsky & Eiselt, 1967)
- Darevskia valentini spitzenbergerae (Eiselt, Darevsky & Schmidtler, 1992)
- Darevskia valentini valentini (Boettger, 1892)

Nota bene: A trinomial authority in parentheses indicates that the subspecies was originally described in a genus other than Darevskia.
