= Verin Dzhrapi =

- Location within Armenia Location within Shirak
- Coordinates: 40°35′N 43°41′E
- Country: Armenia
- Marz (Province): Shirak
- Time zone: UTC+4 ( )
  - Summer (DST): UTC+5 ( )

Verin Dzhrapi (also, Kegach) is a town in the Shirak Province of Armenia.
