= Ministry of Environment (Armenia) =

Government ministry of Armenia

Ministry of Environment of Armenia
- Հայաստանի շրջակա միջավայրի նախարարություն

Agency overview
- Formed: 1991; 35 years ago
- Jurisdiction: Government of Armenia
- Headquarters: Yerevan, Armenia
- Minister responsible: Hambardzum Matevosyan, Minister of Environment
- Website: www.env.am

The Ministry of Environment (Armenian: Հայաստանի շրջակա միջավայրի նախարարություն) is a department of the Government of Armenia with responsibility for environmental protection and natural heritage.

== History ==
It was created as the Ministry of Nature and Environment Protection following Armenia's independence in 1991, and was subsequently renamed as the Ministry of Nature Protection and Lithosphere in 1995. Later, it was renamed Ministry of Nature Protection. It is also oftentimes referred to as the Ministry of Ecology.

The current Minister of Environment is Hakob Simidyan.

From 1997, officials at the Ministry have reported to the international Convention on Biological Diversity (CBD). In 1999, the combined work of eight groups of specialists resulted in a "First National Report on Biodiversity of Armenia" and a "Biodiversity Strategy and Action Plan", which were prepared in line with CBD guidelines and the priority development goals of Armenia.

== See also ==
- Armenia Tree Project
- Lake Sevan
- List of protected areas of Armenia
- My Forest Armenia
- Sevan National Park
