= Tsamakaberd =

Neighborhood in Sevan, Armenia

- Location within Armenia Location within Gegharkunik
- Coordinates: 40°34′12″N 44°59′13″E
- Country: Armenia
- Marz (Province): Gegharkunik
- Time zone: UTC+4 ( )

Tsamakaberd, is a residential neighborhood in the town of Sevan of Gegharkunik Province, Armenia. It is located to the north east of the town centre. It is home to a cyclopean fortress, and the historic district of Mashtotsner.

== See also ==
- Gegharkunik Province
