= Sevan National Park =

National park in Armenia

- IUCN category II (national park)
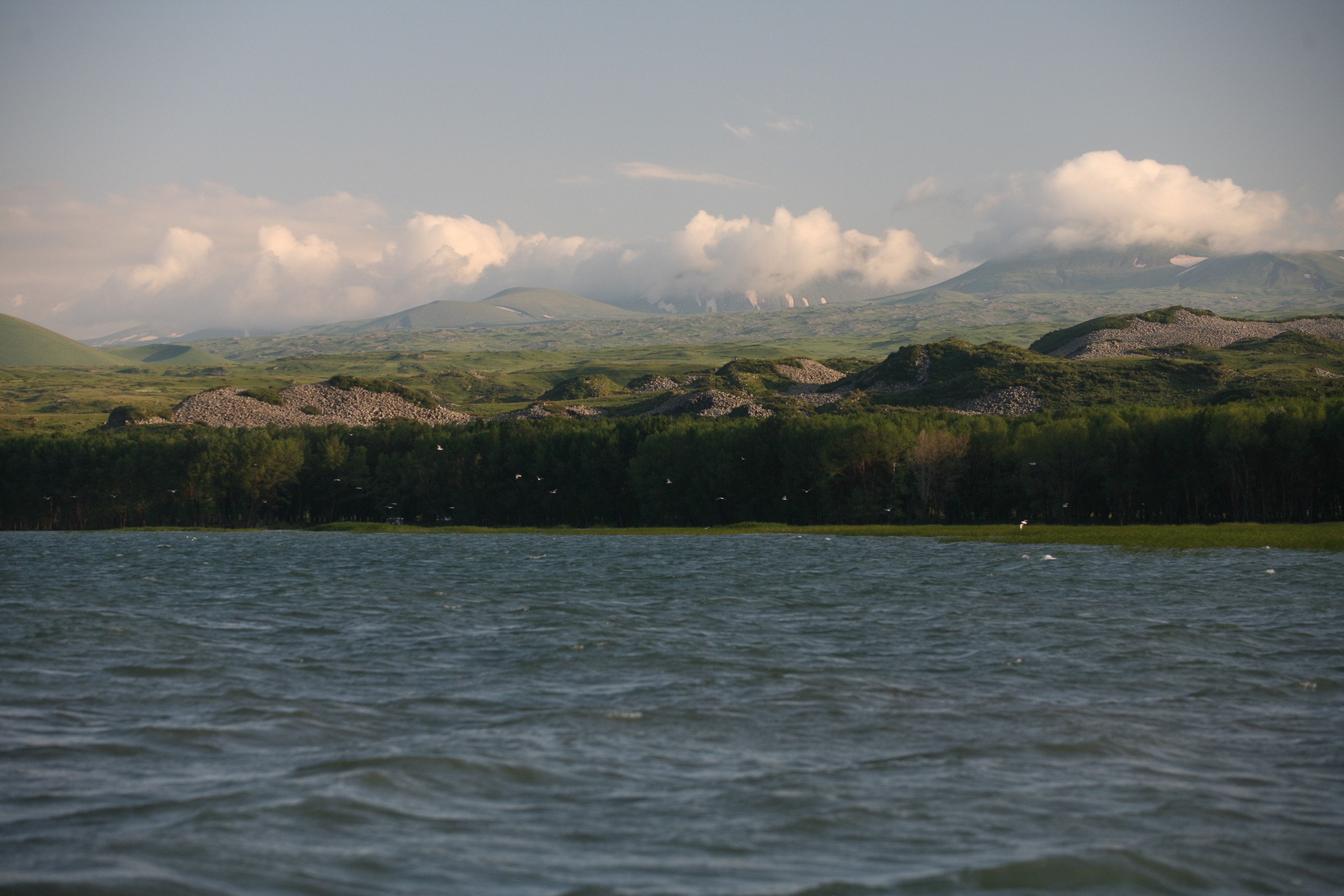

- Location within Armenia
- Location: Gegharkunik Province, Armenia
- Coordinates: 40°20′46″N 45°20′04″E
- Area: 342 km^{2} (132 sq mi)
- Established: 1978
- Governing body: Ministry of Environment

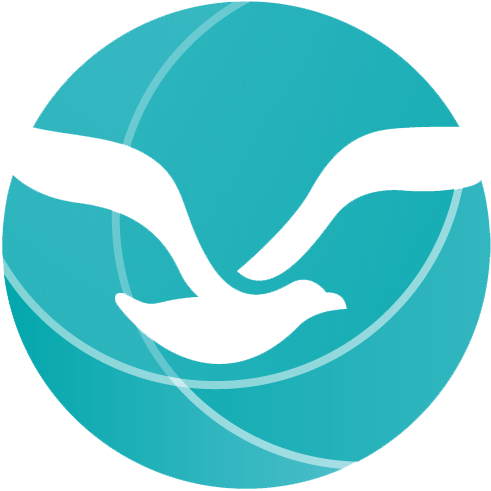
Logo of Sevan National Park

Sevan National Park (Armenian: Սևան ազգային պարկ, romanized: Sevan azgayin park) is one of the four protected national parks of Armenia, founded in 1978 to protect Lake Sevan and the surrounding areas. It is under the jurisdiction of the Ministry of Environment and includes a research center, which monitors the ecosystems, and undertakes various conservation measures. Licensed fishing on the lake is also regulated.

== Fauna ==
=== Mammals ===
Scientific knowledge about the mammals of the Sevan basin is quite poor and fragmental. Wolf, jackal, fox, marten, cat, hare, small rodents are usually mentioned.

=== Avifauna ===
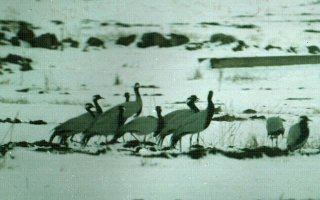
Cranes

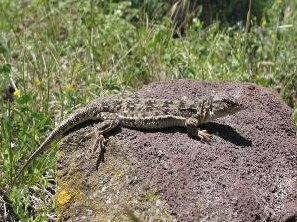
Eremias arguta transcaucasica

Sevan lake and its vicinity are rich in avifauna. Up to 267 bird species have been recorded in Sevan Basin. The known avifauna can be grouped into the orders: Podicipediformes, Pelecaniformes, Phoenicopteriformes, Falconiformes, Anseriformes, Galliformes, Gruiformes, Charadriiformes, Columbiformes, Cuculiformes, Strigiformes, Caprimulgiformes, Apodiformes, Coraciiformes, Piciformes, and Passeriformes. 56 species are included in the Red Book of Animals of the Republic of Armenia. Two of the species are regional endemics Armenian gull (Larus armenicus) and Mountain Chiffchaff (Phylloscopus sindianus). The Lake's avifauna faced significant decline after lowering the water level and drying the Gilli marshes, however, started from 2007, the return of some bird species was noted. With strengthening of protection regime, which was started in 2013 the returning of species continues.

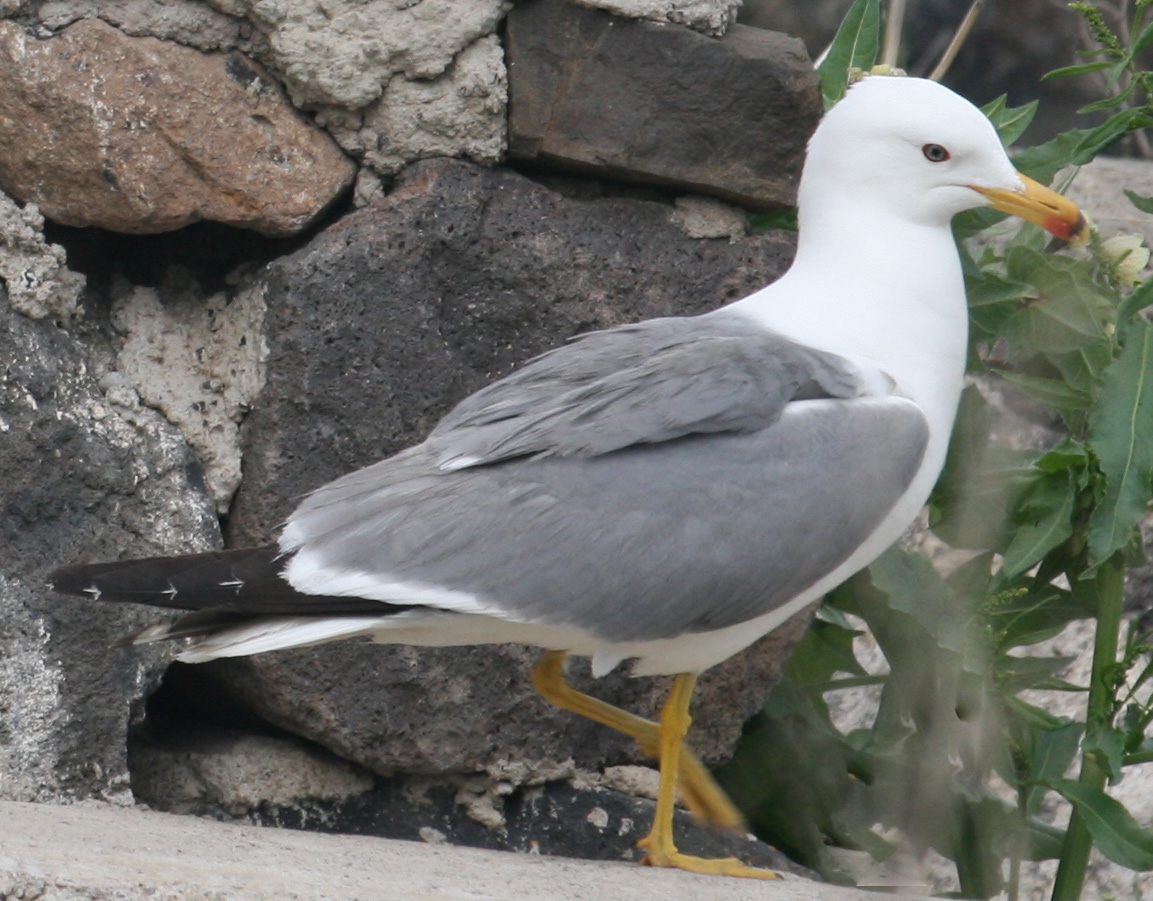
Armenian gull (Larus armenicus)

=== Herpetofauna ===
In the Masrik River valley, the following species of reptiles and amphibians can be found: Bufotes viridis, Hyla arborea, Pelophylax ridibundus, Rana macrocnemis, Paralaudakia caucasia, Anguis fragilis, Eremias arguta, Lacerta agilis, Lacerta strigata, Parvilacerta parva, Darevskia unisexualis, Darevskia valentini, Platyceps najadum, Hemorrhois ravergieri, Coronella austriaca, Eirenis punctatolineatus, Natrix natrix, Natrix tessellata, Vipera ursinii.

=== Ichtyofauna ===
Masrik river and its tributaries flow in the proximity of the urban areas. The river is of great importance, since it is a spawning place for such endemic species as Sevan trout (Salmo ischchan), Sevan koghak (Capoeta sevangi) Besides, the young fish of the aforementioned species also live in these rivers till one year of age. This period is very important for the future survival of the species. Sevan trout and are included in the Red List of Armenia as endangered species.

=== Terrestrial Invertebrates ===
On the whole territory of Gegharkunik marz in general, there are 55 groups of invertebrates, mainly arthropoda, mollusks, crustacea, arachnida, etc. There are a few dozens of endemic species, of which 44 coleoptera, 2 lepidoptera, 2 оrthoptera, 2 mollusks. In the Red Book of the USSR, there were 12 species of arthropoda, of which 6 butterflies, 5 hymenoptera and 1 cricket. In the IUCN Red List, there are 4 invertebrate species, inhabiting Sevan Basin, one of which is included in the list of Convention on the Conservation of European Wildlife and Natural Habitats (Bern Convention). Among butterflies (Rhopalocera), the following species are included in the Red Book of the Animals of the Republic of Armenia: Parnassius apollo, Parnassius mnemosyne, Brenthis ino, Phengaris alcon, Phengaris arion, Phengaris nausithous, and Polyommatus ninae. Part of the area is recognized as Artanish-Shorzha Prime Butterfly Area.

== Flora ==
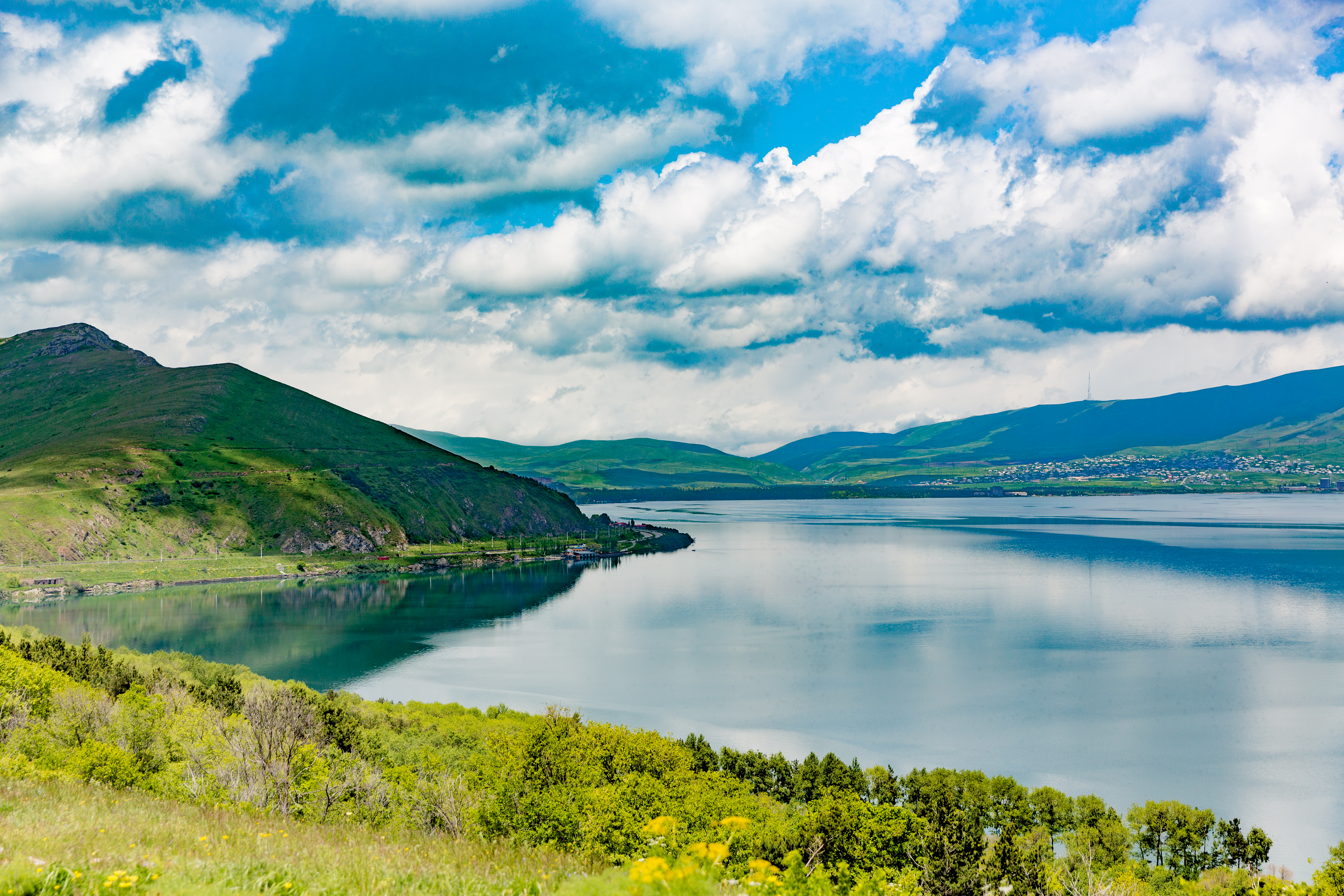
Lake Sevan and the park in June 2016

The basin of Lake Sevan is a crossroad for mezophile and Armenian-Iranian xerophile flora belts. In the territory of Sevan National Park 1145 species of vascular plants can be met, in the protection belt – 1587 species. The flora of the park is presented by 28 species of trees, 42 species of bushes, 866 perennial herbs and 307 species of annual and biennial plants. The territory of Sevan National Park and its protection belt, which also includes Vardenis, 23 plants, endemic for Armenia, can be met, of which 13 are endemic for Sevan floristic area. Only on the territory of Sevan National Park 3 Armenian endemic and 5 Sevan basin endemic plant species can be met. 17 species are included in the Red Book of Armenia (in the protection belt there are 48). In the territory of Sevan National Park and its protection belt, about 60 herbs can be used for officinal purposes. More than 100 are edible.

== See also ==
- List of protected areas of Armenia
