= Akhurian Reservoir =

Manmade lake in Armenia and Turkey

- Ախուրյանի ջրամբար Arpaçay Reservoir
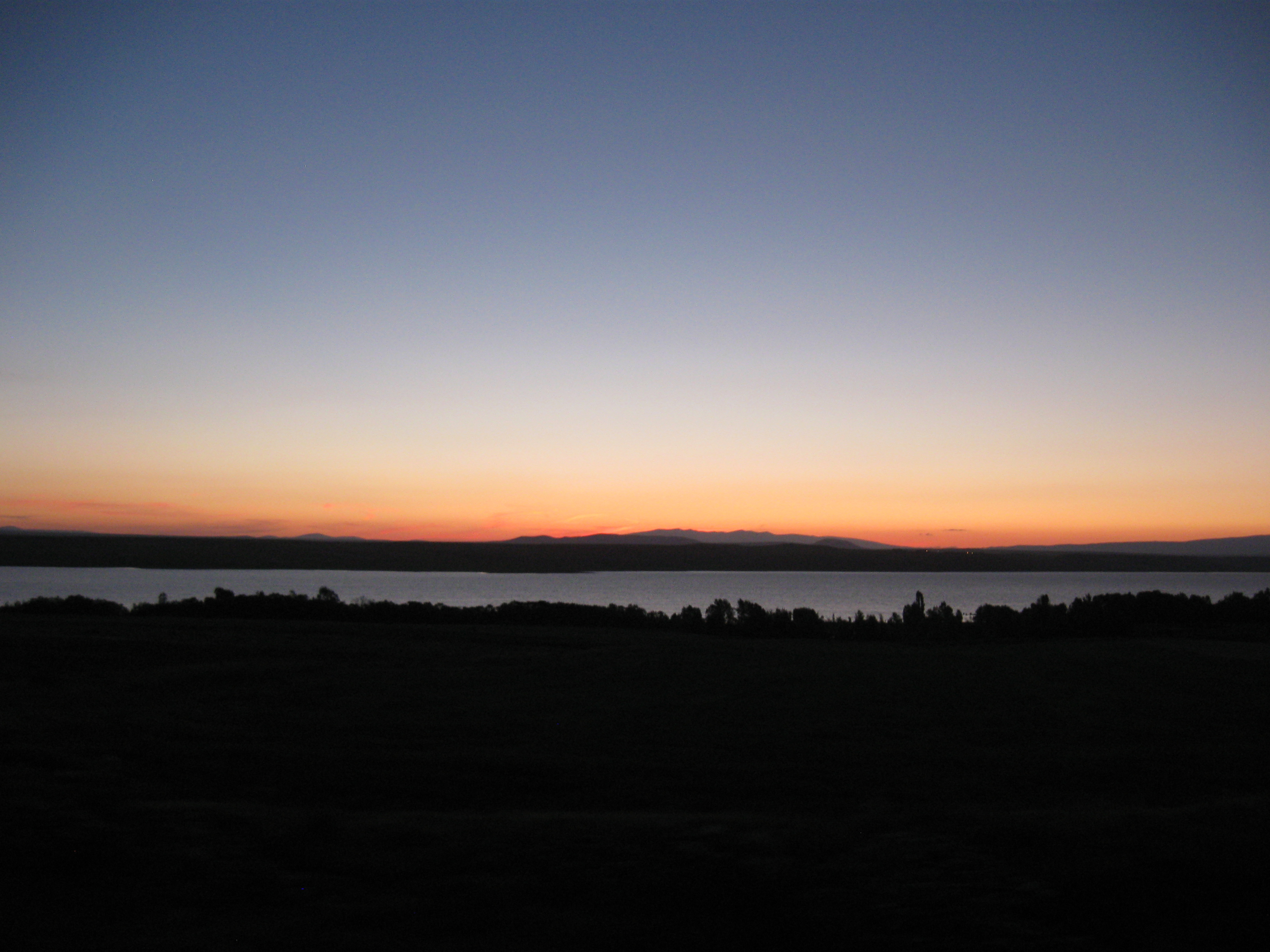

- Location within Armenia Location within Turkey Location within Caucasus Mountains
- Interactive map of Akhurian Reservoir
- Location: Shirak Province-Kars Province
- Coordinates: 40°33′47.67″N 43°39′16.26″E
- Primary inflows: Akhuryan
- Primary outflows: Akhuryan
- Basin countries: Armenia; Turkey
- Built: 1975–1980
- First flooded: 1980
- Max. length: 20 km (12 mi)
- Surface area: 54 km^{2} (21 sq mi)
- Max. depth: 59 m (194 ft) (the dam)
- Water volume: 0.525 km^{3} (0.126 cu mi)
- Surface elevation: 1,600 m (5,200 ft)
- Settlements: Aghin

Akhurian Reservoir (Armenian: Ախուրյանի ջրամբար; Turkish: Arpaçay Baraj Gölü) is a reservoir on the Akhurian River between Armenia and Turkey. The reservoir has a surface area of 54 km^{2} and a volume of 525 million cubic meters. It is one of the largest reservoirs in the Caucasus, although smaller than the Mingachevir reservoir and the Shamkir reservoir in Azerbaijan.

Its water is used for irrigation in Armenia's Aragatsotn, Armavir and Shirak provinces. Its water is used in Turkey for irrigation (70000 ha agricultural area) in the provinces of Kars and Ardahan.

== Foundation ==
On April 25, 1963, Turkey and the Soviet Union (which Armenia was part of at the time) signed an agreement on constructing a dam on Akhurian River and regulating the flow of four rivers into the reservoir. It was built between 1975 and 1980 and began to be operated in 1980.

== Pollution ==
According to Armenian researchers, "the water system is polluted with heavy metals and different toxic materials."
