= Yerevan Botanical Garden =

Botanical garden in Armenia

Coordinates: 40.21083°N 44.557064°E

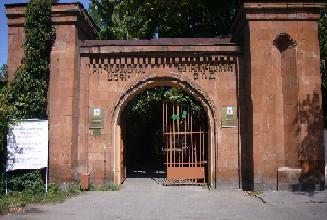
Main Entrance

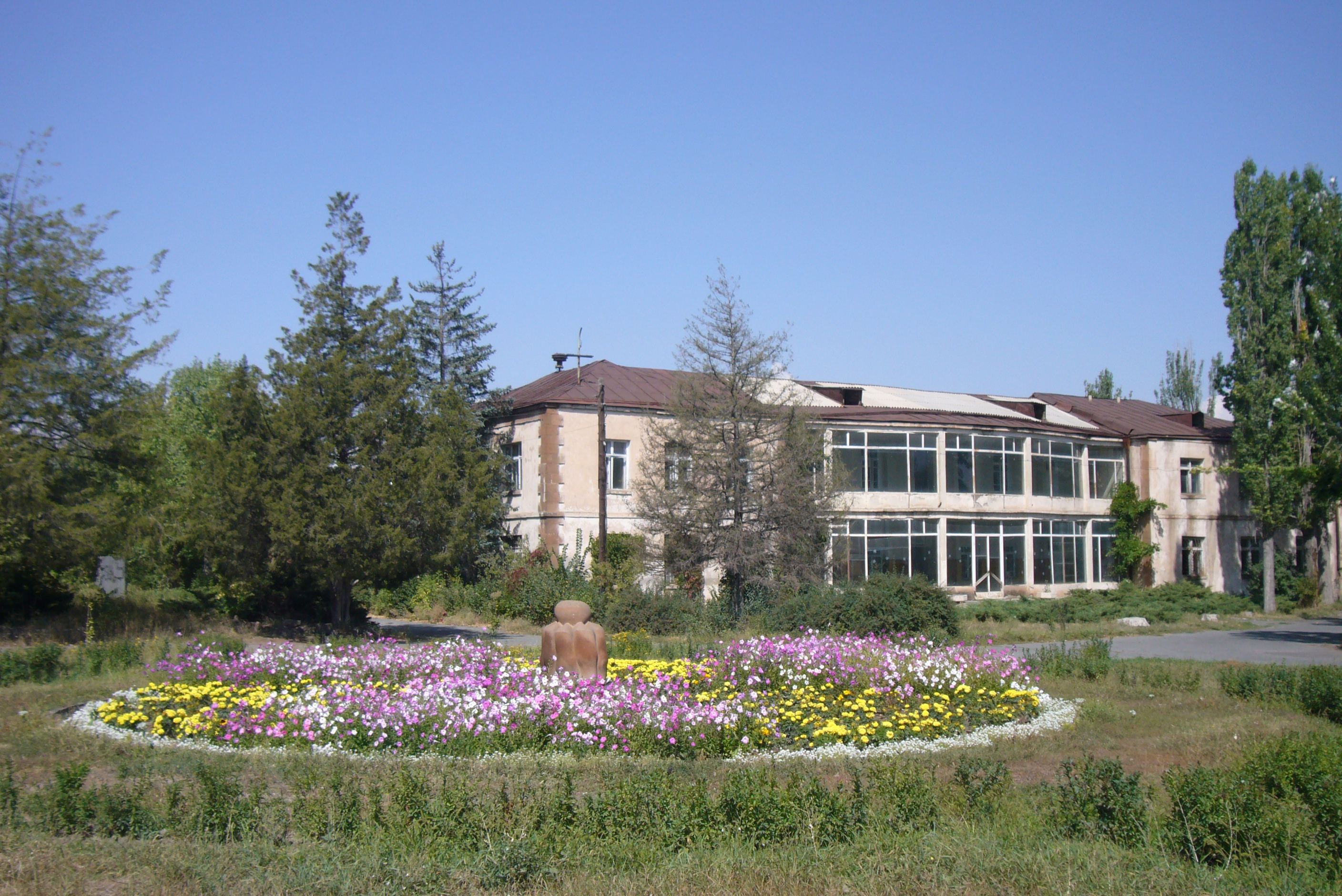
Yerevan Botanical Garden

The Yerevan Botanical Garden (Armenian: Երևանի բուսաբանական այգի, romanized: Yerevani busabanakan aygi) of the Armenian National Academy of Sciences, is the body responsible for plant collections in Armenia. It is located in the Avan district at the north-eastern part of the capital Yerevan, occupying around 80 hectares of a semi-deserted area. The collection includes more than 200 species of endemic, rare and declining plants, and provides a basis, in a relatively natural environment, for the study of the Armenian flora and the ecological interactions between plant species.

== History ==
The Yerevan Botanical Garden was opened in 1935 in the north-eastern part of Yerevan. The Institute of Botany was opened three years later in 1938. The collective greenhouse was founded in 1939 occupying 25 square meters. In 1944 a new greenhouse was built, the overall territory of which was 610 square meters. It included the winter garden (106 sq.m.) and sections devoted to succulent plants, subtropical plants (126 sq.m.), tropical plants (126 sq.m.) and houseplants. In 1950, the garden became the largest part of the Institute of Botany. In the period between 1954 and 1970, the Director of the Botanical Institute and the botanists L.B. Makhatadse and A.O. Mkrtchyan put together a large collection of the Caucasian flora, so that almost every plant species native to Armenia was represented in an area of approximately 16 hectares. At the same time, large rose and lily gardens were also created. In addition, there were more regions represented: the Caucasus, North America, Europe, Siberia and East Asia.

The majority of the species in the collection belong to the plant families Cupressaceae, Pinaceae, Fabaceae, Caprifoliaceae, Oleaceae and Rosaceae, and the genera Juniperus, Quercus, Syringa and Clematis are particularly well represented.

Plants grown in the park which are typical of the Caucasus include Quercus castaneifolia, Hedera helix, Corylus colurna, Juniperus sabina, Parrotia persica, and Populus euphratica.

The North American flora is represented by the species Liriodendron tulipifera, Juglans nigra, Catalpa bignonioides, Juniperus virginiana and Yucca filamentosa; that of Europe and Siberia by Aesculus hippocastanum, Cercis siliquastrum, Quercus robur and Larix sibirica and that of East Asia by Sophora japonica and Metasequoia glyptostroboides.

In 1980s the greenhouse collection encompassed 1240 species and garden varieties belonging to 348 classes and 92 families. In the winter garden they cultivated Washingtonia filifera, Syagrus romanzoffiana subtropical fruit-bearing plants like Feijoa sellowiana, Eucalyptus spp. and Laurus nobilis. The glasshouse collection was especially rich in succulent species. The fernery boasted rare and interesting species of the genera Platycerium, Asplenium, Adiantum and Pteris. The tropical plant section had a special subsection devoted to the family Orchidaceae, featuring a variety of species noted for their beauty and fragrance. The houseplant section featured indoor ornamentals noted for their attractive flowers and/or foliage, such as species and varieties of Begonia, Crinum, Clivia, Fuchsia, Nerium, Passiflora and Pelargonium. Close to the glasshouse range was a nursery area devoted to the production of over 200 species of tropical and subtropical house plants, specimens of which were distributed annually to schools, factories and other organizations to beautify them and contribute to the wellbeing of their pupils and workers.

== Objectives ==
The collection and cultivation of endangered plant species is a priority in the work of the garden (there are 452 rare and endangered plant species in Armenia). Of particular interest in this context are Taxus baccata, Hedera helix, Juniperus sabina, Zelkova carpinifolia and Rhododendron caucasicum. Another goal is environmental education. From the outset, scientists affiliated to the garden have made regular media appearances and written extensively of the challenges of environmental protection in Armenia. They also continue to offer advice to educational institutions, industry and private seed-suppliers. Field trips for school children are organized frequently, and are especially popular with students of agricultural biology. Research also continues into the influence of locality on plant growth, focussing on previously unexplained anomalies whereby certain woody species grow unnaturally fast in particular areas. The growth requirements of a large number of species, both native and non-native, have been studied in depth and these species have subsequently been established in successful plantings carried out in the vicinity of Lake Sevan.

== Current status ==
After the collapse of the Soviet Union the financial resources for the parks disappeared, and yet further damage was inflicted upon the garden by the Armenian energy crisis in 1992-1995, when many trees were cut down to be burnt as fuel for heating. At present, the specialists of the garden are in the process of repairing and restoring the garden and are expanding the existing collection. The glasshouses of the botanical garden currently house some 300 species of tropical and sub-tropical plants. Today there is a pressing need to restore the economy of the greenhouse and for this purpose it is necessary to implement the initiatives which are presented in the table below. The garden, forming a constituent part of the institute of Botany, is financed within the very limited base budget of the institute, yet, despite ongoing difficulties, it is continuing to fulfill its scientific and productive functions.

== Satellite gardens ==
=== Vanadzor Botanical Garden ===
The Botanical Garden of Vanadzor is located at the southern end of the town about 1400–1450 m above sea level. Thanks to its special climate, both native and non-native species are able to thrive there. Most of the species grown there belong to the families Pinaceae, Cupressaceae, Rosaceae, Caprifoliaceae, Salicaceae, Oleaceae and Fabaceae. Significantly involved in the creation of the collection were DG and P.D. Yaroshenko, L.B. Makhatadse and A.A. Grigorian.

=== Sevan Botanical Garden ===
The Botanical Garden of Sevan with an area of 5 hectares, is the smallest among the three parks. It is located very close to Lake Sevan, beside a small cove, well-protected from the wind, at the northern end of the town. Most of the plant species grown there belong to the families Rosaceae, Caprifoliaceae and Fabaceae.

== See also ==
- Vanadzor Botanical Garden
- Sevan Botanical Garden
- Ijevan Dendropark
- Stepanavan Dendropark
- Wildlife of Armenia
