= Tsakhkashen =

Tsakhkashen or Tsaghkashen or Tsaghkachen may refer to:

- Tsaghkashen, Aragatsotn, Armenia
- Tsaghkashen, Ararat, Armenia
- Tsaghkashen, Gegharkunik, Armenia
- Sizavet, Armenia, formerly Tsakhkashen
- Tsaghkaber, Armenia, formerly Tsakhkashen
