= Bekyand =

Bekyand may refer to:

- Anushavan, Armenia
- Mets Parni, Armenia
