= Gayane Yeganyan =

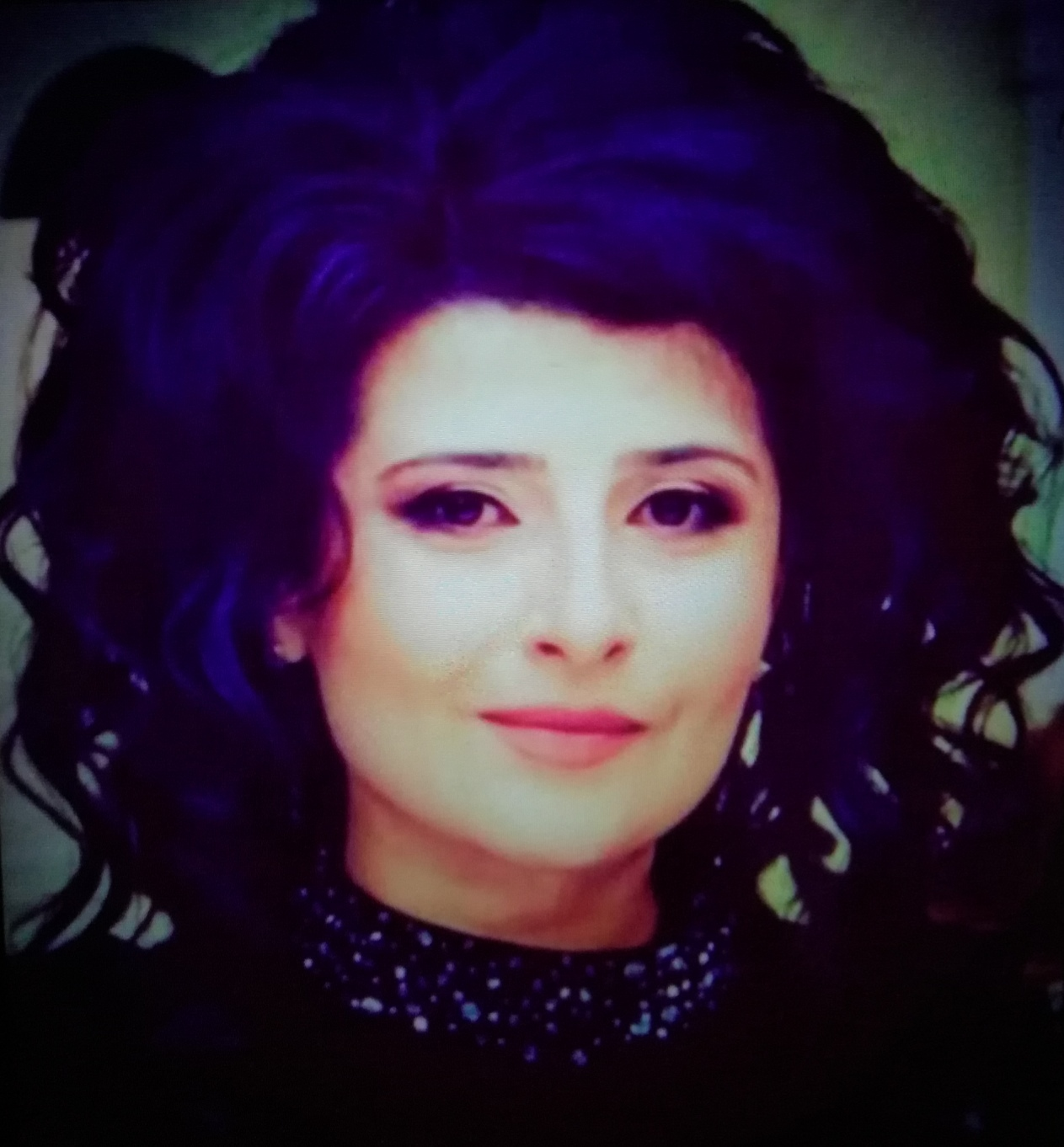
- Born: Tavush Marz, Koghb village
- Occupation: Pedagogy

Gayane Gagik Yeganyan, Candidate of Pedagogical Sciences. Gayane Yeganyan is the first to carry out research on pedagogical diagnostics in Armenian, as a result of which she has published 21 scientific articles.

== Academic courses ==
Gayane Yeganyan's BA certificate is Pedagogical Communication and Social pedagogy. She pursued her master's degree in pedagogical diagnostics, pedagogical validity, pedagogy of higher and vocational schools, pedagogical research methodology, and pedagogical anthropology.

== Education ==
Gayane Yeganyan in 2003–2008 she was a student in the Faculty of Primary and Special Education of ASPU after Khachadour Abovyan. Then, in 2009–2014, she was an applicant at the Department of Vocational Education and Applied Pedagogy (formerly Inter-Departmental) at the same university, after which she defended her PhD in 2015 and became a PhD in pedagogical sciences.

== Scholastic degree ==
Candidate of Pedagogical Sciences, specialty:13.00.01-History and Theory of Pedagogy (topic: "Theoretical and Methodological Analysis of Diagnostics in Pedagogy".

The dissertation defense was held on June 18, 2015 at Specialized scientific council: Specialized scientific council of pedagogy 020.

== Membership ==
- From 2012-2019 she was a member of the Trade Union of Armenian State Pedagogical University after Kh. Abovyan.
- From 2019 till now – member of trade union of Armenian State Pedagogical University after Kh. Abovyan and Chairman of trade union bureau of Chair of Professional education and applied pedagogy, Armenian State Pedagogical University after Kh. Abovyan.
- 2014–2019 Member of RA Presidential Public Council.

== Work experience ==
- Since 2012 – Lecturer of the Chair of Pedagogy, Armenian State Pedagogical University after Kh. Abovyan.
- 2012–2019 Lecturer in the Chair of Professional education and Applied Pedagogy, Armenian State Pedagogical University after Kh. Abovyan.
- 2009–2012 Lecturer of the Interfaculty Chair of Pedagogy.

== Trainings ==
On September 4–13, 2012, the Armenian State Pedagogical University after Khachatur Abovyan held a professional qualification training on "Theory, practice and management of inclusive education". The training was organized by the Center for Professional Qualification and Inter-University Cooperation and the Chair of Vocational Education and Applied Pedagogy. Gayane Yeganyan participated in this course and received a Certificate of Completion.

== Publications ==
=== Books ===
- Մանկավարժական դիագնոստիկա։ Ուսումնամեթոդական ձեռնարկ /Գ. Գ. Եգանյան.- Եր։ ՎՄՎ-Պրինտ, 2020.- 224 էջ։ (Pedagogical diagnostics. Educational-methodical manual / G. Գ. Yeganyan: Yer. VMV-Print, 2020.- 224 pages.)

=== Articles ===
1. Инновации в образовании и подготовка учителей" /Խ.Աբովյանի ծննդյան 200-ամյակին նվիրված պրոֆեսորադասախոսական անձնակազմի, ասպիրանտների, հայցորդների և գիտաշխատողների 54-րդ գիտաժողովի նյութեր, ՀՊՄՀ "Մանկավարժ", I պրակ, 2010թ./։ (Proceedings of the 54th Conference of Professors, PhD Students, Applicants and Researchers Dedicated to the 200th Anniversary of Kh. Abovyan, ASPU "Pedagogue", 1st Edition, 2010 /.)
2. "Ինտեգրման գործընթացի հոգեբանամանկավարժական վերլուծությունը տարրական դպրոցում" /"Հոգեբանությունը և կյանքը" N 1–2, 2011թ./։ ("Psycho-pedagogical Analysis of the Integration Process in Elementary School" / "Psychology and Life" N 1–2, 2011 /.)
3. "Մանկավարժական դիագնոստիկայի էությունը և գործառույթները" /"Մանկավարժական միտք", N 3–4, 2012թ./։ ("The Essence and Functions of Pedagogical Diagnostics" / "Pedagogical Thought", N 3–4, 2012 /.)
4. "Դիզայնի դասավանդման բովանդակությունը և մեթոդիկան" /"Գեղարվեստական միտք ", 2012թ./։ ("Design Teaching Content and Methodology" / "Art Thought", 2012 /.)
5. "Դպրոցին` նախադպրոցականի պատրաստվածության հայտորոշման առանձնահատկությունները" /"Նախաշավիղ", N 3, 2012թ./։ ("At School: Peculiarities of Preschool Readiness Assessment" / "Nashashavig", N 3, 2012 /.)
6. «Հանրակրթական դպրոցում մանկավարժական վերահսկողության իրականացման առանձնահատկությունները» /«Մխիթար Գոշ», 4–6, 2013թ./։ ("Peculiarities of Implementation of Pedagogical Supervision in the Secondary School" / "Mkhitar Gosh", 4–6, 2013 /.)
7. «Մանկաբանության ծագումն ու զարգացումը մանկավարժական դիագնոստիկայի տիրույթում» /«Մխիթար Գոշ», 10–12, 2013թ./։ ("The Origin and Development of Pedagogy in the Domain of Pedagogical Diagnostics" / "Mkhitar Gosh", 10–12, 2013 /.)
8. «Մանկավարժական դիագնոստիկայի ձևավորման հիմքերն ու զարգացման փուլերը» /«Մանկավարժական միտք», N 1–2, 2014/։ ("Fundamentals of Pedagogical Diagnostics and Development Stages" / Pedagogical Thought, N 1–2, 2014 /.)
9. "Բարձրագույն մանկավարժական կրթության համակարգում "մանկավարժական դիագնոստիկա" դասընթացի անհրաժեշտությունը" /Բանբեր Երևանի Վ․Բրյուսովի անվան պետական լեզվահասարակագիտական համալսարանի։ Մանկավարժություն և հասարակական գիտություններ։ 2(31) – Երևան, Լինգվա, 2014/։ ("The Need for a Pedagogical Diagnostics Course in the System of Higher Pedagogical Education" / Banber of Yerevan State Linguistic and Social Sciences University after V.Brysov. Pedagogy and Social Sciences. 2 (31) – Yerevan, Lingua, 2014 /.)
10. "Դիագնոստիկ գործընթացը մանկավարժի արդյունավետ գործունեության նախապայման" /Թեզիսներ, "Մանկավարժության ժամանակակից հիմնախնդիրները", ԵՊՀ, Տարածաշրջանային միջազգային գիտաժողովի, հոկտեմբերի 17–18, 2014/։ ("The Diagnostic Process as a Prerequisite for Effective Pedagogical Activity" / Abstracts, "Contemporary Issues of Pedagogy", YSU, International Regional Conference, October 17–18, 2014 /.)
11. "Возможности применения педагогической диагностики в работе учителя по осуществлению профессиональной ориентации" /"Կրթության որակի չափման, գնահատման հիմնախնդիրները", ՀՊՄՀ, Միջազգային գիտաժողովի նյութերի ժողովածու․-Եր։ Մանկավարժ, 2015/։ ("The Problems of Measuring and Assessing the Quality of Education", ASPU, Proceedings of the International Conference Proceedings – Yerevan. Teacher, 2015 /.)
12. "Դիագնոստիկան մանկավարժական գործունեության արդյունավետության նախապայման"/ Կրթության ժամանակակից հիմնախնդիրները. Երիտասարդ գիտնականների ամառային դպրոցի մասնակիցների հեղինակային նախագծերի ժողովածու. –Եր.։ Մանկավարժ, 2016/։ ("Diagnostics Prerequisite for Effectiveness of Pedagogical Activity" / Contemporary Issues in Education. A Collection of Author Projects for Young Scientists Summer School -S.. Teacher, 2016 /.)
13. "Մանկավարժական դիագնոստիկայի հիմնահարցը տարրական դպրոցում"/ Կրթության ժամանակակից հիմնախնդիրները. Երիտասարդ գիտնականների ամառային դպրոցի մասնակիցների հեղինակային նախագծերի ժողովածու. –Եր.։ Մանկավարժ, 2016/։ ("The Problem of Pedagogical Diagnostics in Elementary School" / Contemporary Issues in Education. A Collection of Author Projects for Young Scientists Summer School -S.. Teacher, 2016 /.)
14. "Ավագ դպրոցականի արժեքային կողմնորոշման հիմնահարցը ընտանիքի և դպրոցի համագործակցության համատեքստում"/ Մանկության հիմնախնդիրները ժամանակակից հայ ընտանիքում, 21-րդ դարի մարտահրավերները. կանխման և հաղթահարման ուղիները" գիտաժողովի նյութերի ժողովածու, -Եր։ Մանկավարժ, 2016/։ ("The Problem of High School Student Orientation in the Context of Family and School Collaboration" / Childhood Problems in the Modern Armenian Family, Challenges of the 21st Century. Ways to Prevent and Overcome "Conference Proceedings," That. Teacher, 2016 /.)
15. "Մանկավարժական դիագնոստիկայի հիմնախնդիրը Հովհաննես Հինդլյանի մանկավարժական համակարգում"/§Մխիթար Գոշ¦ գիտամեթոդական հանդես, 2(45), 2016/։ ("The Problem of Pedagogical Diagnostics in Hovhannes Hindlian's Pedagogical System" / "Mkhitar Gosh" Scientific and Methodological Journal, 2 (45), 2016 /.9
16. "Влияние телевидения на формирование духовно-нравственных ценностей у учащихся"/ Международная научно-практическая конференция X Международные научные чтения (памяти А.М. Бутлерова), г. Москва, 2017/.
17. "Դիագնոստիկ աշխատանքն իբրև դաստիարակության գործընթացի անհրաժեշտ պայման"/ "Մխիթար Գոշ", գիտամեթոդական հանդես, 2(47), 2017/. ("Diagnostic Work as a Necessary Condition for the Education Process" / "Mkhitar Gosh", Methodological Journal, 2 (47), 2017 /.)
18. " Диагностика как важная составляющая компетенций педагога"/ Koenig L. (Ed.) (2018). Humanities and Social Sciences in Europe։ Achievements and Perspectives. The 1st International symposium proceedings (January 25, 2018), Premier Publishing s.r.o. Berlin. 2018/.
19. "Культура визитная карточка каждого народа"/ Национальная ассоциация ученых (НАУ) # 36, г. Екатеринбург, 2018/։
20. "Գուրգեն Էդիլյանի մանկավարժական հայացքների ժամանակակից մեկնությունը"/ Հայ մանկավարժության երախտավորները ժամանակակից ման կավարժական մոտեցումների համաբնագրում։ Հանրապետական գիտաժողովի զեկուցումների և գիտական հոդվածների ժողովածու, -Եր.։ Արտագերս, 2018/։ ("The Modern Interpretation of Gurgen Edilyan's Pedagogical Views" / A Commentary on Armenian Pedagogy Contemporary Pedagogical Approaches. A Collection of Reports and Scientific Articles of the Republican Conference, Outside, 2018 /.9
21. "Культура семейного чтения как способ сохранения этнических особенностей"/ Воспитательный потенциал семейного чтения в эпоху цифровизации и глобализации։ материалы Международной научно-практической конференции (19–20 сентября 2019 г.). – Казань։ Изд-во Казан. ун-та,– 441 с., /РИНЦ/, 2019/։
22. Культура семейного чтения как способ сохранения этнических особенностей, Воспитательный потенциал семейного чтения в эпоху цифровизации и глобализации: материалы Международной научно-практической конференции (19-20 сентября 2019 г.). – Казань: Изд-во Казан. ун-та,– 441 с., /РИНЦ/, 2019, с. 17-22
23. Diagnostics as a precondition of value orientation in primary school. Khachatur Abovian Armenian State Pedagogical University, Scientific Periodical, Main Issues Of Pedagogy And Psychology, 2020(2), pp. 76–82
24. Հալէպի ազգային Քարէն Եփփէ ճեմարանի դերը համայնքի հայապահպանման գործին մէջ, «Կրթությունը 21-րդ դարում» Գիտամեթոդական միջազգային գրախոսվող հանդես: ԵՊՀ Մանկավարժության և կրթության զարգացման կենտրոն, Թիվ 2(4), 2020, Երևան, Էջ 229-239
25. Մեդիայի դերը տարրական դպրոցի ուսումնական գործընթացում, Մեդիանեխնոլոգիաները տարրական դպրոցի մանկավարժական գործընթացում։ Ուսումնամեթոդական ձեռնարկ մակավարժների և ծնողների համար /Թոփուզյան Ա. Օ., Գյուլամիրյան Ջ. Հ., Պողոսյան Լ. Մ., Ասատրյան Ս.Մ.,Երևան, «Մանկավարժ» հրատ., 2020, 168 էջ։
