= Sevanavank =

Monastery in Armenia

- Սևանավանք
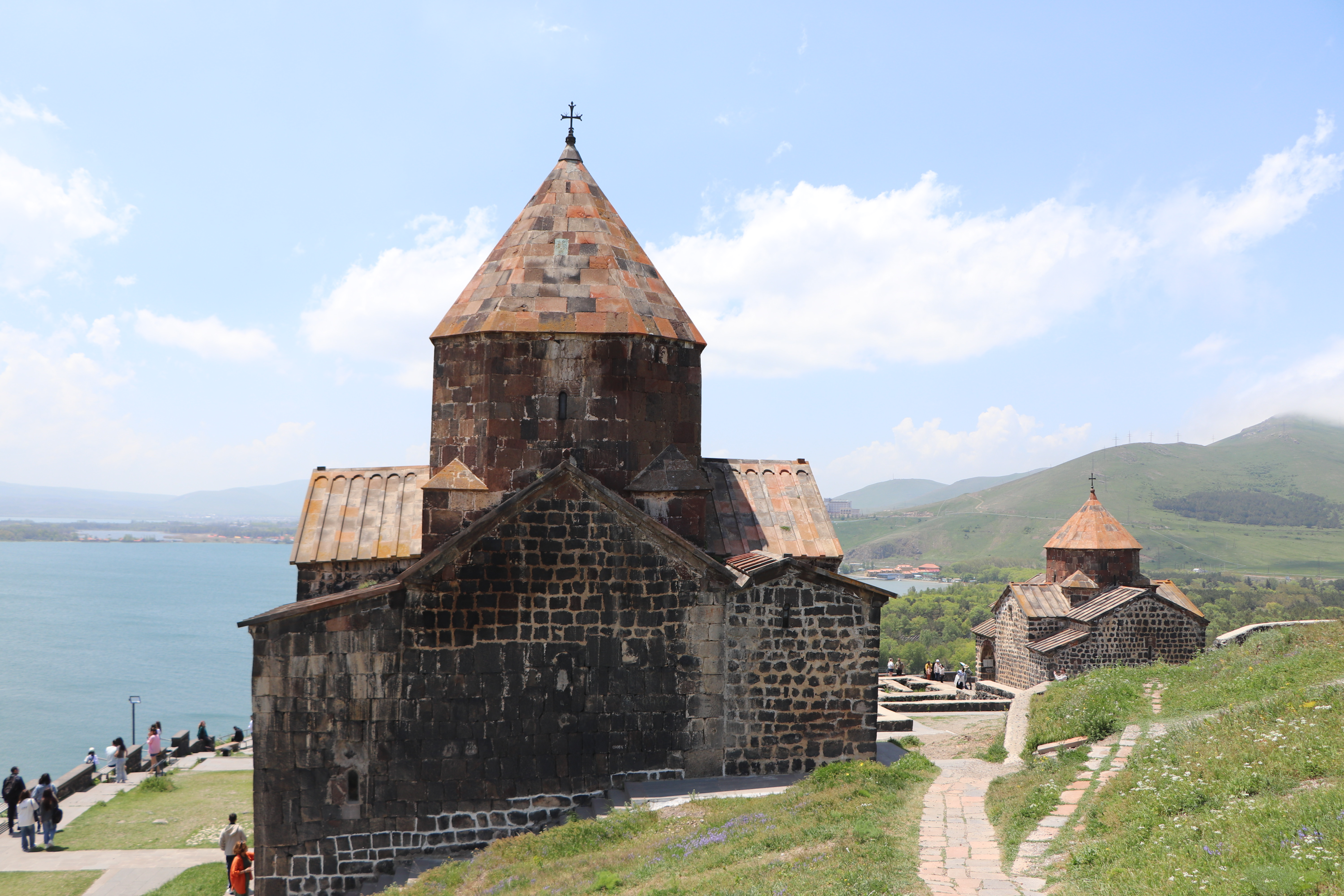
- The churches of Surp Arakelots (left) and Surp Astvatsatsin (right)

- Location within Armenia Location within Gegharkunik

Religion
- Affiliation: Armenian Apostolic Church
- Status: Active

Location
- Location: Sevan Peninsula, Lake Sevan, Armenia
- Coordinates: 40.563917°N 45.010808°E

Architecture
- Style: Armenian
- Completed: 9th century

Sevanavank (Armenian: Սևանավանք; meaning Sevan Monastery) is a monastic complex located on a peninsula at the northwestern shore of Lake Sevan in the Gegharkunik Province of Armenia, not far from the town of Sevan. Initially the monastery was built at the southern shore of a small island. After the artificial draining of Lake Sevan, which started in the era of Joseph Stalin, the water level fell about 20 metres, and the island transformed into a peninsula. At the southern shore of this newly created peninsula, a guesthouse of the Writers Union of Armenia was built. The eastern shore is occupied by the Armenian president's summer residence, while the monastery's still active seminary moved to newly constructed buildings at the northern shore of the peninsula.

Due to easier accessibility (once it became a peninsula), good highway and railway connections with the Armenian capital Yerevan, a well-developed tourist industry in the nearby town of Sevan, and its picturesque location (although less picturesque than it was before the lake level drop), Sevanavank is one of the most visited tourist sights in Armenia.

== History ==
According to an inscription in one of the churches, the monastery of Sevanavank was founded in 874 by Princess Mariam, the daughter of Ashot I (who became a king a decade later). At the time, Armenia was still struggling to free itself from Arab rule.

The monastery was strict as it was mainly intended for those monks from Etchmiadzin who had sinned. Jean-Marie Chopin, a French explorer of the Caucasus, visited there in 1830 and wrote of a regimen restraining from meat, wine, youth or women. Another explorer visited the monastery in 1850 and wrote of how manuscripts were still being copied manually.

== Architecture ==
The two churches of the complex, Surp Arakelots meaning the "Holy Apostles" and Surp Astvatsatsin meaning the "Holy Mother of God", are both cruciform plan structures with octagonal tambours. The two are quite similar to each other in appearance. Adjacent are the ruins of a gavit whose roof was originally supported by six wooden columns. Some of the remains of the gavit and its columns can be seen in the Yerevan Museum of History.

Reconstruction and restoration efforts took place from 1956 to 1957.

== Gallery ==
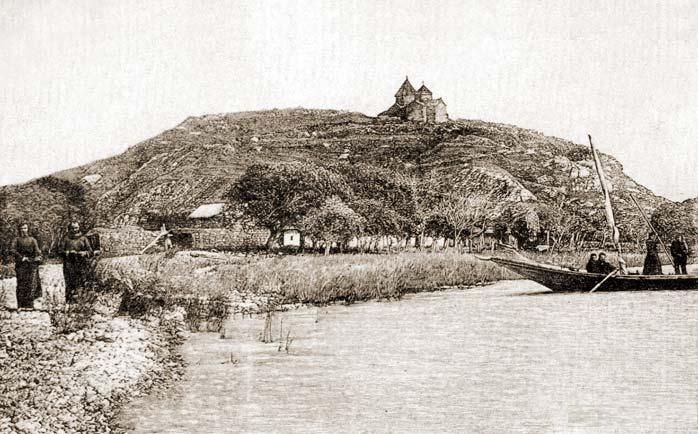
The island and the Sevan Monastery during the 19th century (Paris, 1869, T. Deyrolle)

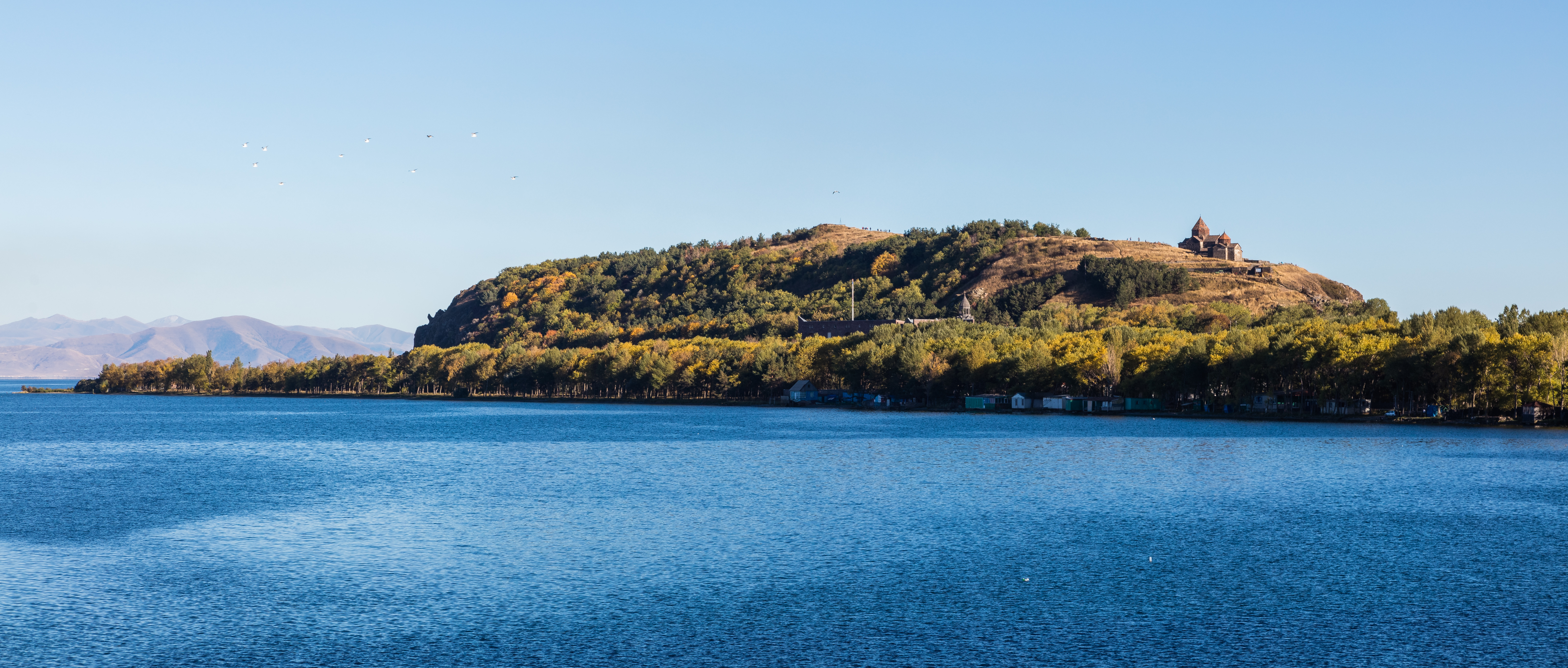
Sevanavank and peninsula along Lake Sevan

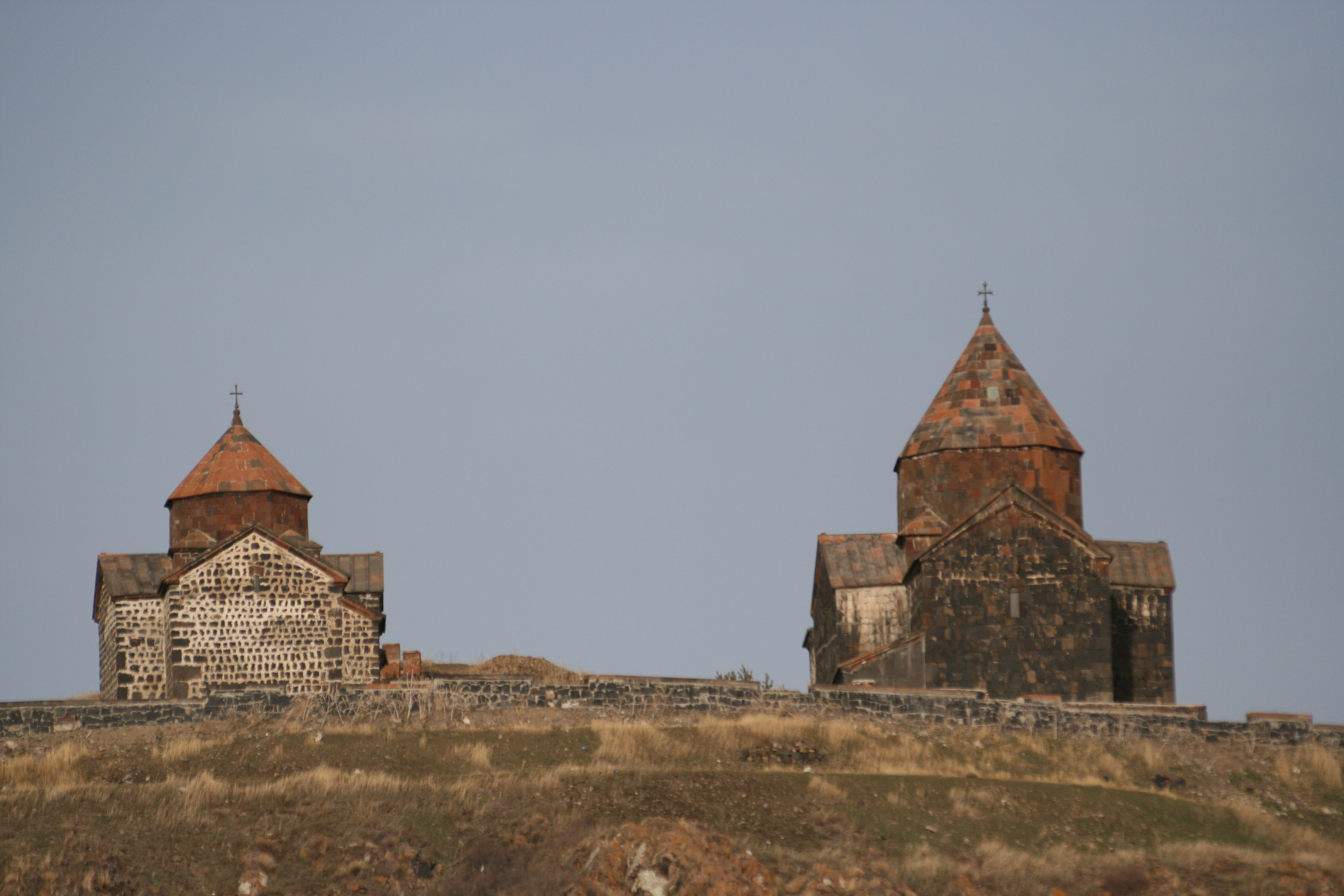
Sevanavank monastery viewed from the lake

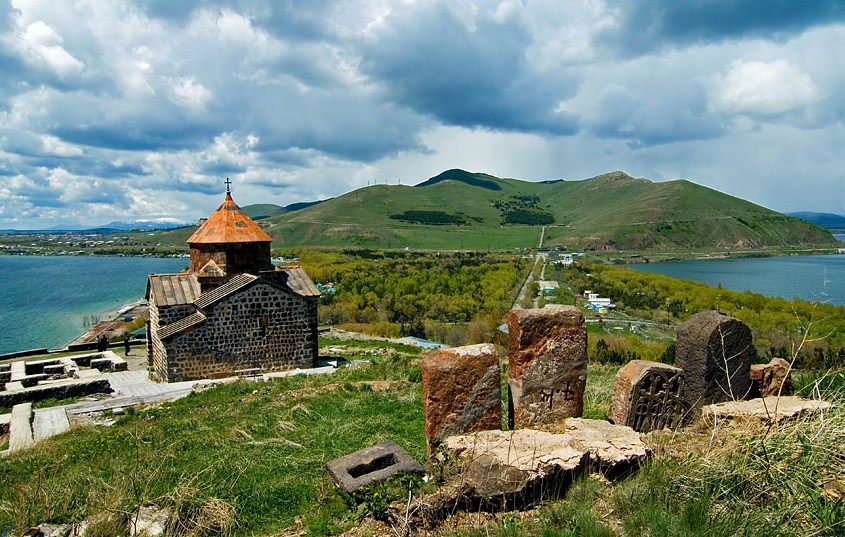
View of the peninsula

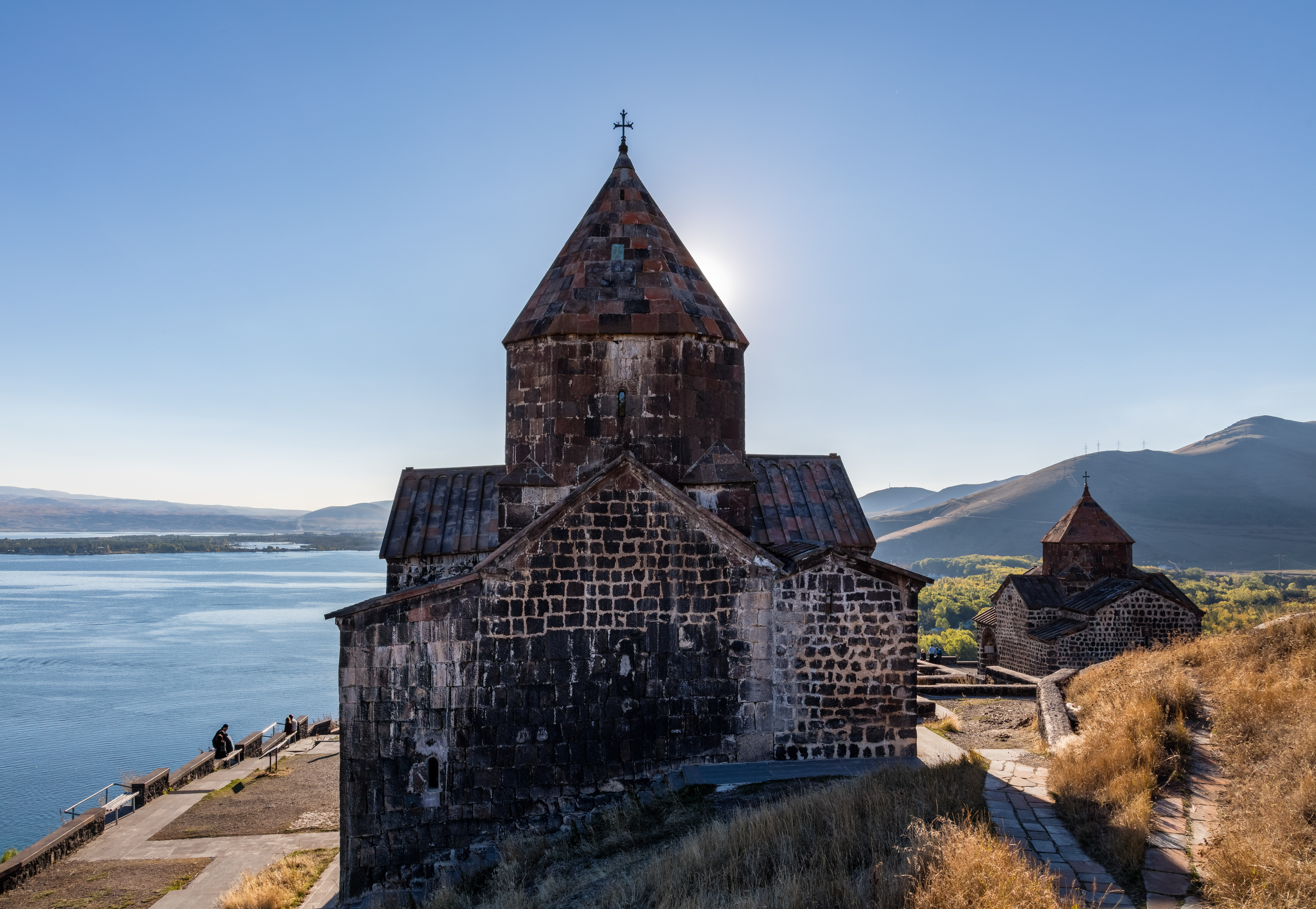
Surp Arakelots church

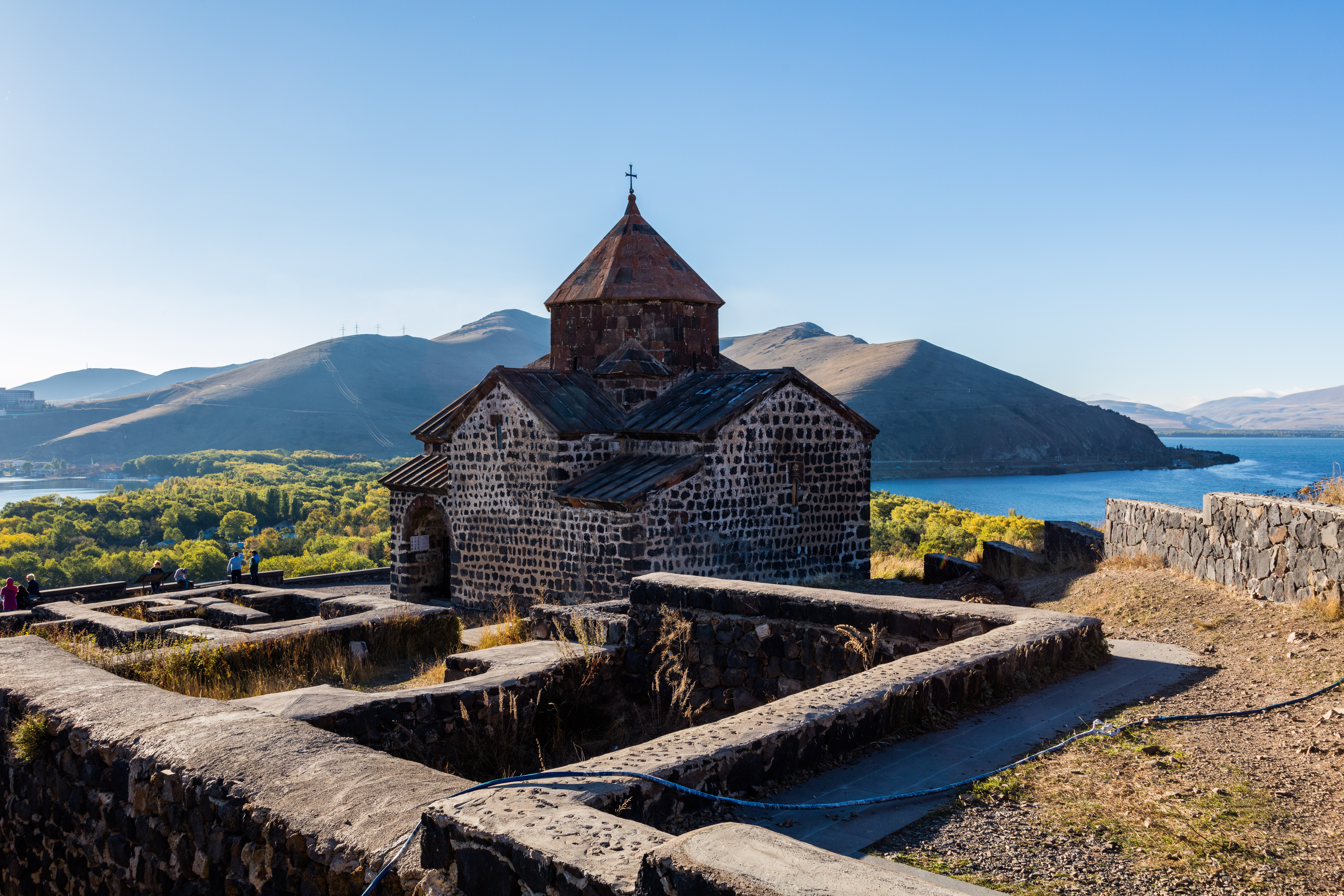
Surp Arakelots church

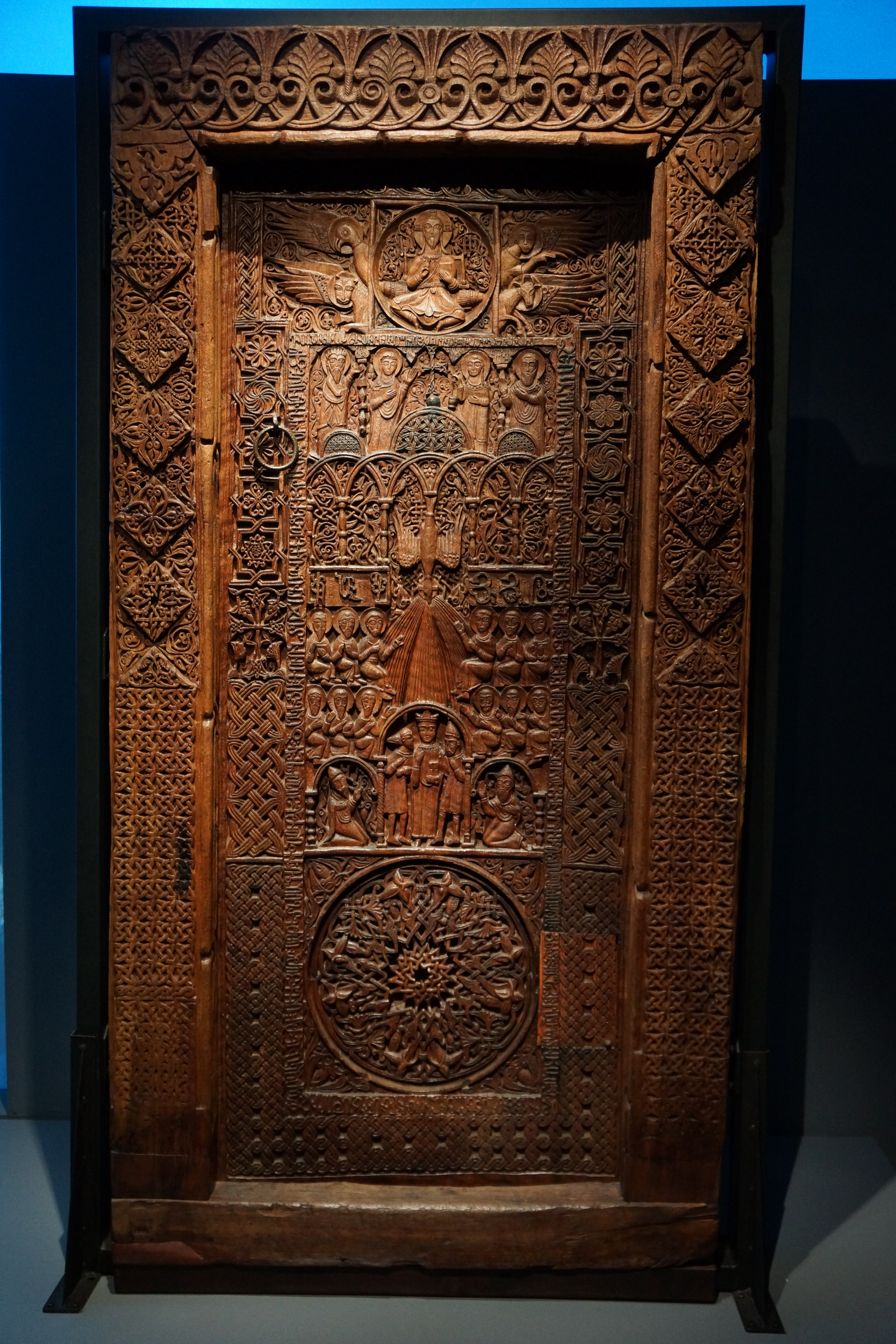
Carved walnut wood door (1486) from the Church of the Holy Apostles, Lake Sevan.

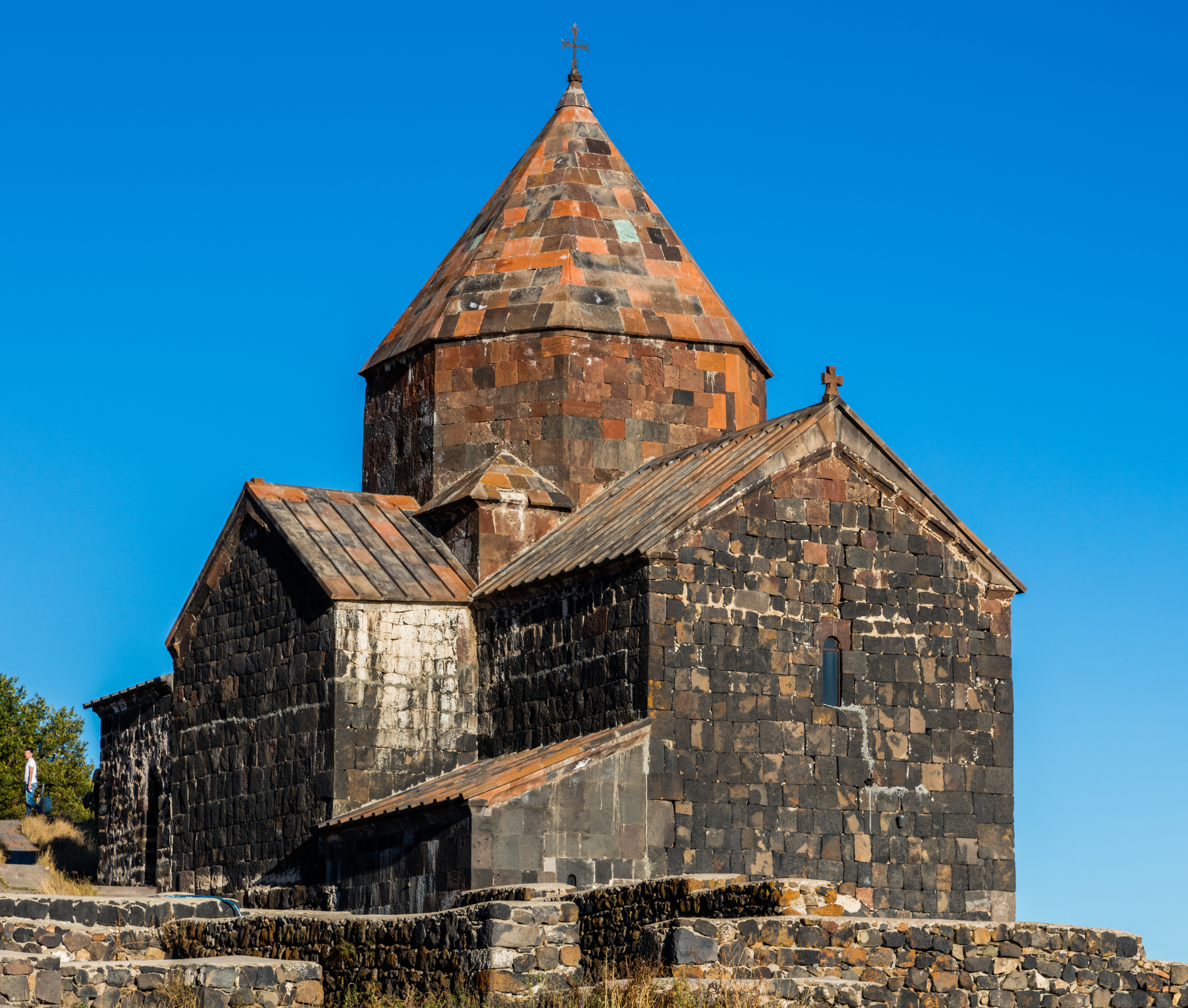
Surp Astvatsatsin church

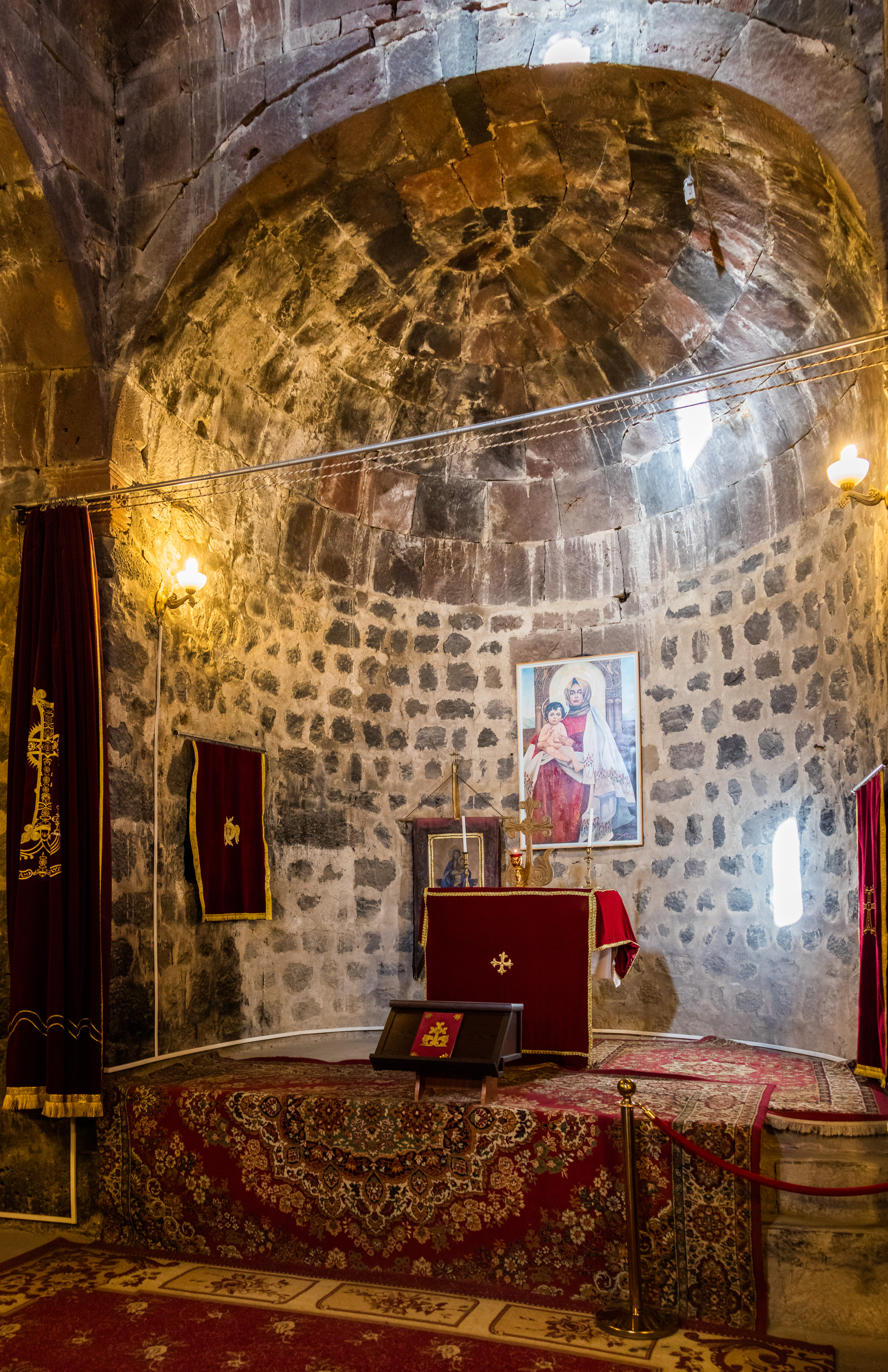
Altar of Surp Arakelots

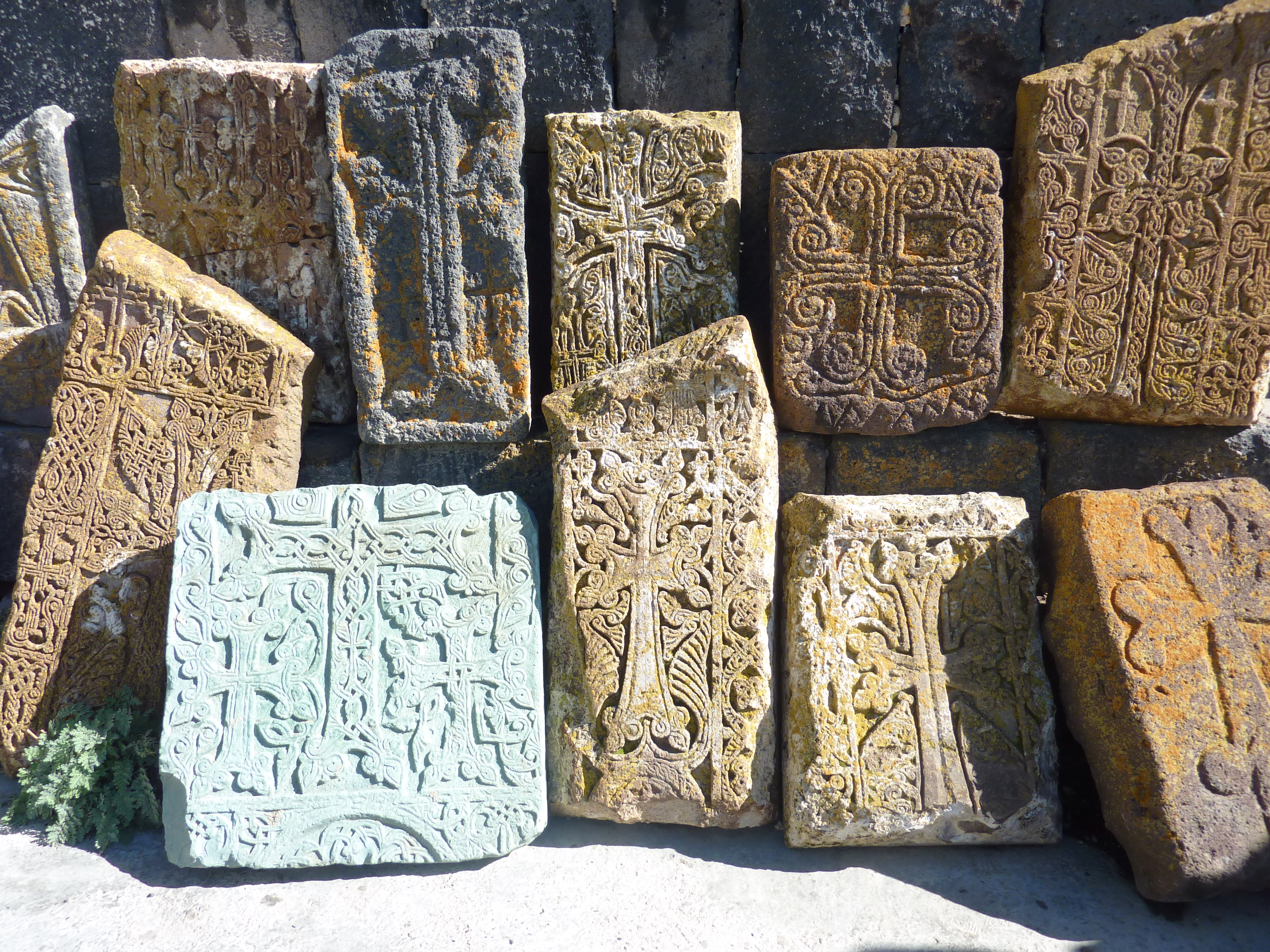
Khachkars along the ruins of the gavit

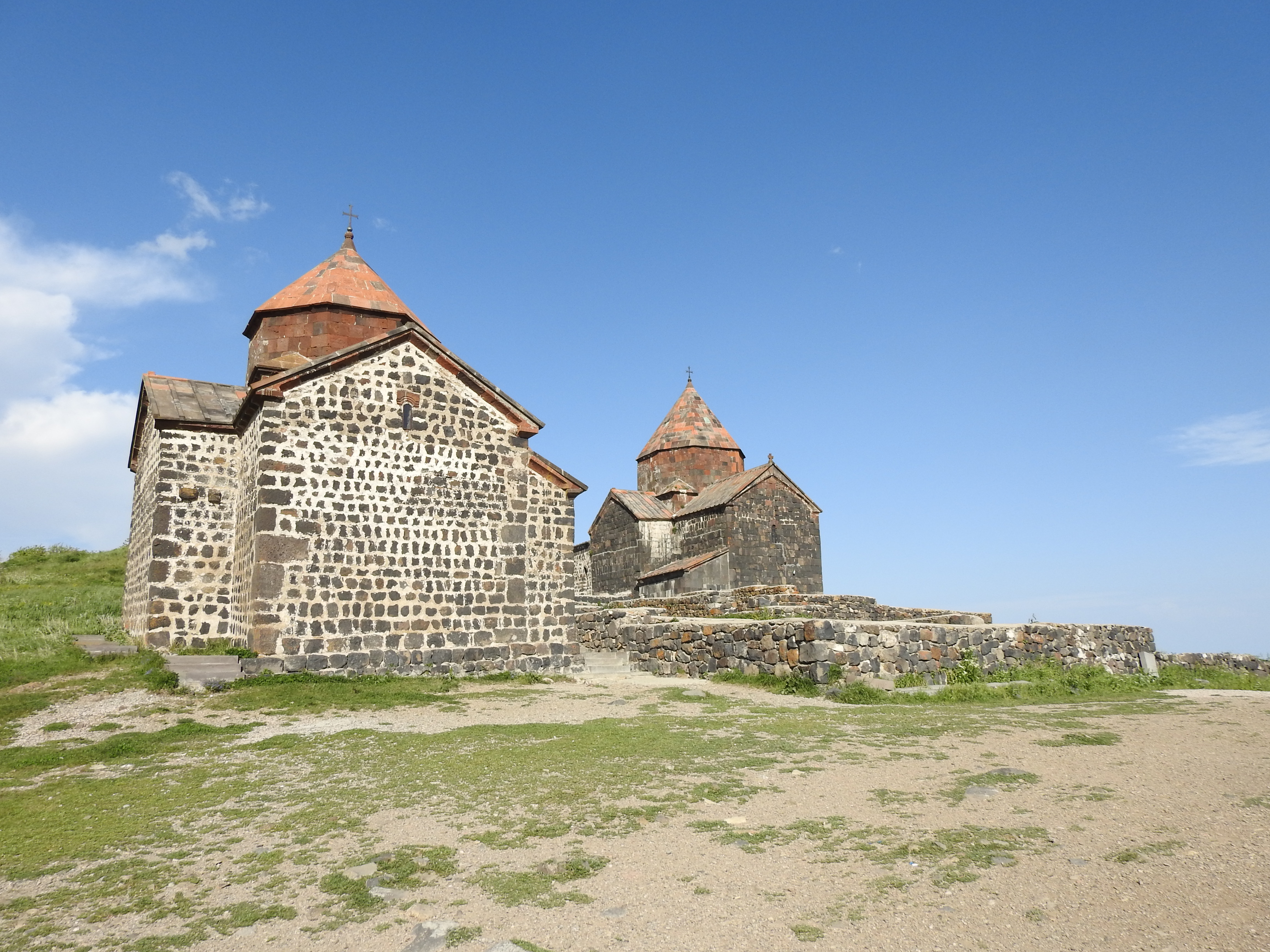
Church of Surb Arakelots and Church Astvatsatsin

Sourp Astvatsatsin (also Saint Araqelots church)
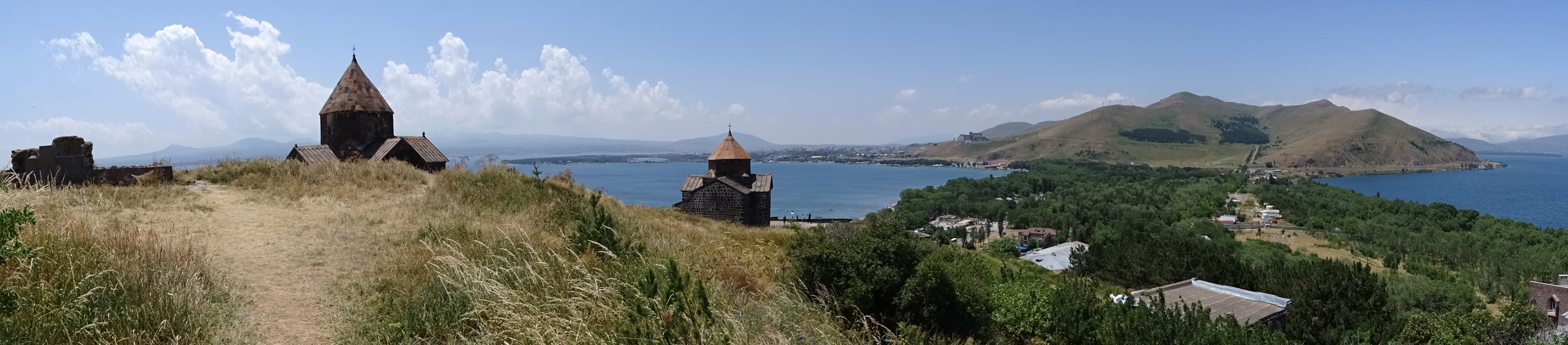
Panoramic view of the Sevan Peninsula
