= Koghb =

Koghb may refer to:

- Koghb, Armenia
- Tuzluca, Turkey
