= Razmik Davoyan =

Armenian poet (1940–2022)

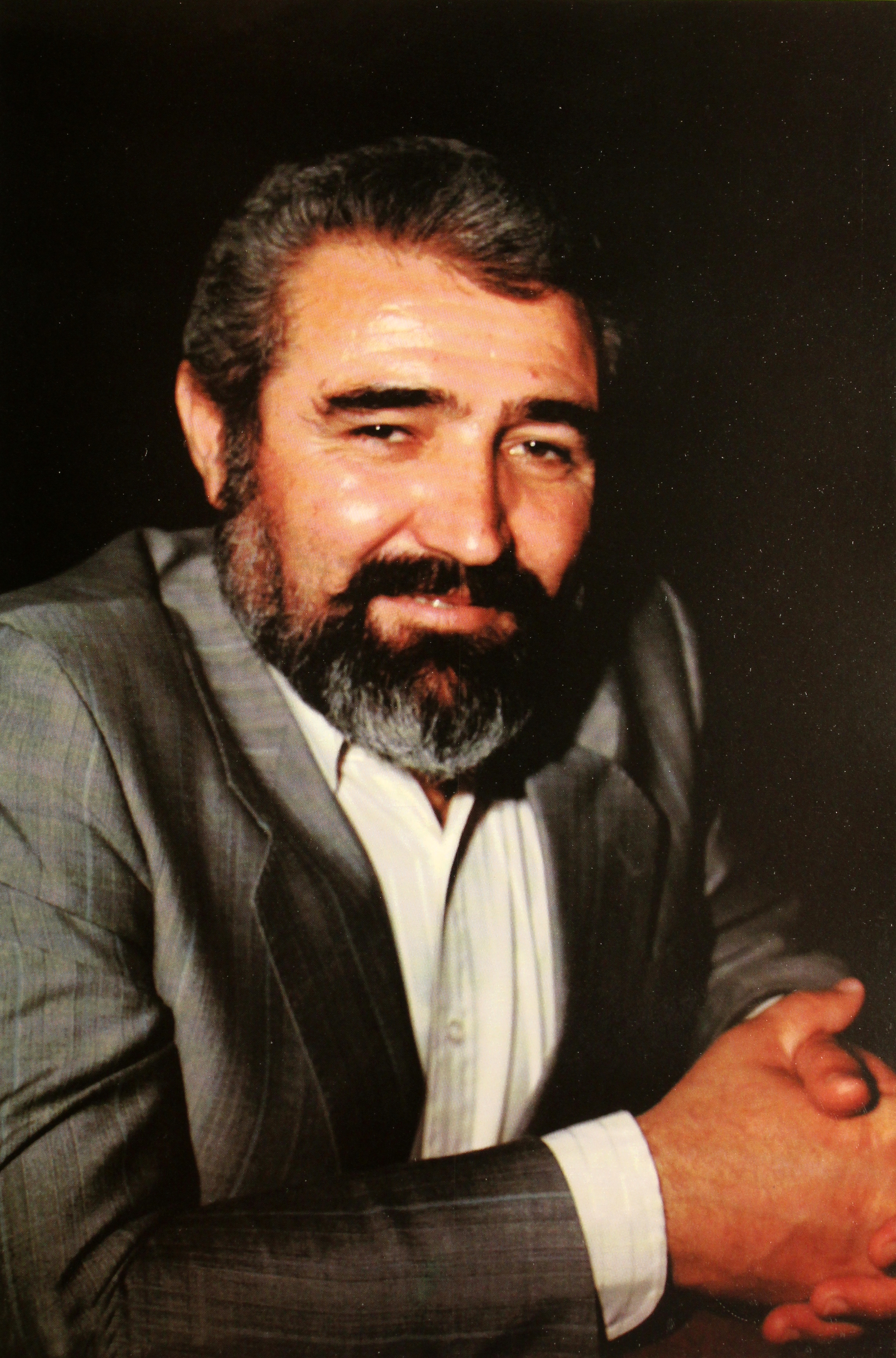
- Born: 3 July 1940; Mets Parni, Armenian SSR, Soviet Union
- Died: 11 January 2022 (aged 81)
- Education: Armenian State Pedagogical University
- Occupation: Poet
- Spouses: Hasmik Mashinyan (m. 1964; div. 1996) Armine Tamrazian (m. 1996)

Razmik Davoyan (Armenian: Ռազմիկ Դավոյան; 3 July 1940 – 11 January 2022) was an Armenian poet.

== Life and career ==
Davoyan was born in Mets Parni, Spitak rayon, Armenian SSR on 3 July 1940. He studied philology and history at Armenian State Pedagogical University.

He published a number of poetry collections (My world, 1963; Massacre of the Crosses, 1972; The sad elephant, 1978). His poem "Requiem" (1969) is dedicated to the darkest pages of the history of the Armenian people. Davoyan's famous poems include "Unwrap your skin", "The spider", and "After Narekatsi". Davoyan's works were subject to censorship by Soviet authorities. Requiem, Massacre of the Crosses, and Toros Rosslin were blocked from publication for a number of years, the latter two eventually being published outside of Armenia. Much of his work has been translated into English, Russian, and Czech.

In 1971 he received the Prize of Armenian Komsomol. In 1986 he received Armenia's State Prize for Literature. From 1994 to 1996 he was the head of the Writers Union of Armenia. A year later, he was the recipient of the Order of St. Mesrop Mashtots from the President of Armenia. In 2003, The Little Bird at the Exhibition, a children's book written by Davoyan, was awarded the President's Prize for Literature.

Davoyan resided in Yerevan, Armenia. He died on 11 January 2022, at the age of 81.

== Books ==
- Selected Poems, Macmillan UK, Oxford, 2002.
- Whispers and Breath of the Meadows, Arc Publications UK, 2010.
