= Sevan Island =

Island in Armenia

Sevan Island / Սևանի կղզի Sevan Peninsula / Սևանի թերակղզի
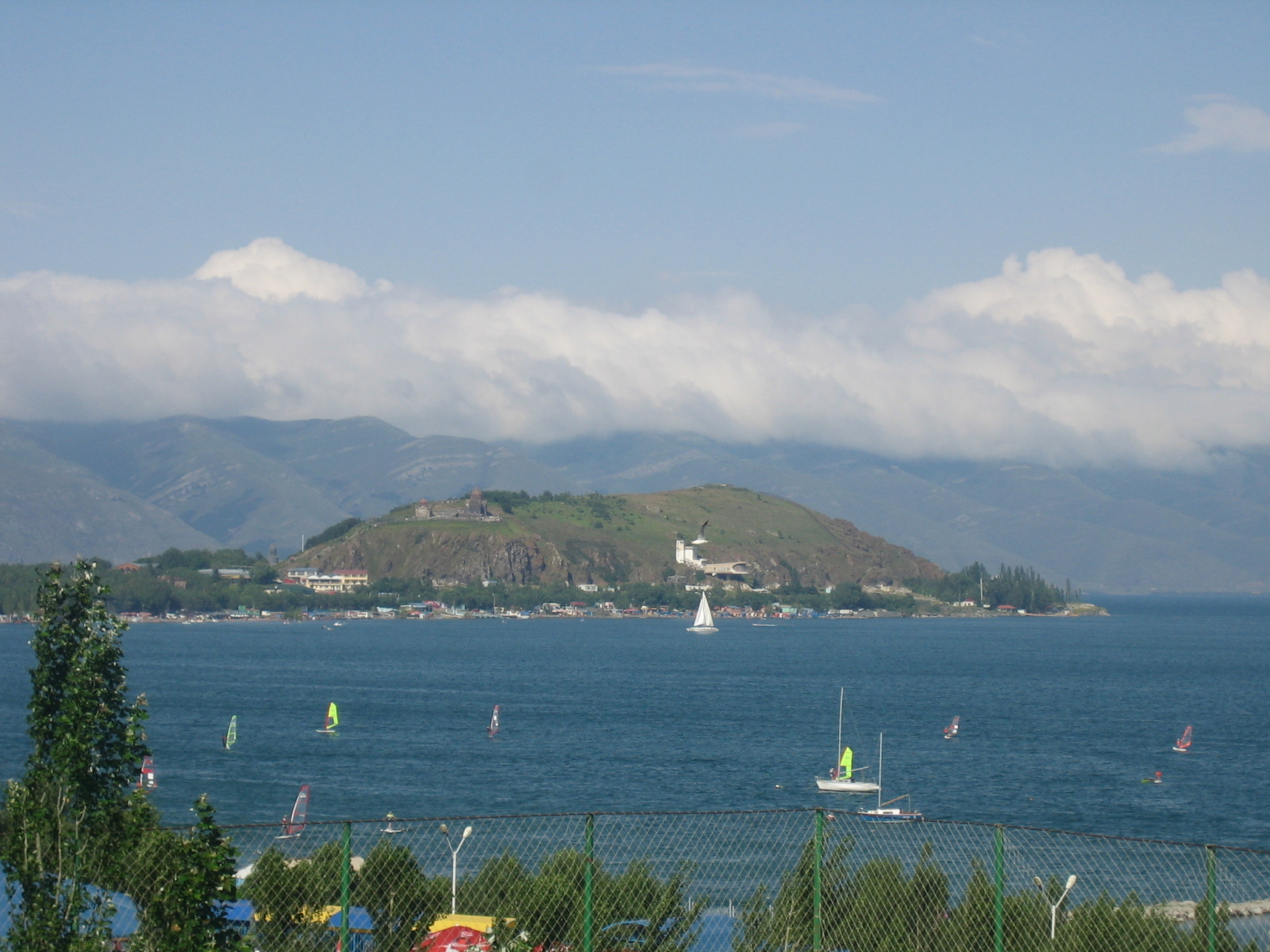
- Sevan Peninsula from afar.
- Interactive map of Sevan Island / Սևանի կղզի Sevan Peninsula / Սևանի թերակղզի

Geography
- Location: Gegharkunik Province, Armenia
- Coordinates: 40°33′51″N 45°00′53″E
- Highest elevation: 1,950 m (6400 ft)

Sevan Island (Armenian: Սևանի կղզի Sevani kğzi), now Sevan Peninsula (Armenian: Սևանի թերակղզի Sevani t'erakğzi), is a former island in the north-western part of Lake Sevan in Armenia. After the artificial draining of Lake Sevan, which started in the Stalin era, the water level fell about 20 metres, and the island transformed into a peninsula. At the southern shore of this newly created peninsula, a guesthouse of the Writers Union of Armenia was built. The eastern shore is occupied by the Armenian president's summer residence, while the monastery's still active seminary moved to newly constructed buildings at the northern shore of the peninsula.

Sevan Island is home to a ninth-century Armenian Cathedral church, known as Sevanavank, which is one of the most visited tourist attractions in Armenia.

== Gallery ==
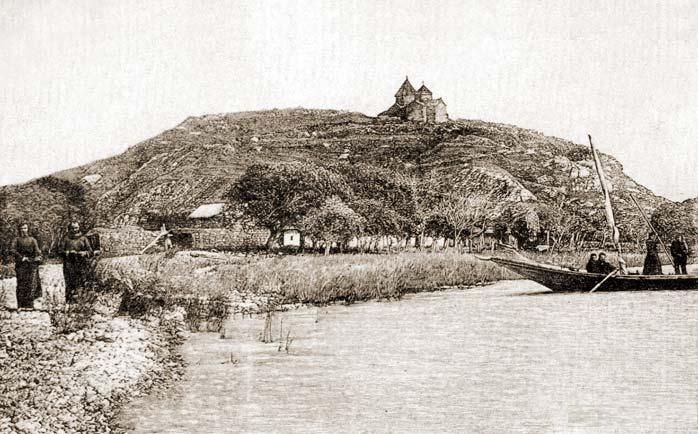
The island and the monastery of Sevan during the 19th century (Paris, 1869, T. Deyrolle)

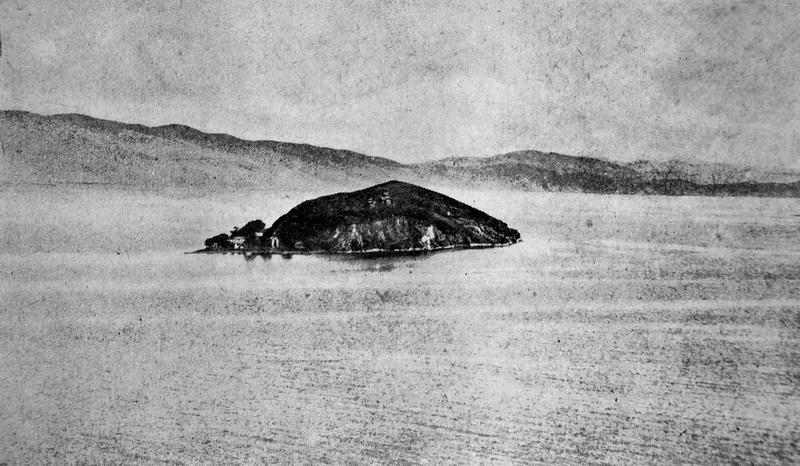
Sevan Island in 1937

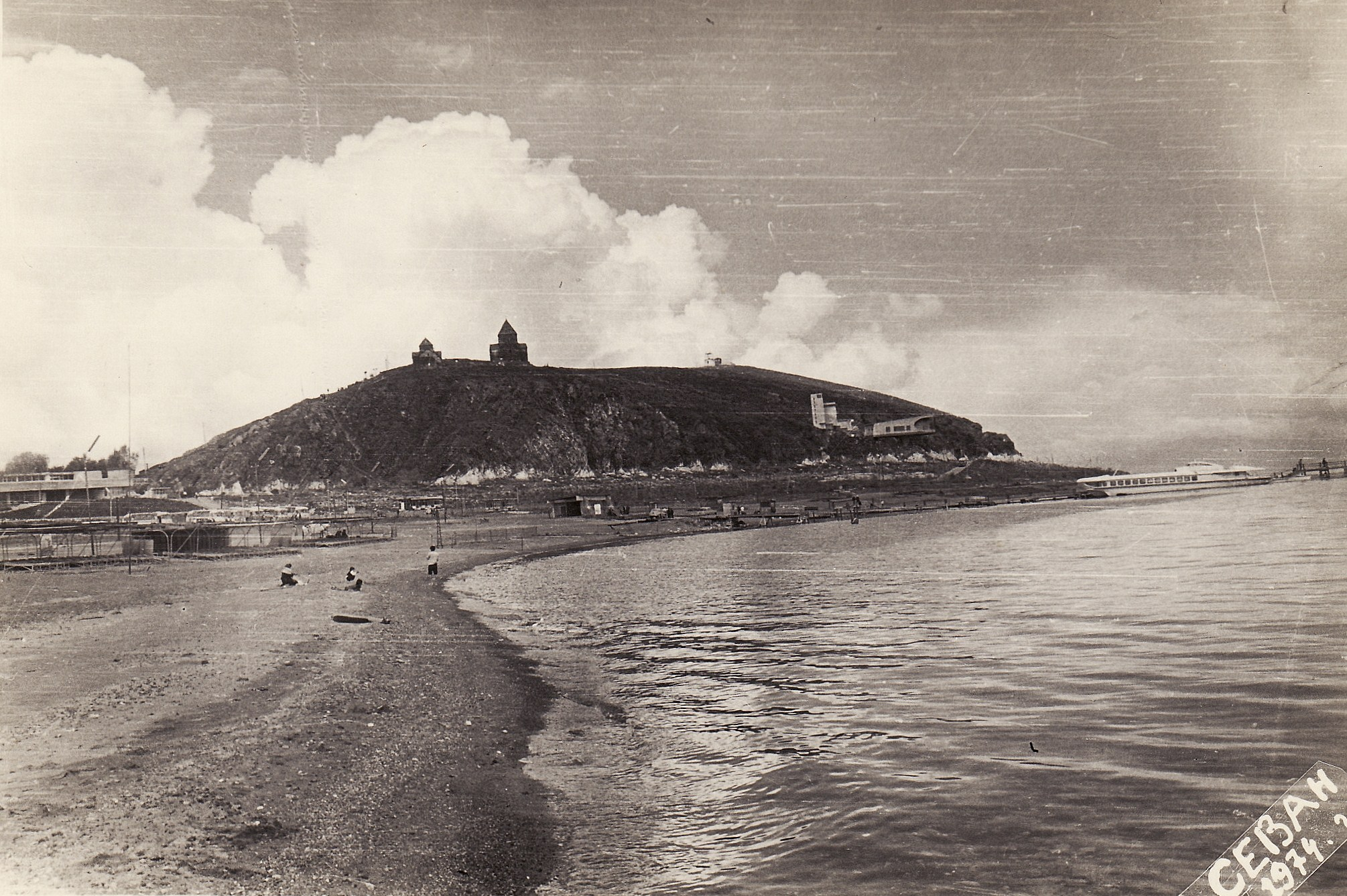
1974

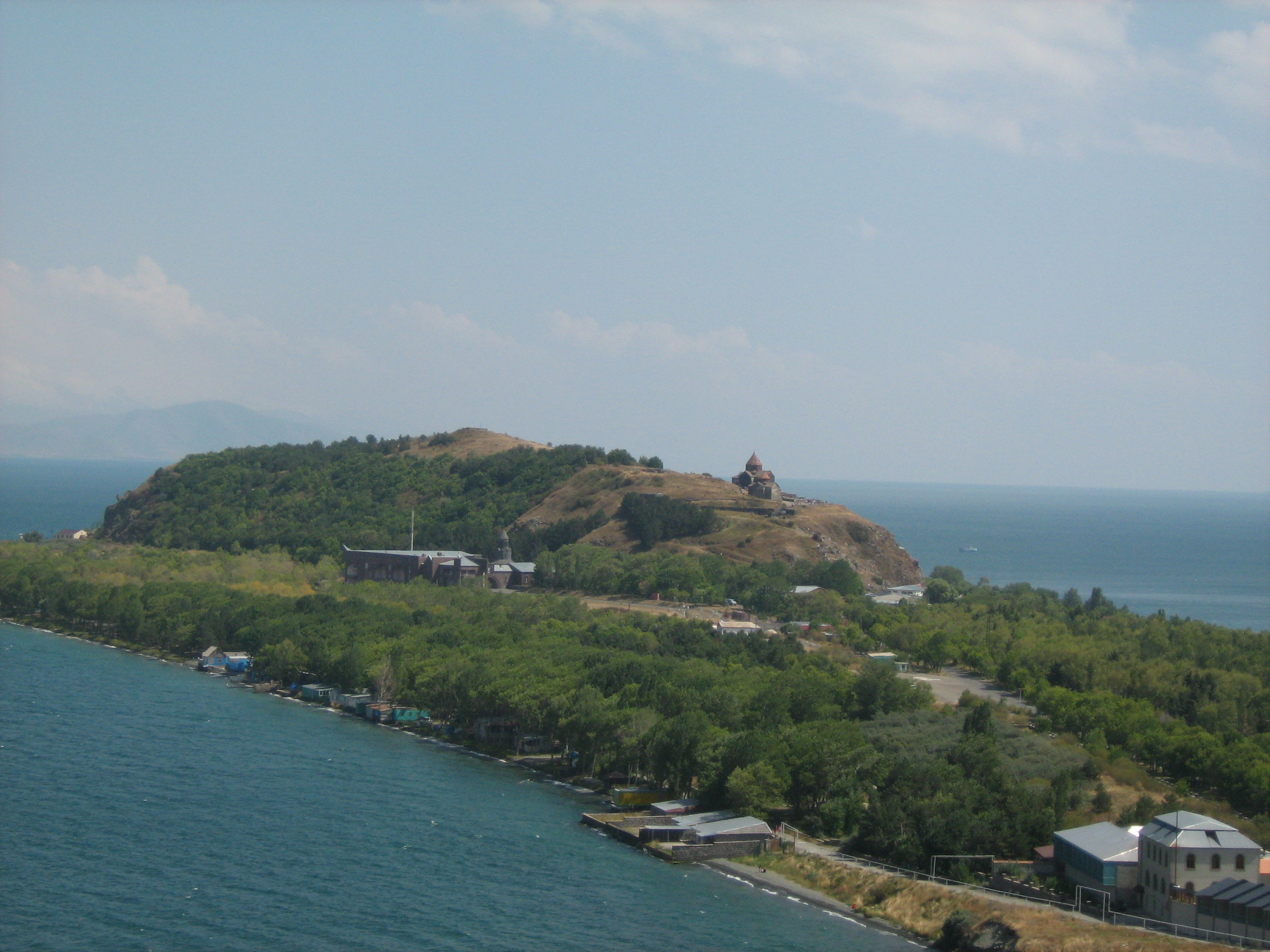
2012

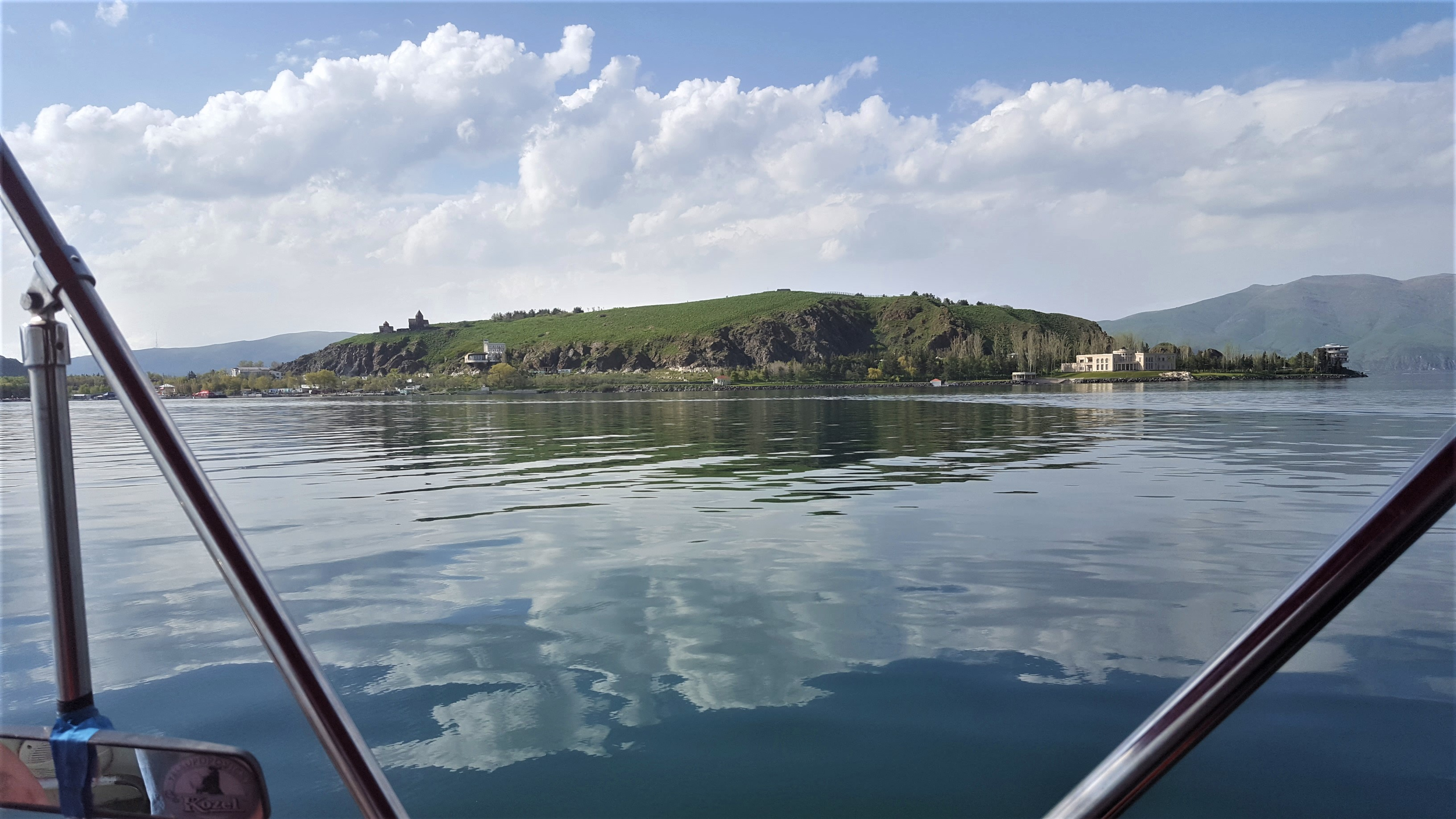
2017

=== Panorama ===
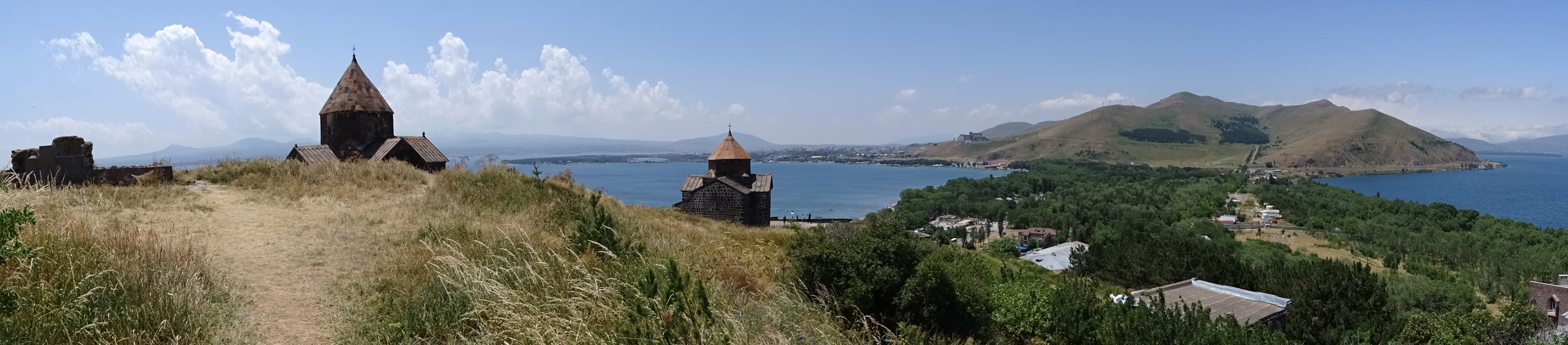
Panoramic view of the Sevan Peninsula

== See also ==
- Lake Sevan
- Sevanavank
