= Vaskenian Theological Academy =

Seminary

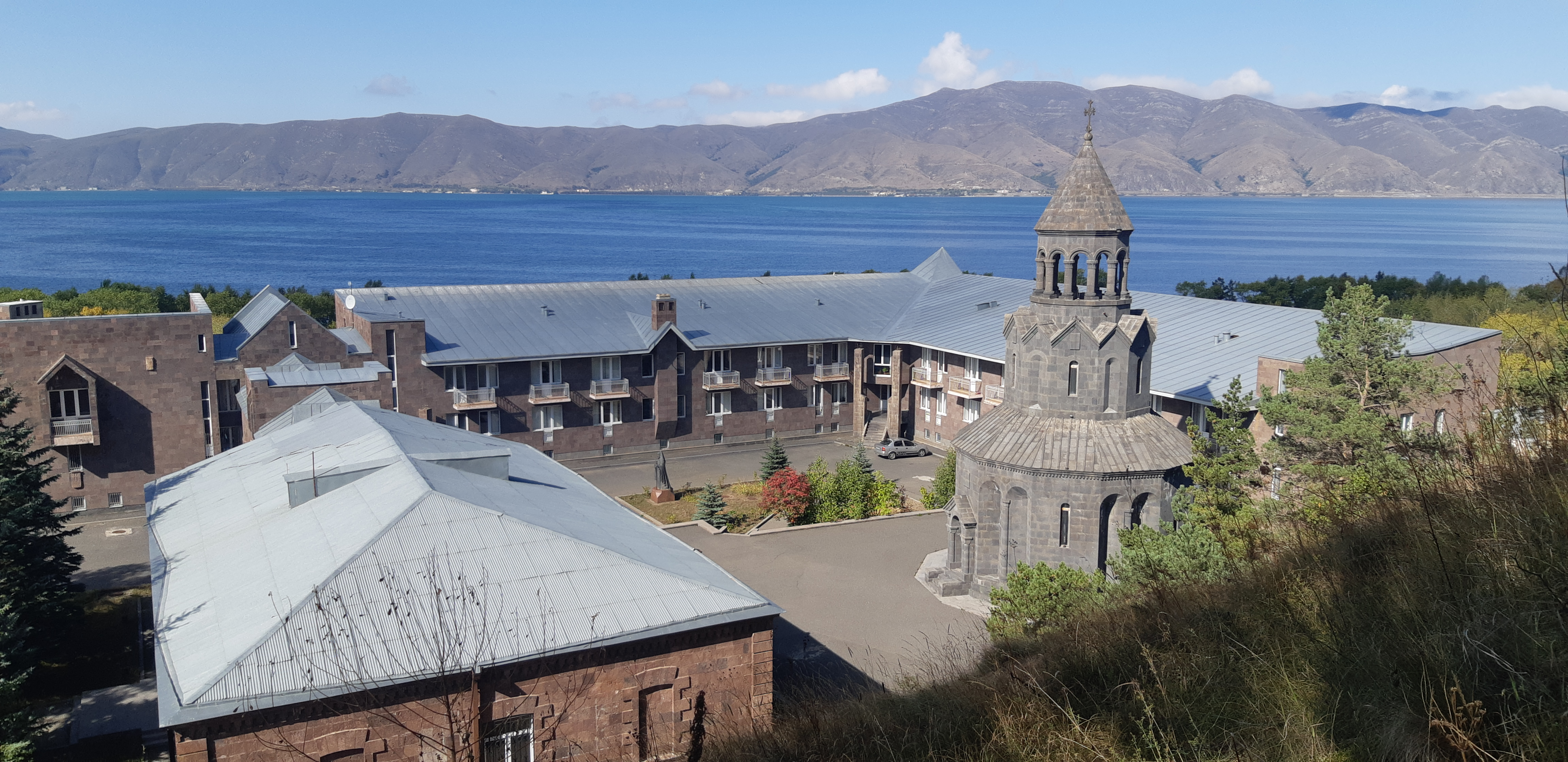
- Vaskenian Theological Academy

Religion
- Affiliation: Armenian Apostolic Church
- Status: Active

Location
- Location: Sevan peninsula, Lake Sevan, Armenia
- Interactive map of Vaskenian Theological Academy
- Coordinates: 40.565130°N 45.010761°E

Architecture
- Style: Armenian
- Completed: 1990

Vaskenian Theological Academy (also Vazgenian, Vazgenyan, Vazgenian Seminary), is a seminary of the Armenian Apostolic Church on the Sevan peninsula on the shores of Lake Sevan in Armenia. It operates under the direct supervision of the Mother See of Holy Etchmiadzin.

== History ==
The Vaskenian Theological Academy of Sevan was re-established in 1990 on the peninsula of Lake Sevan during the catholicosate of Vasken I, and after his death in 1994 was renamed the Vaskenian Theological Academy in his honor.

The seminary has also hosted several symposiums. Hundreds of pilgrims visit every year.

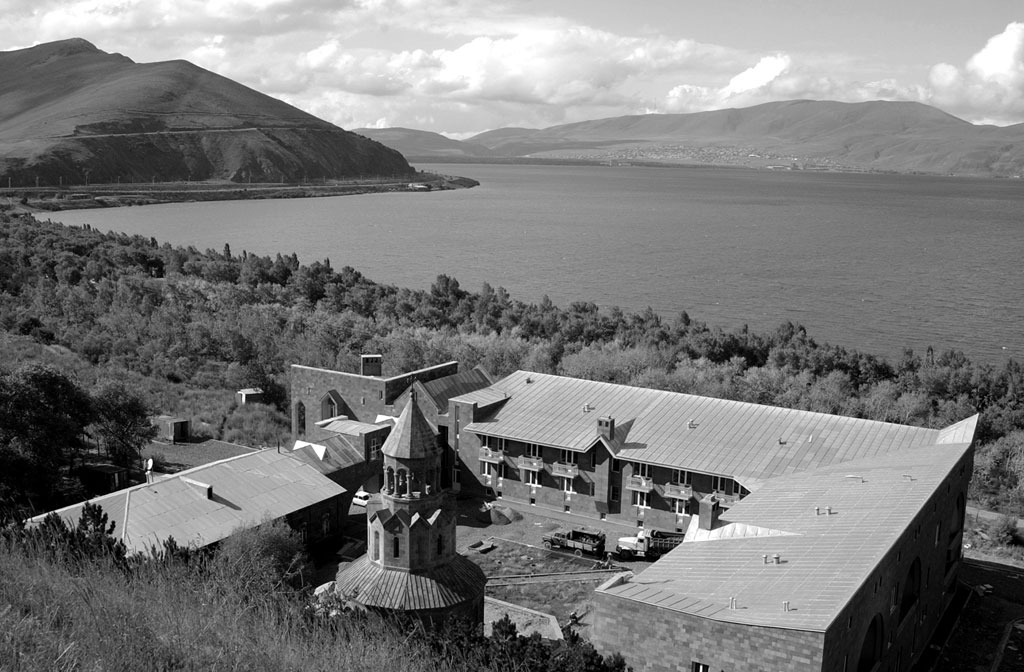
Vaskenian Academy as seen from Sevanavank monastery

== Programs ==
Students complete their 4th, 5th, and 6th years of education at the Gevorkian Theological Seminary at the Mother See of Holy Etchmiadzin.

The basic curriculum includes theology, the Church Fathers, literature, history, art, new and old testament, patristics, liturgics and traditions of the Armenian Church.

In 2005 the seminary started a translation program in which some students translate works into English and Russian which are then edited and published.

Later a Green Theology program was introduced, addressing ecological issues.

== Buildings ==
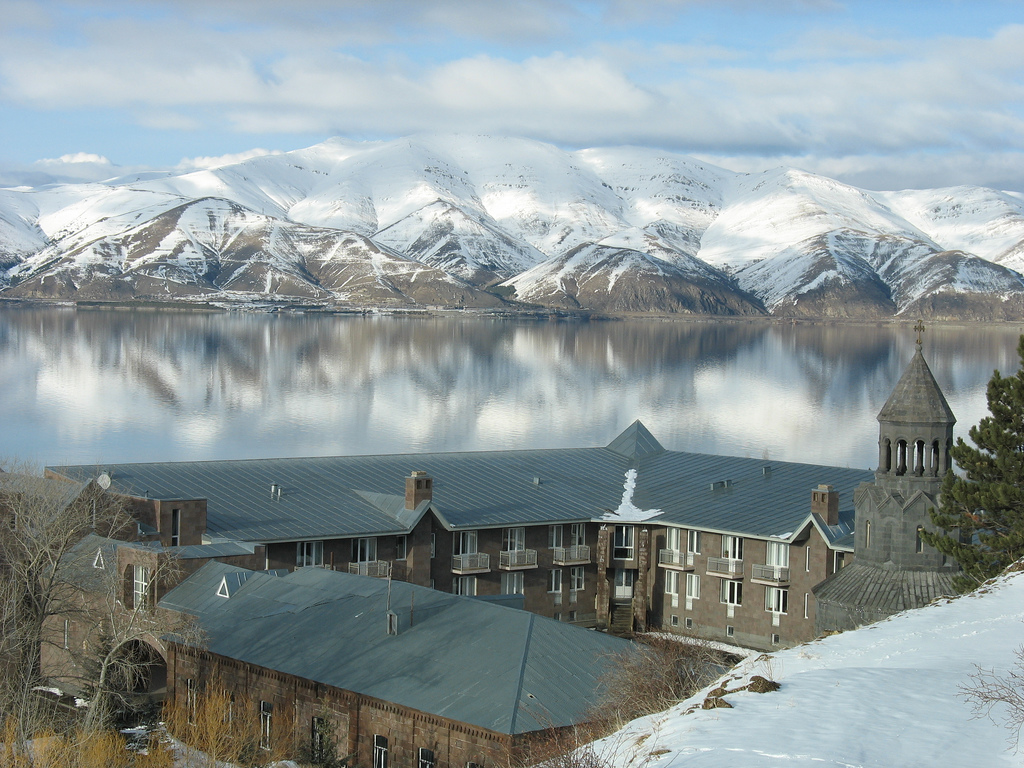
The academy on the shores of Sevan in winter

The Vaskenian Academy of Lake Sevan is situated on the peninsula of Sevan. The original seminary consisted of an ancillary building that was constructed in 1897 by Catholicos Mkrtich Khrimian (1892-1907); however, it was never used for that purpose (in the early 1990s it served as classrooms, dormitory, and dining room). As the seminary grew, the Seminary property was extended and a stone building was added to be used for classrooms; the original building became a dormitory. A dining hall was constructed between the two buildings. A further building was added in 2004. The capacity of the seminary was increased with the addition of a new dormitory; increasing capacity to 80 students. The Gevorkian Seminary has 150 students.

The seminary consists of an academic and a dormitory building. There is a smaller building connecting the two that served as the old dining hall. Above the seminary at the top of the hill are two churches, St. Karapet and the Church of the Holy Apostles, which are depicted in many scenes of Lake Sevan.

Within the academic building there are an auditorium, 5 lecture halls, a library and offices.

== Churches ==
Surp Hakob Chapel within the academy

- Sevanavank monastery including the Church of Surp Karapet and the Church of the Holy Apostles.
- Surp Hakob Chapel, consecrated at the end of 2005, allows services to be conducted when the weather is inclement.
