= Levon Ananyan =

Armenian journalist and translator (1946–2013)

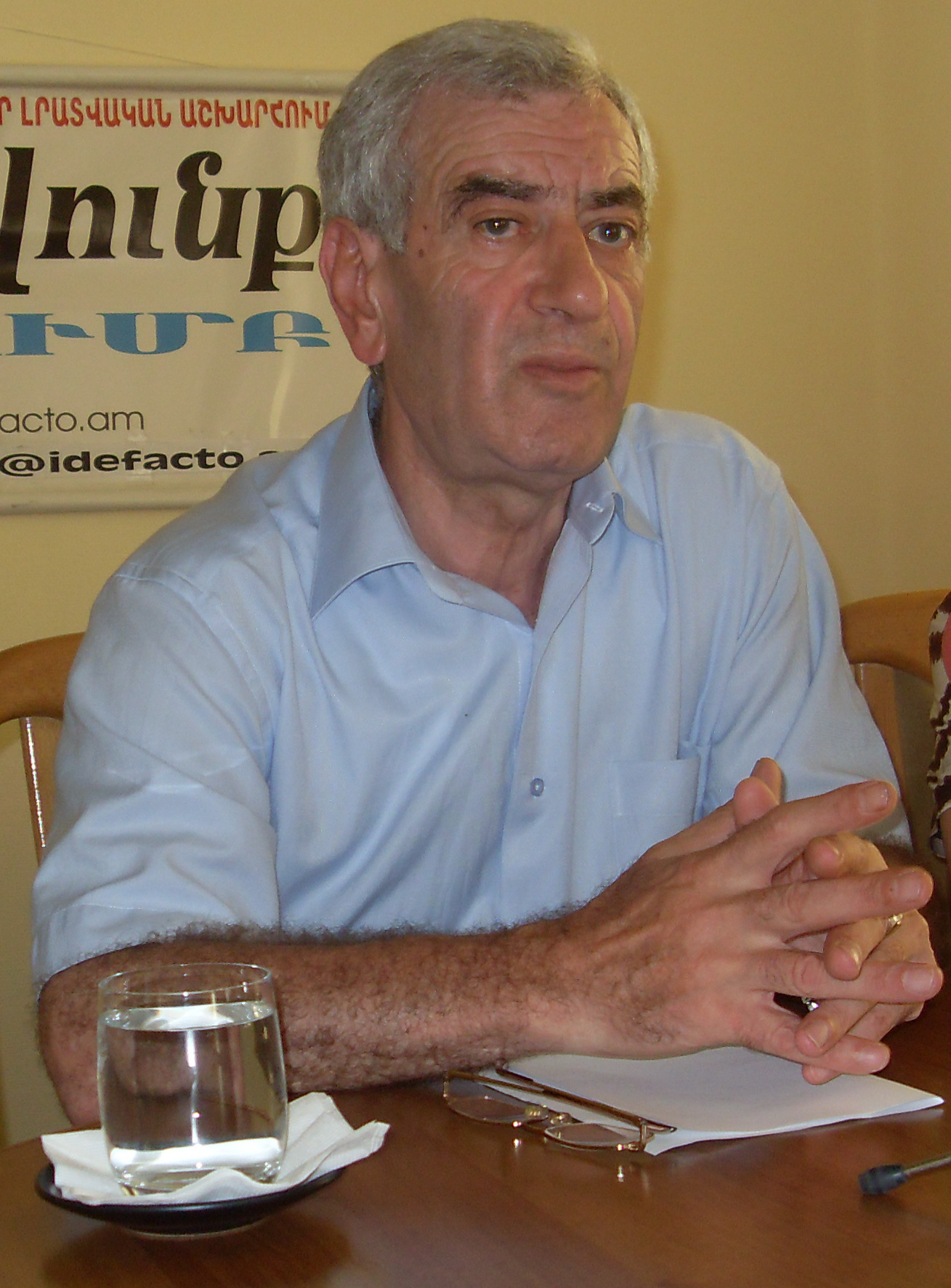
- Levon Ananyan, Yerevan, 2010
- Born: 13 October 1946; Koghb, Tavush, Armenia
- Died: 2 September 2013 (aged 66); Yerevan
- Occupations: journalist and translator
- Known for: President of Writers Union of Armenia

Levon Ananyan (Armenian: Լևոն Զաքարի Անանյան; 13 October 1946 – 2 September 2013) was an Armenian journalist and translator.

== Biography ==
Born in Koghb, Tavush, Levon Ananyan was a graduate of the Yerevan State University, Department of Philology. He worked for a number of state journals. For approximately 25 years, he worked for the Garoun monthly.

In 1989, he became a member of the Writers Union of Armenia, and from 1990 – 2001 he was chief editor for Garoun.

In 2001, he was elected President of the Writers' Union of Armenia. He was re-elected as the RA Writers' Union chairman in 2009. He lectures at the Yerevan State University Department of Journalism. He was the president of the Noyemberyan NGO. He was also a member of the Journalists' Union.

He authored many articles on social and political issues, which have been printed in the state press. He also translated and published Russian and English books to the Armenian language; he founded "Apollo" Publishers.

== Works ==
- Ananyan, Levon (2008). Chermak hogh, karmir hishoghutʻyun : antʻologia (in Armenian). Erevan, Armenia: HGM hratarakchʻutʻyun. ISBN 978-99941-74-95-9. OCLC 320623369.
- Ananyan, Levon (2006). Hushanver : tarber tarineri banasteghtsut?yunner [Souvenir] (in Armenian). Erevan, Armenia: Zangak 97. ISBN 99941-1-245-7. OCLC 301951097.
- Ananyan, Levon (2006). Dzon hayotsʻ lezvin : banasteghtsutʻyunner (in Armenian). Erevan, Armenia: HGM hratarakchʻutʻyun. OCLC 607761436.
- Turmoil, Yerevan, 2004
- Drama on Stage and on the Screen, Yerevan, 1996
- Roots and Foliage, Yerevan, 1987

== Translations From Russian and English to Armenian ==
- Contemporary Russian Statue, Yerevan, 2005
- Ray Bradbury's Fahrenheit 451, 1986
