= Anushavan =

Anushavan Անուշավան
- Location within Armenia Location within Shirak
- Coordinates: 40°38′31″N 43°58′56″E
- Country: Armenia
- Province: Shirak
- Municipality: Artik
- Elevation: 1,720 m (5,640 ft)

Population (2011)
  - Total: 2,070
- Time zone: UTC+4
  - Summer (DST): UTC+5

Anushavan (Armenian: Անուշավան) is a village in the Artik Municipality of the Shirak Province of Armenia. In 1969, the town was renamed in honor of Dr. Anushavan Galoyan, a World War II hero. The Statistical Committee of Armenia reported its population was 2,185 in 2010, up from 1,983 at the 2001 census.

== Demographics ==
Historical population
Year	Pop.	±% p.a.
1831	267	—
1873	782	+2.59%
1914	1,520	+1.63%
1939	1,384	−0.37%
1959	1,503	+0.41%
1970	1,755	+1.42%
1979	1,825	+0.44%
2001	1,983	+0.38%
2011	2,070	+0.43%
