= Mrgavet =

Mrgavet Մրգավետ
- Location within Armenia Location within Ararat
- Coordinates: 40°01′48″N 44°28′48″E
- Country: Armenia
- Province: Ararat
- Municipality: Artashat

Population (2011)
  - Total: 2,084
- Time zone: UTC+4
  - Summer (DST): UTC+5

Mrgavet (Armenian: Մրգավետ) is a village in the Artashat Municipality of the Ararat Province of Armenia.
