= Mets Parni =

Mets Parni Մեծ Պառնի
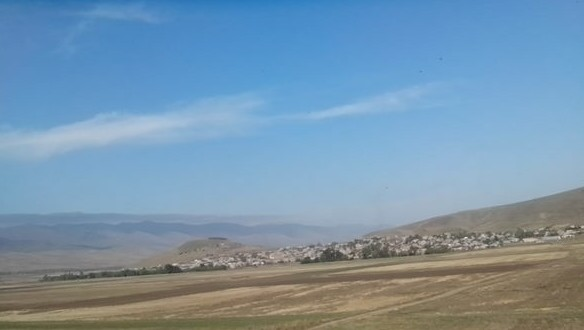

- Location within Armenia
- Coordinates: 40°50′14″N 44°06′33″E
- Country: Armenia
- Marz (Province): Lori Province
- Elevation: 1,680 m (5,510 ft)

Population (2011)
  - Total: 1,839
- Time zone: UTC+4
  - Summer (DST): UTC+5

Mets Parni (Armenian: Մեծ Պառնի; also, Parni) is a town in the Lori Province of Armenia, 33 km north-west of the regional capital Vanadzor. The village is located on the right bank of the river Pambak, 1680 meters above sea level.

The village is located near two churches; St. Sarkis (19th century) and Mets Parni Church (13-14 centuries).

== Demographics ==
The population of Mets Parni has steadily grown since 1831, with a brief depopulation after the 1988 earthquake.

Years	1831	1897	1926	1939	1959	1970	1979	1989	2001	2004
Population	505	2420	2760	2686	2313	2511	2153	785	2171	2313

== Economy ==
The village may be one of Armenia's oldest settlements, and is located on the central Yerevan-Gyumri highway. The Yerevan-Tbilisi railway passes through the village. Before the 1988 earthquake the village hosted two parallel industrialized workshops, a branch of Arzni crystal factory and a garment factory. The climate of the area is very favorable to agriculture. The main employment sector in the village is crop cultivation and animal husbandry. Most of the village's lands are irrigated and fertile, and are mainly used to produce grain and potatoes. After the earthquake destroyed a number of homes, training and education of pre-school age children and students work continued. However, due to financial constraints a series of temporary shelters were closed, but work continues on a new 450-seat high school. There is a medical center with 15 beds and an outpatient clinic. The Health Center is equipped with specialists, a pediatrician, therapist, and a dentist.

== Name Origin ==
The name bears the suffix -ni, evident in many names in the area since Urartian times, for example, Garni, Ptghni, Bjni, Armani, Bagratuni, Aratsani, Gnuni, Saharuni, Rshtuni, and so on. It is possible Parni took its name from an archaic name for the Pambak valley area, which is surrounds the village. Mets Parni as a settlement existed in ancient times, which is evidenced by ancient river bed graves discovered during constructions near the village of Tsaghkaber. The village was likely destroyed and rebuilt several times. In particular, the village is located on the eastern side of a high hill that often protect the people from enemies.

== Gallery ==
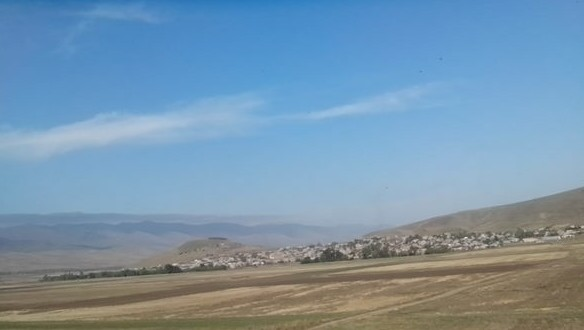

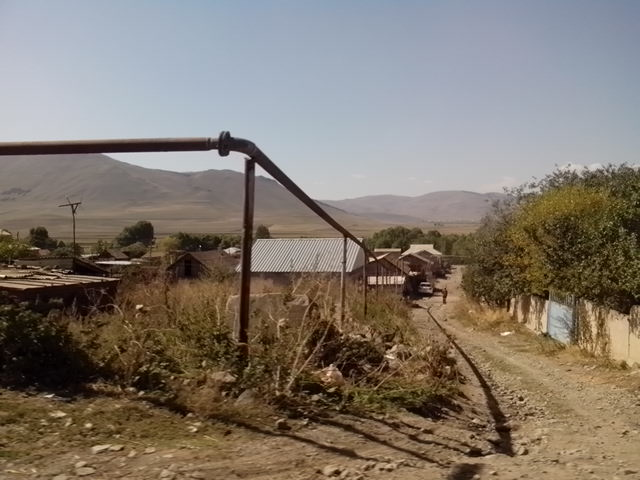
