= Tsaghkaber =

Tsaghkaber Ծաղկաբեր
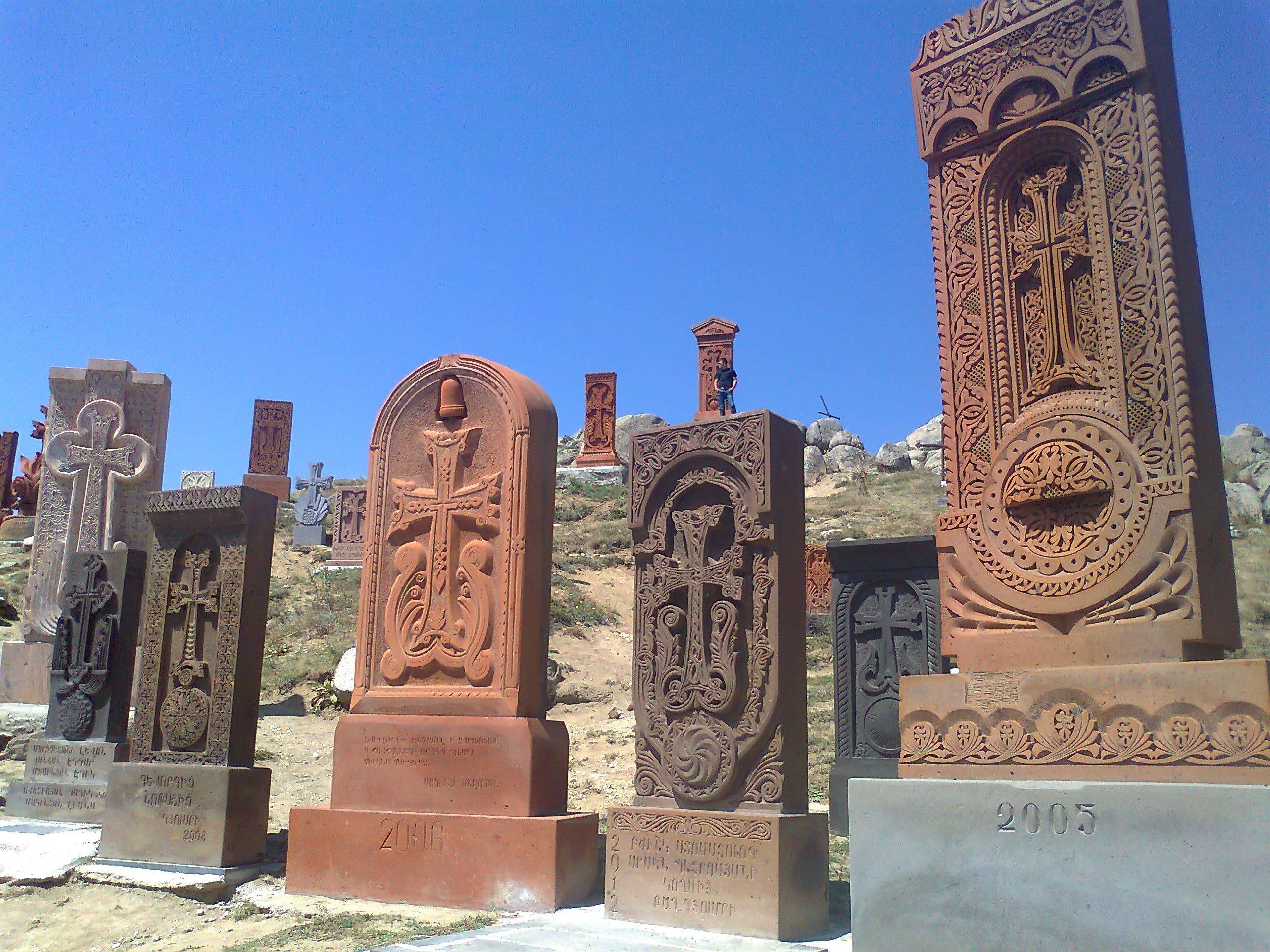
- Chapel of St. John

- Location within Armenia
- Coordinates: 40°47′55″N 44°06′26″E
- Country: Armenia
- Marz (Province): Lori Province
- Elevation: 1,750 m (5,740 ft)

Population (2011)
  - Total: 1,195
- Time zone: UTC+4 ( )
  - Summer (DST): UTC+5 ( )

Tsaghkaber (Armenian: Ծաղկաբեր, also romanized as Tsakhkaber and Tzaghkaber) is a town in the Lori Province of Armenia.
