= Writers Union of Armenia =

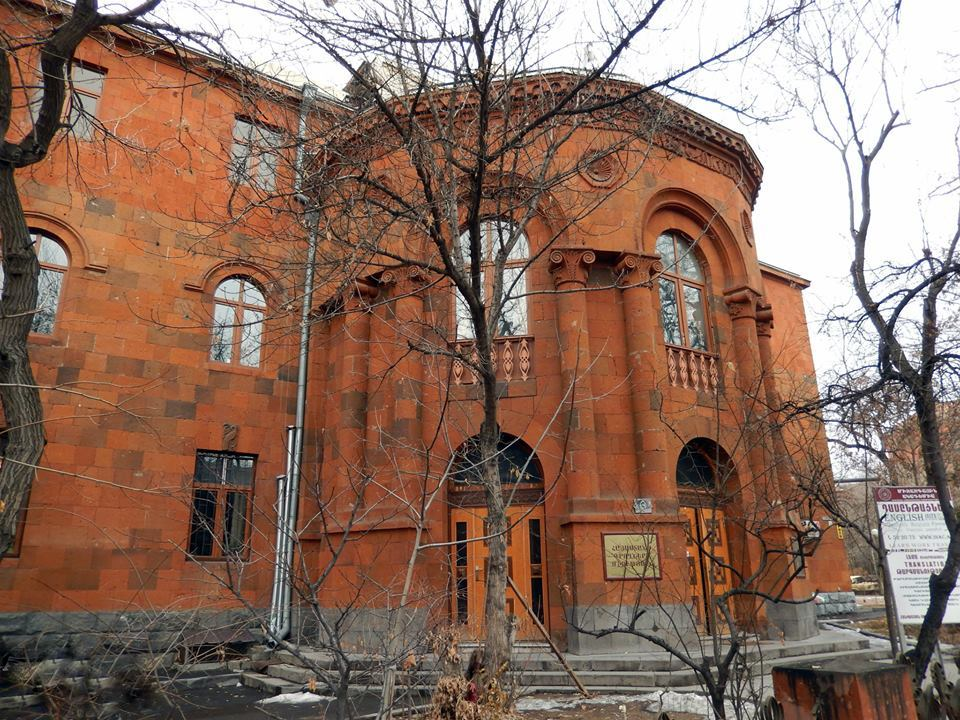
The Writers Union of Armenia

The Writers' Union of Armenia was founded in August 1934, simultaneously with the USSR Union of Writers and as a component part of the USSR Union.

== 1930s ==
The Constituent Assembly was held during 1 August - 5 August, after which the Armenian delegation of writers took part in USSR Writers' Union Constituent Assembly.

== World War II ==
In Armenia in September 1939 the millennial anniversary of Sasuntsi Davit epos was celebrated. On this occasion the USSR Writers' Union directorate's plenary session was held in Armenia. In 1941, from 10 May until 20 May the Armenian Literature Decade was organized in Moscow.

More than fifty Armenian writers fought in the Great Patriotic War.

== 1940s ==
In 1946 the Second Assembly was held. It resolved that Avetik Isahakyan be the president of the Writers' Union of Armenia.

== 1950s, 60 & 70s ==
The Third Assembly was held in July 1954 and Avetik Isahakya was re-elected. As a result of the fourth (January 1959), the fifth (November 1966) and the sixth (January 1971) Assemblies Edward Topchyan was elected as the Secretary-in-Charge of the Union.

The Seventh Assembly (April 1976 of the Writers' Union elected Vardges Petrosyan as the Secretary-in-Charge.

== 1980s ==
As a result of the eighth (May 1981) and the ninth (May 1986) Assemblies he became the president of the Union. In 1988 a special session was held after which Hrachya Hovhannisyan was elected as the president.

== 1990s ==
On 15 June 1990, the directorate of Writers' Union self-published the organization's project. In the September of the same year the Writers' Union building was transferred to a special army detachment as a general headquarters.

Armenian writers took active part in the reconstruction of the Armenian National State system and in the First Nagorno-Karabakh War. Several writers fought in different battles. One of them, Samvel Shahmuradyan, fell in the battle of Gandzasar.

Vazgen Sargsyan became the defence minister and then the prime minister of Armenia. In September 1990 and February 1991 the Tenth Assembly was held in two phases. Vahagn Davtyan was elected president.

In January 1994 the special session elected Razmik Davoyan as the president. Another special session in 1996 elected Hrant Matevosyan to lead the Union.

== 2000s ==
In 2001 the thirteenth Assembly was held and Levon Ananyan was elected WUA president. In June 2002 the Writers' Union of Armenia organized the first Pan-Armenian Congress and in June 2004 a second was held.

The WUA's publishing house was established in 2002. A young writers' book series called Mutk was published. Alongside existing literary magazines and newspapers (Grakan Tert, Nork, Nor dar, Literaturnaya Armenia) 'Artasahmanyan Grakanutyun magazine, Satirikon (a humorous newspaper), Tsolker and Lusapsak young people's magazines are being published.

In June 2004 the seventy-year Anniversary of Writers' Union of Armenia was celebrated.
