= Koghb, Armenia =

Koghb Կողբ
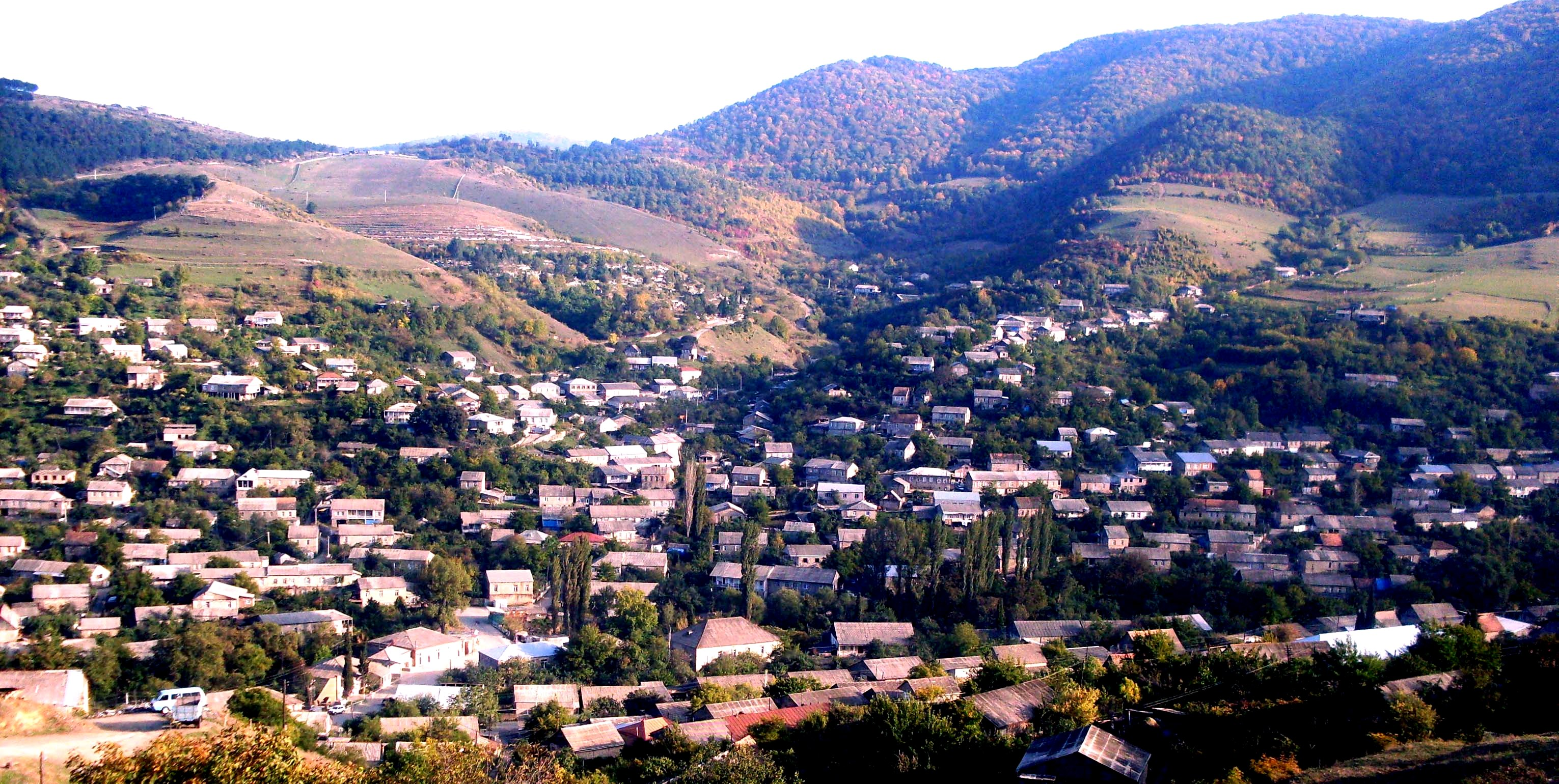
- A view of Koghb

- Location within Armenia Location within Tavush
- Coordinates: 41°10′57″N 44°58′33″E
- Country: Armenia
- Province: Tavush
- Municipality: Noyemberyan
- Elevation: 750 m (2,460 ft)

Population (2011)
  - Total: 4,420
- Time zone: UTC+4 (AMT)
- Website: http://www.koghb.am/

Koghb (Armenian: Կողբ) is a village and rural community in the Noyemberyan Municipality of the Tavush Province of Armenia, located near the town of Noyemberyan.

== Historical heritage ==
Koghb has many religious heritage sites, including the Mshkavank Monastery located on a mountain 3–4 km southwest of the village, which contains a restored 5th-century St. Astvatsatsin Church, the 5th-6th-century Tsghakhach Church, the 6th-century Tvarageghtsi Church and a 12th-13th century cemetery. Northwest of Koghb are the ruins of the Surb Arakel shrine in the old Arakelots village.

There are also many forts in the vicinity of the village, including, the Berdategh cyclopean fort 1.5 km to the southeast, and the fort of Gharanots Gol close by. 10 km west of Koghb are two cyclopean forts, Zikurati and Kozmani, with Bronze Age tomb fields adjacent. 15 km west is the Patashar cyclopean fort.

== Gallery ==
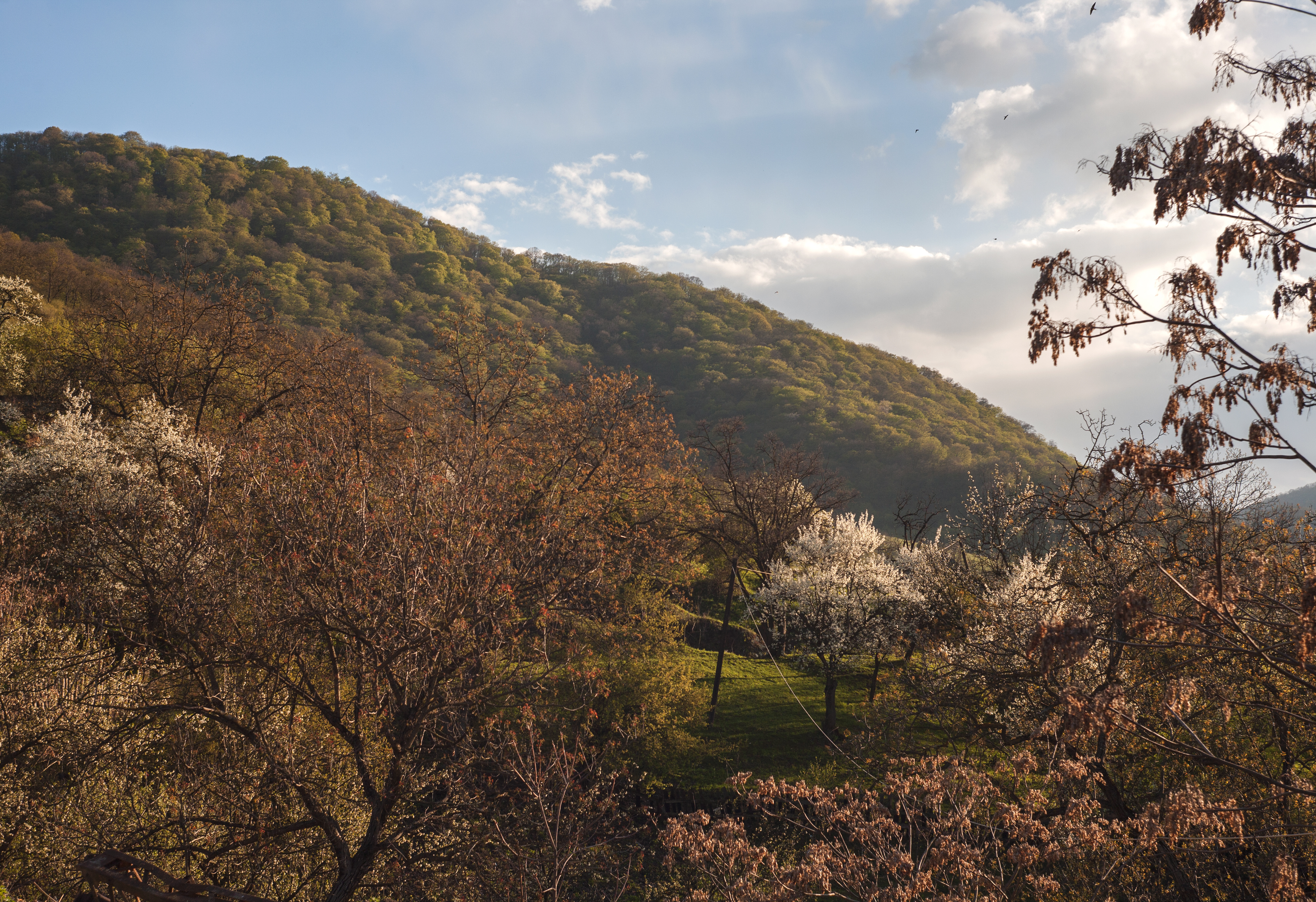
Scenery around Koghb

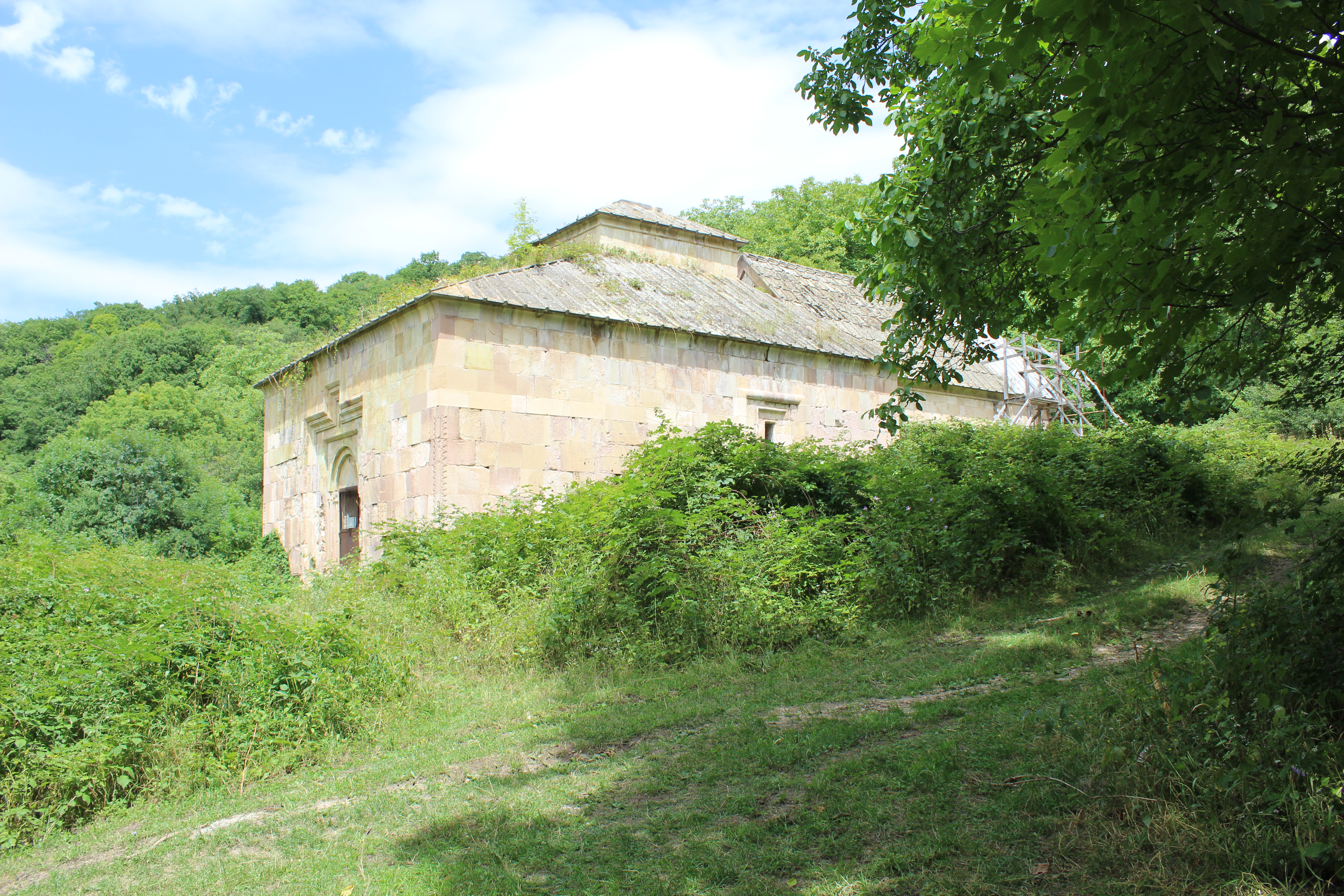
Mshkavank Monastery

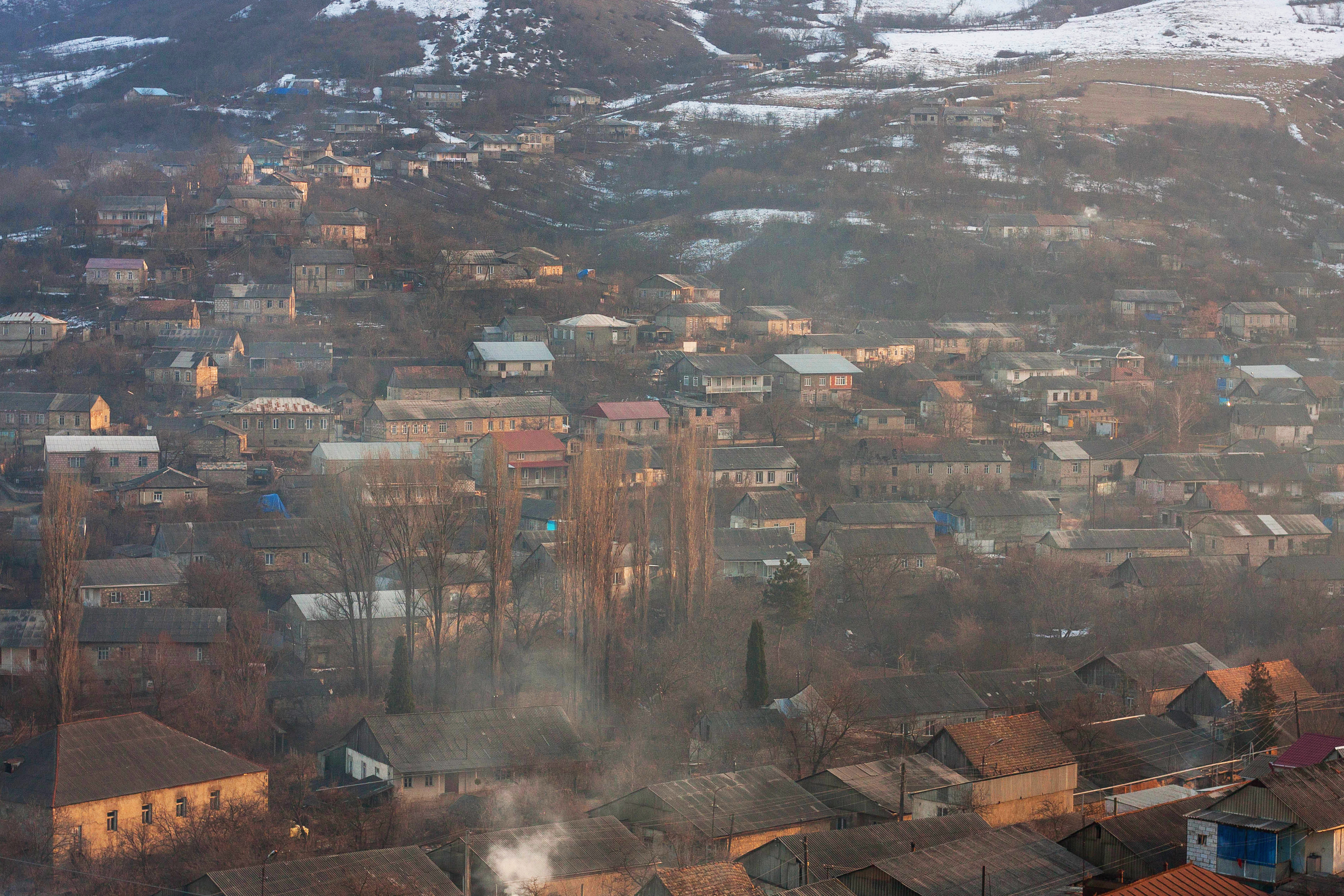
A view of Koghb

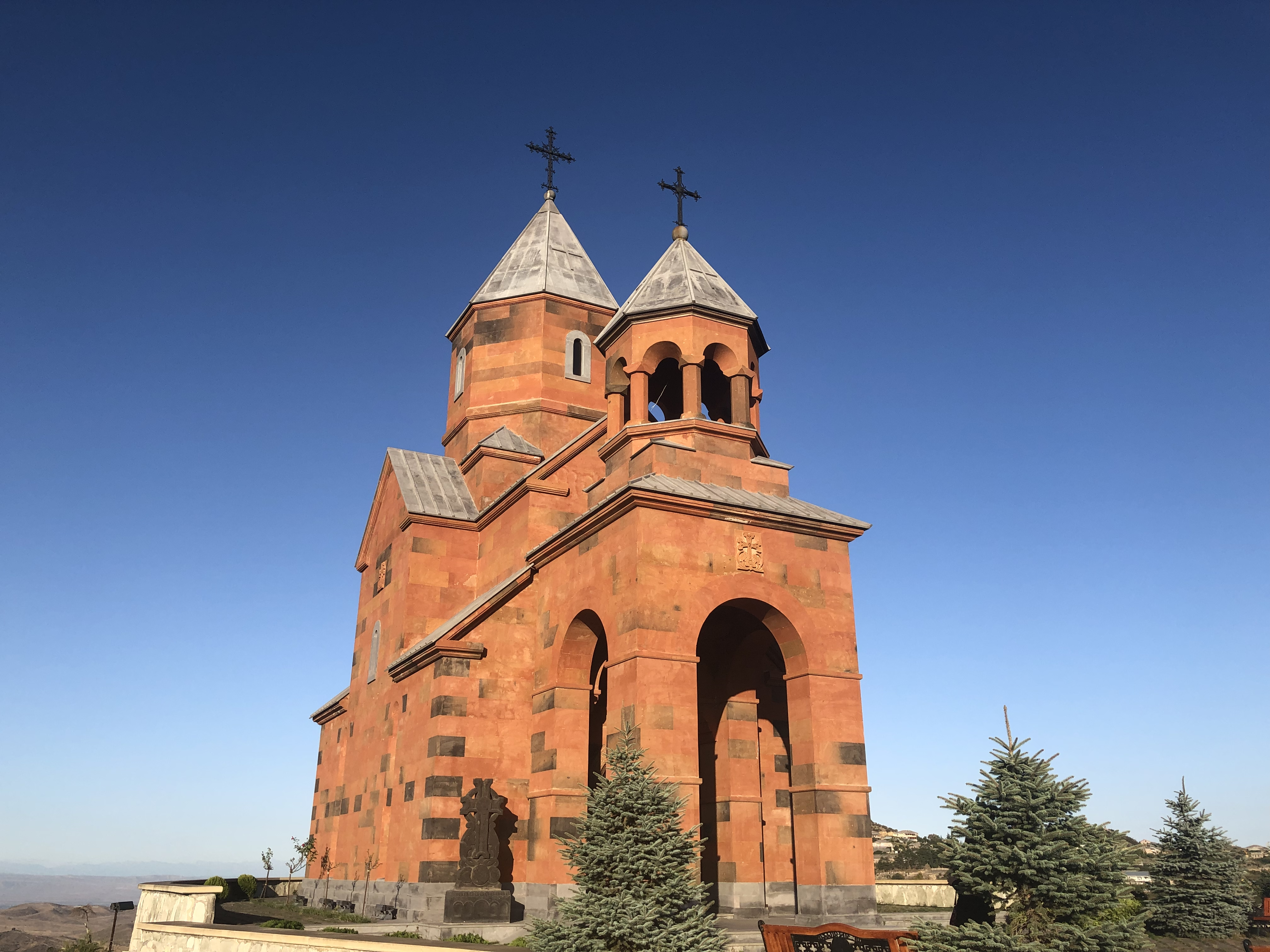
St. John the Evangelist Church

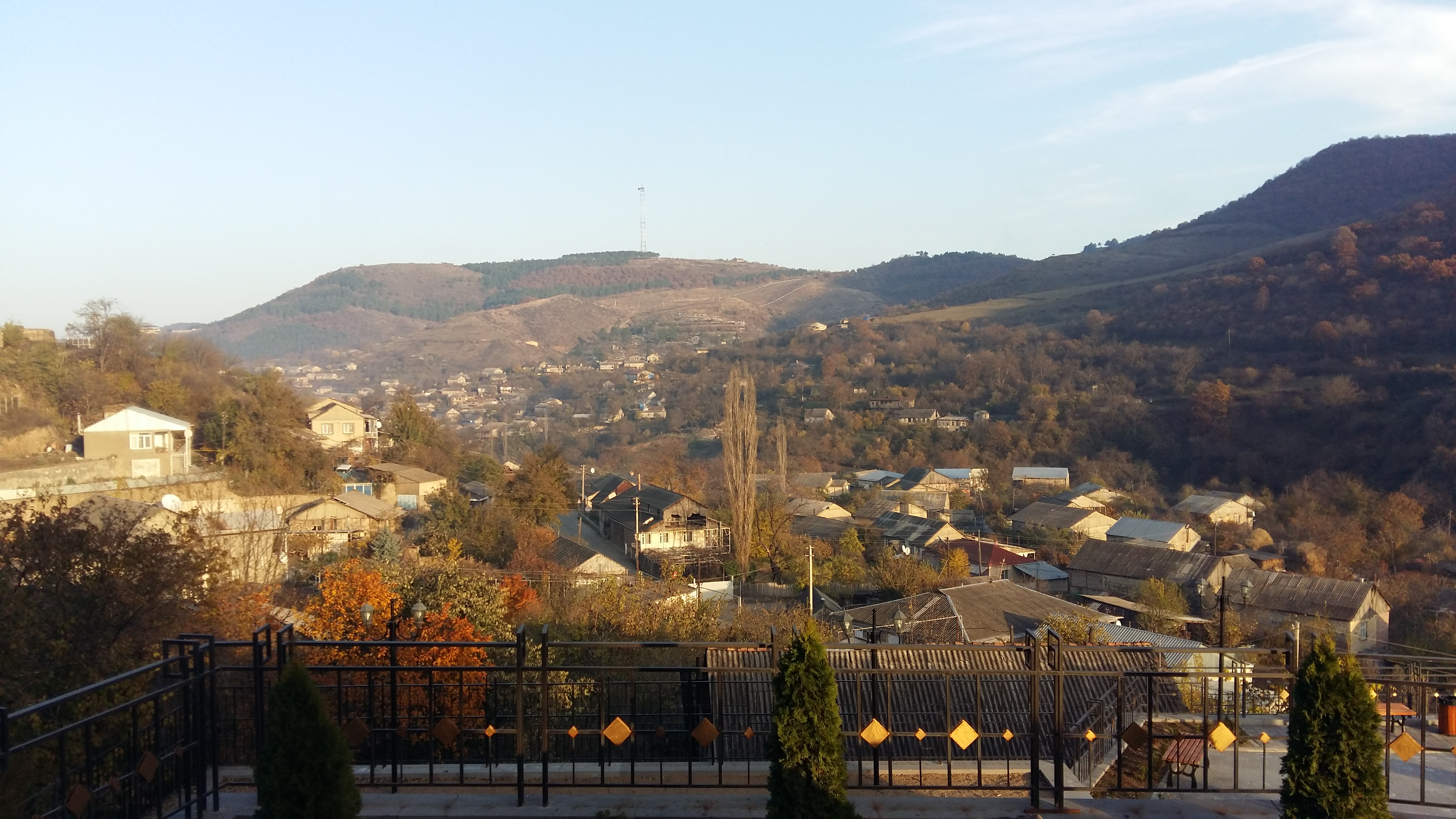
A view of Koghb

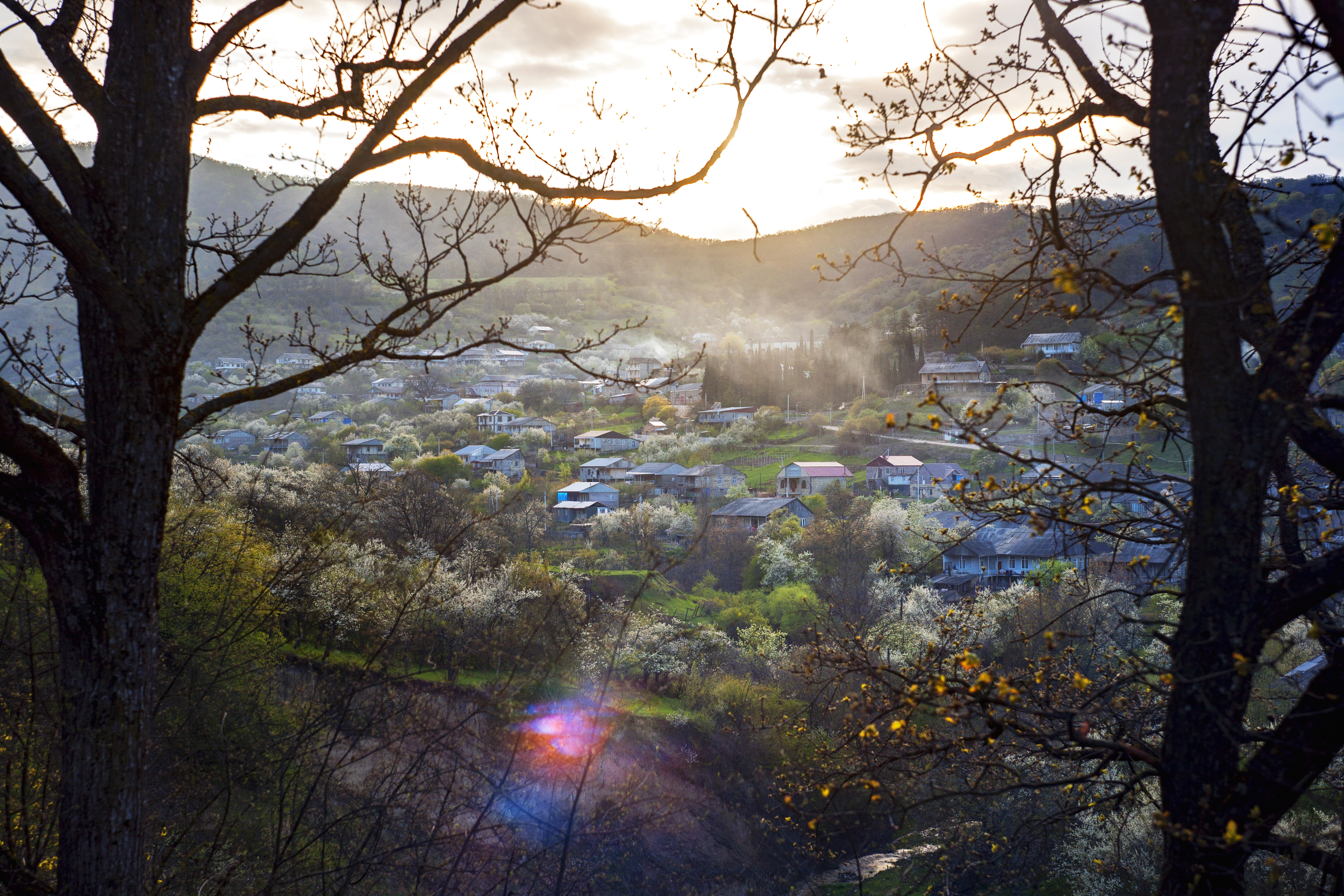
A view of Koghb

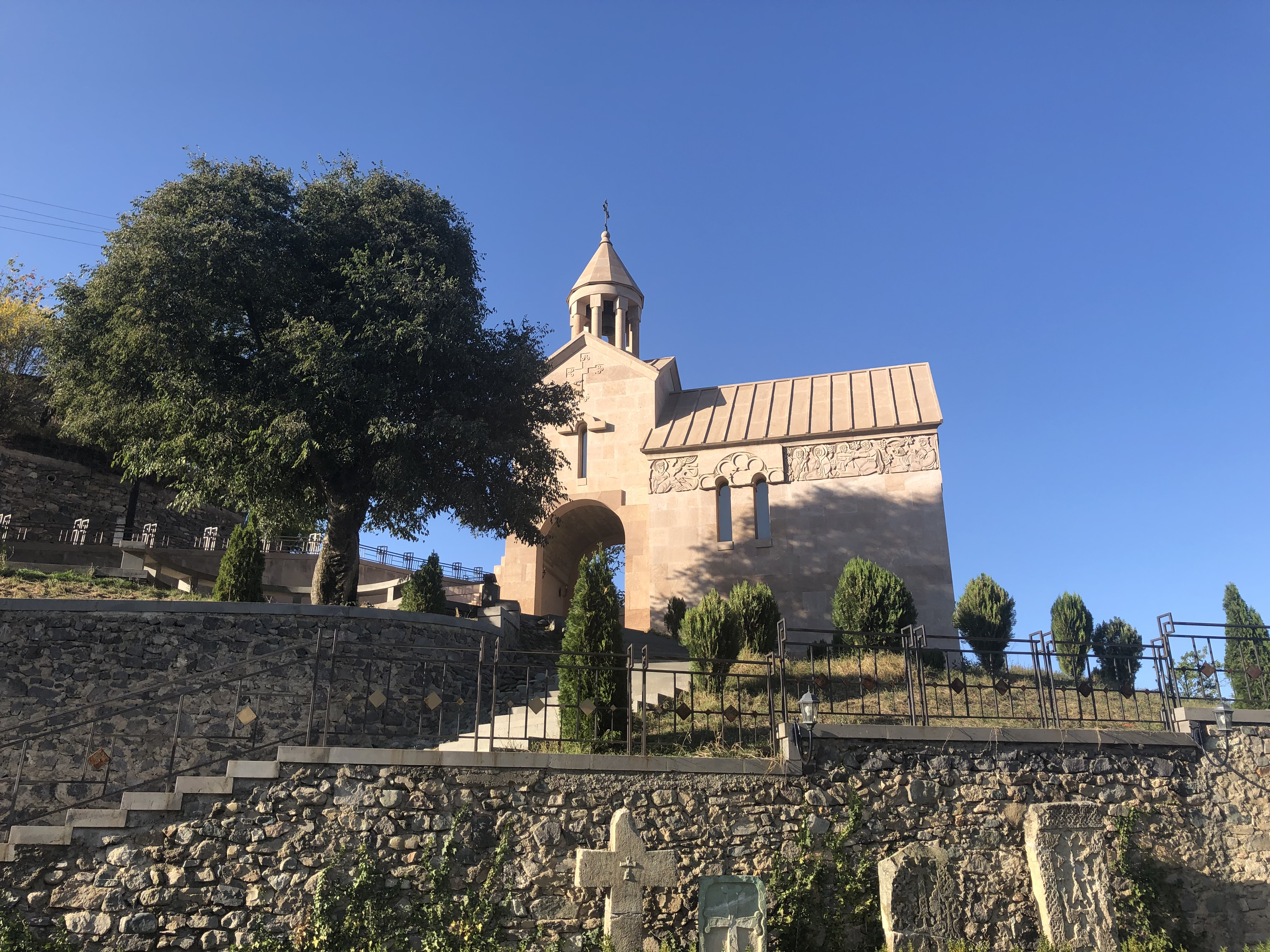
St. Lusavorich Church

== Notable people ==
- Levon Ananyan, journalist and translator
