= Quşçu =

Quşçu or Gushchu may refer to:

- Quşçu Town, Dashkasan, Azerbaijan
- Quşçu Village, Dashkasan, Azerbaijan
- Quşçu Körpüsü, Dashkasan, Azerbaijan
- Quşçu Ayrım, Qazakh, Azerbaijan
- Quşçu, Goygol, Azerbaijan
- Quşçu, Lachin, Azerbaijan
- Quşçu, Shamakhi, Azerbaijan
- Quşçu, Yevlakh, Azerbaijan
- Dağ Quşçu, Siazan, Azerbaijan
- Köhnə Quşçu, Siazan, Azerbaijan
- Aşağı Quşçu, Tovuz, Azerbaijan
- Dondar Quşçu, Tovuz, Azerbaijan

== Seo also ==
- Quşçular (disambiguation)
