= Quşçular =

Quşçular or Gushchular may refer to:

- Quşçular, Goranboy, Azerbaijan
- Quşçular, Jabrayil, Azerbaijan
- Quşçular, Khojavend, Azerbaijan
- Aşağı Quşçular, Shusha, Azerbaijan
- Yuxarı Quşçular, Shusha, Azerbaijan
- Quşçular, Lachin, Azerbaijan

== See also ==
- Quşçu (disambiguation)
