= Khaldan =

Khaldan may refer to:

- Xaldan, Azerbaijan
- Khaldan, Iran
