= Kushchi =

Kushchi may refer to:

- Kechut, Armenia
- Tasik, Armenia
- Quşçu (disambiguation), several places in Azerbaijan
