= Tsapatagh =

Village in Gegharkunik, Armenia

Tsapatagh Ծափաթաղ
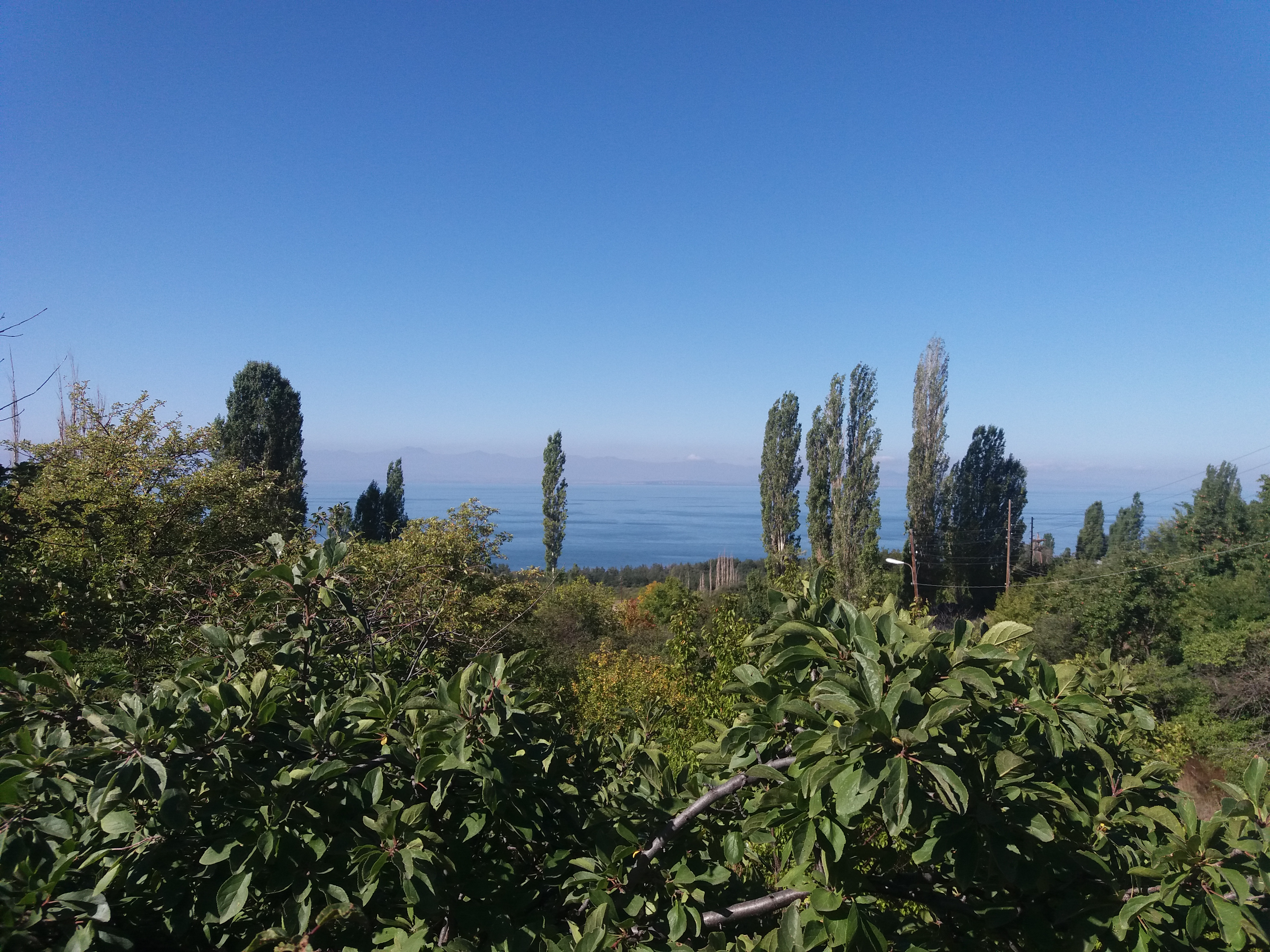
- View of Lake Sevan from the village

- Location within Armenia Location within Gegharkunik
- Coordinates: 40°25′17″N 45°32′00″E
- Country: Armenia
- Province: Gegharkunik
- Municipality: Shoghakat

Population (2011)
  - Total: 360
- Time zone: UTC+4 (AMT)
- Area code: 1611

Tsapatagh (Armenian: Ծափաթաղ) is a resort village in the Shoghakat Municipality of the Gegharkunik Province in Armenia, on the northeastern shore of Lake Sevan.

== Geography and nature ==
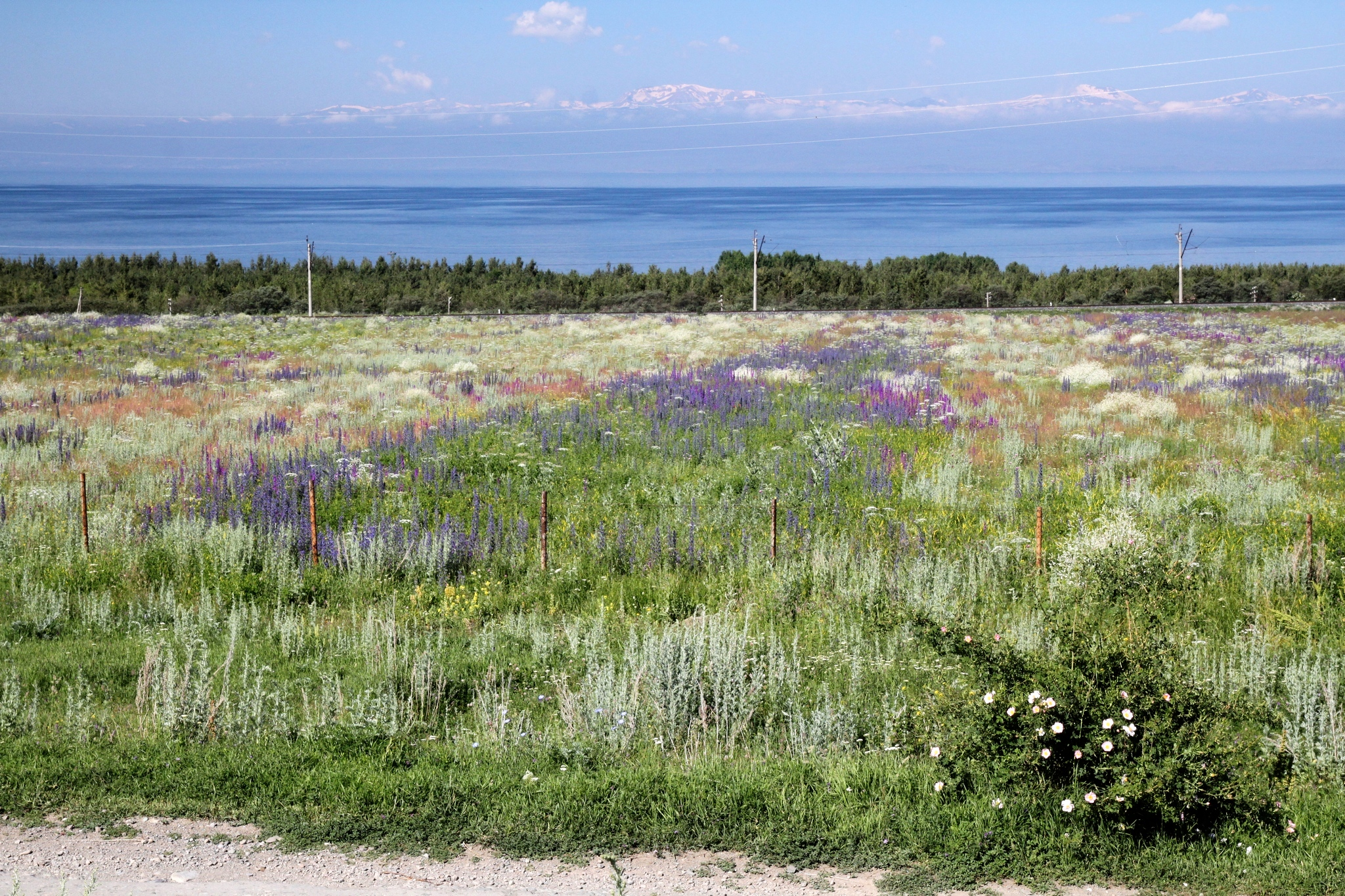
Scenery around Lake Sevan

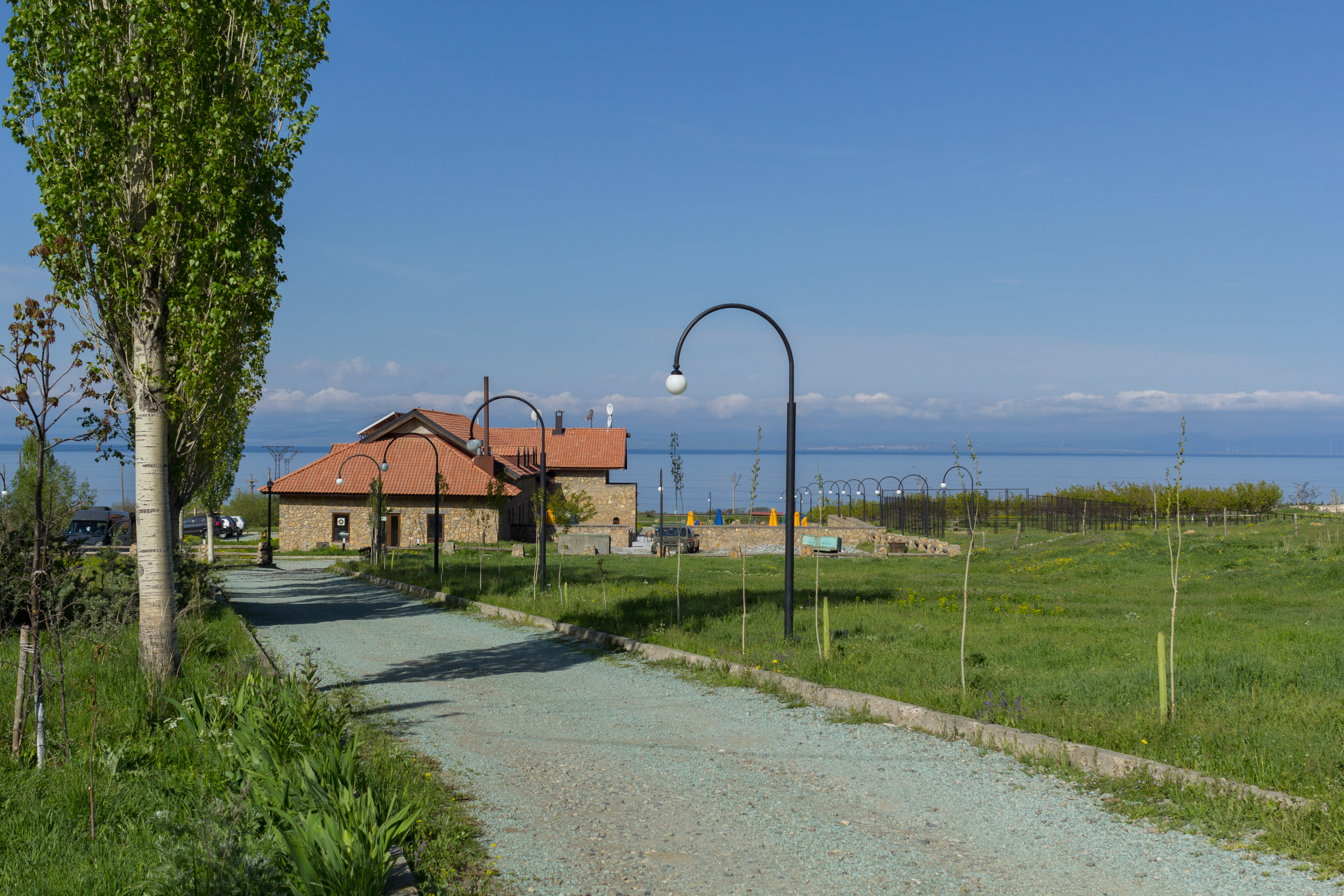
Hotel grounds with Lake Sevan in the background

The village is located in the vicinity of the Tandzut river delta (not to be confused with identically named Tandzut river in the Lori province). Other sources indicate different river names, the Tsapatagh river running through the village and the Shishkert river (or the Shampyrt river) to the southeast of the village. In the surroundings of the village there is a 3,312 hectare large sanctuary with unique relict juniper and open oak woodlands with typical fauna and flora. The climate is somewhat milder than on the western shores and fruit trees like apricot trees can be grown.

== Economy and tourism ==
The Tufenkian Hotel with adjacent solar photovoltaic installations is located in the village. To the southeast, another much larger photovoltaic station is being constructed as of 2020.

== Historical heritage sites ==
There is a 3,000-year old burial area three kilometres to the east of the village. In the southeast, about 1.5 kilometres away, there is a cemetery with khachkars dating from between the 14th and 18th centuries.

== Demographics ==
=== Population ===
In 2014 there were 379 residents according to the local administration. In 2018 there was only one child who begun attending the local school.

Many of modern local residents relocated to the village from Kushchu village of Dashkasan, as well as from Baku and Ganja around 1988–1989. Quite a few of the houses are used only in summer by Yerevan residents.

== Gallery ==
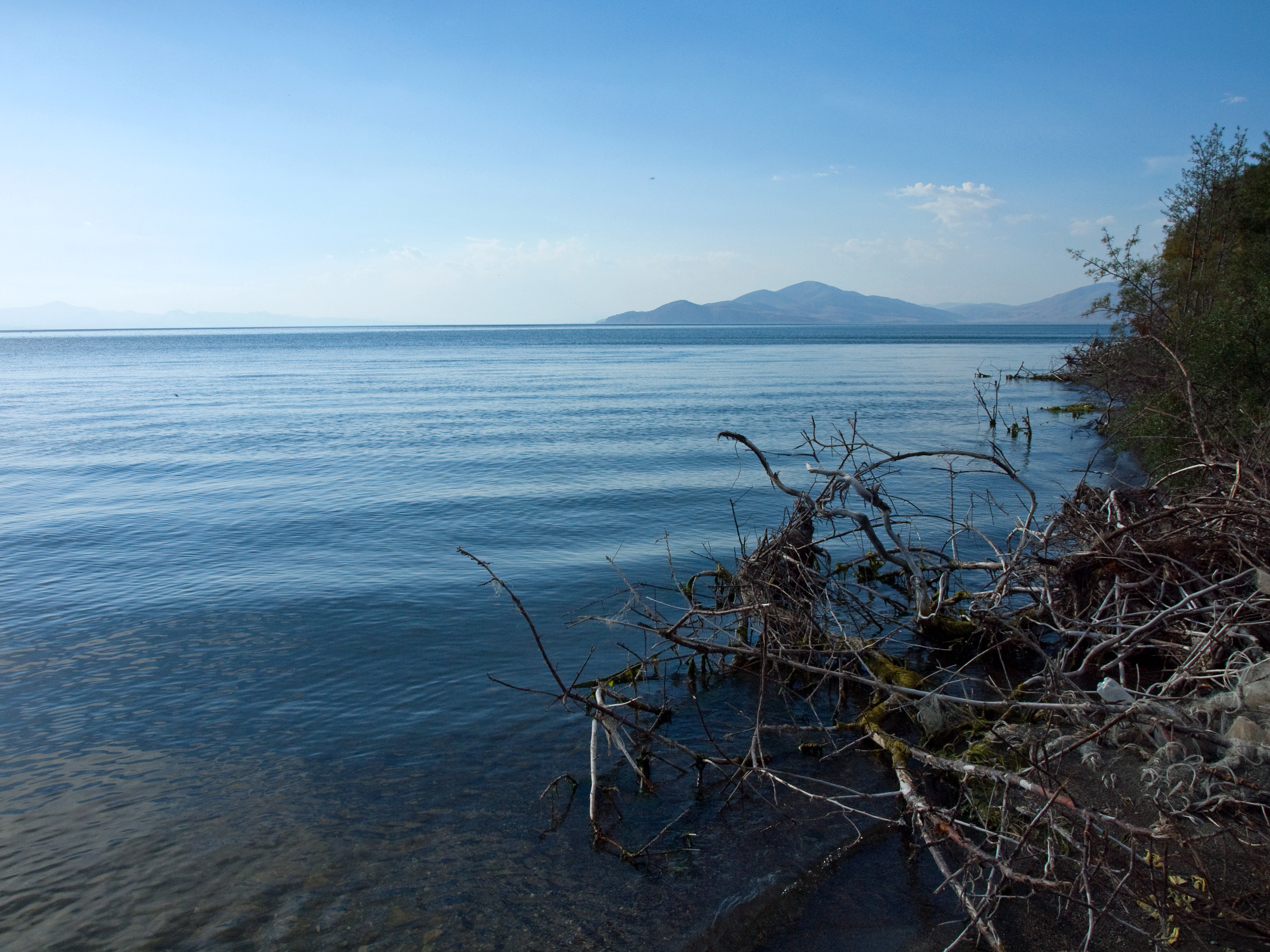
View from the shore of Lake Sevan in Tsapatagh

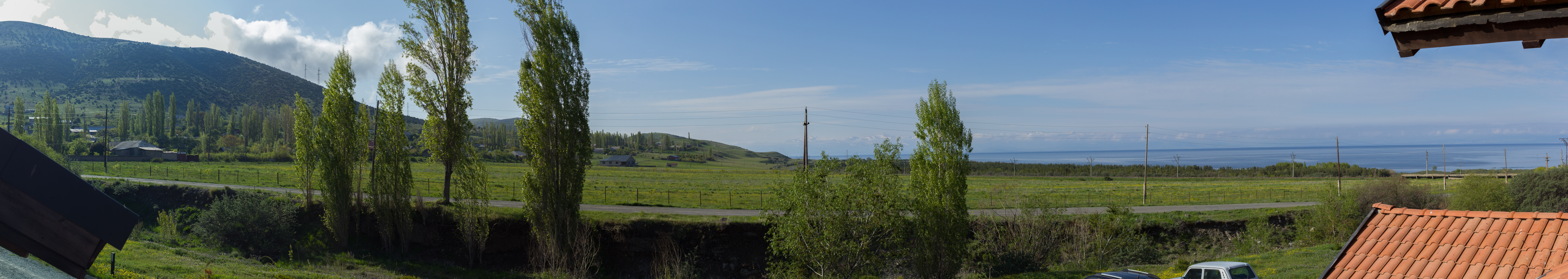
Panoramic view of Tsapatagh

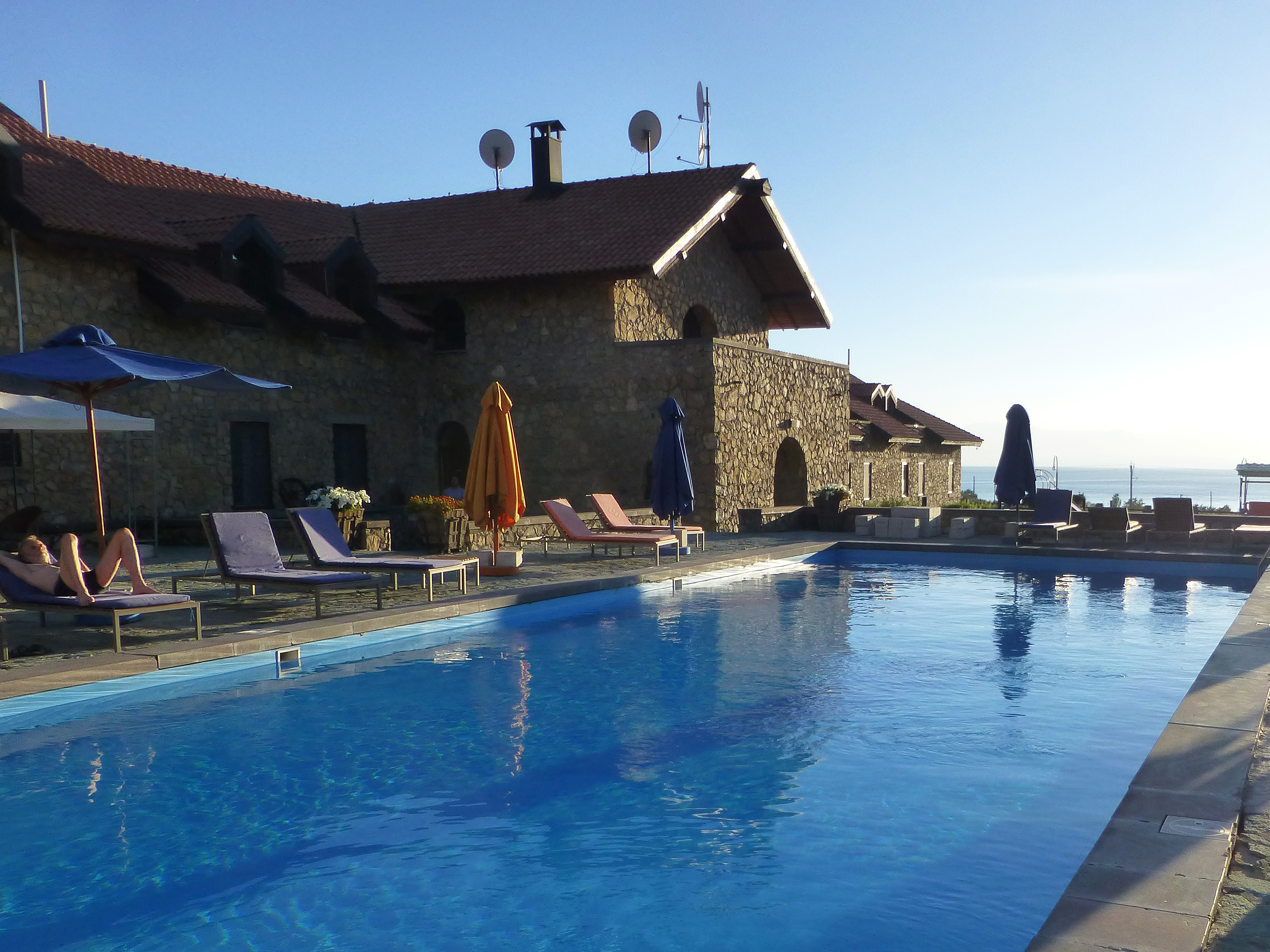
Hotel pool with a lake view

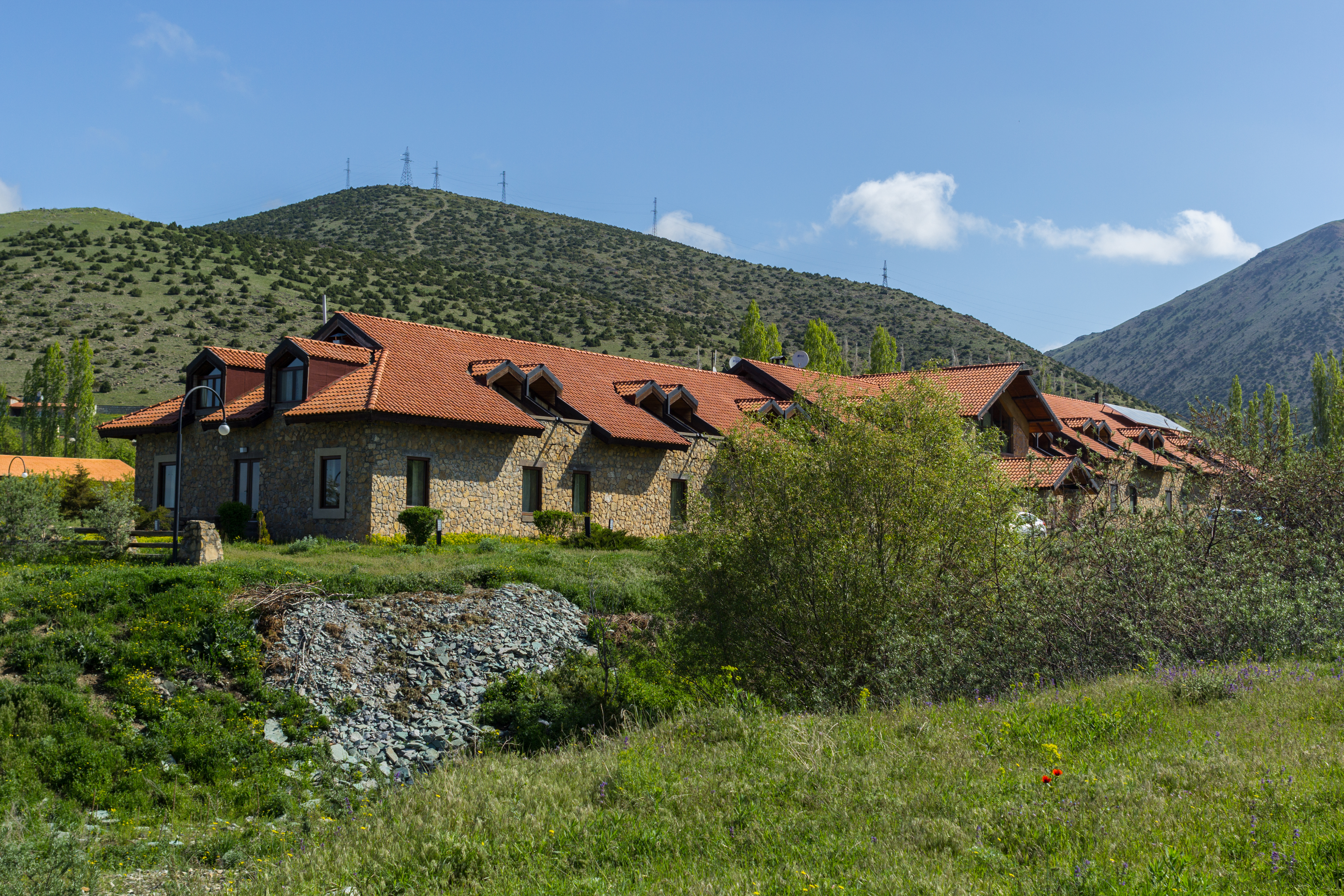
Hotel premises from the main road

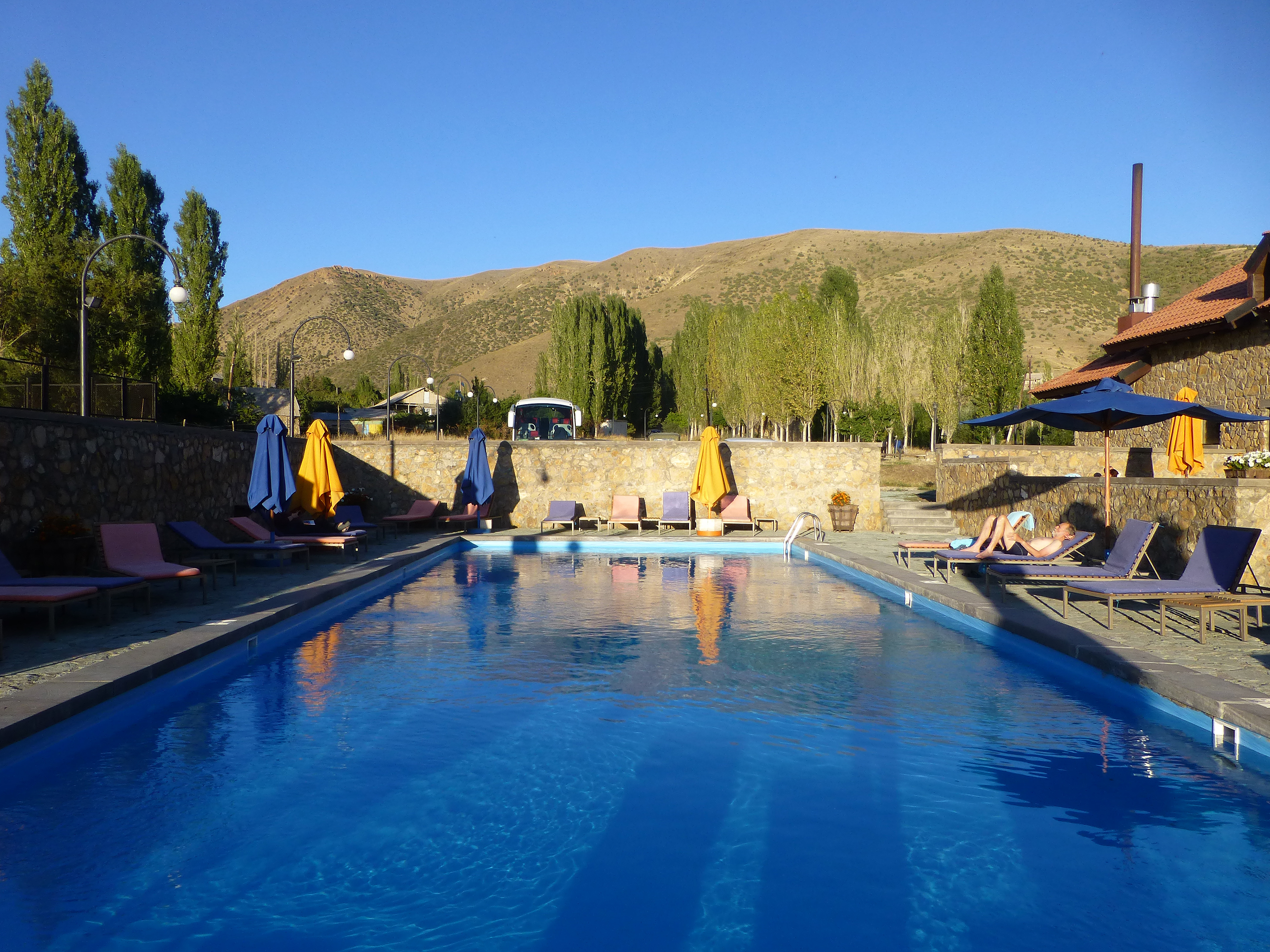
Hotel pool with a mountain view
