= Berdkunk =

Berdkunk Բերդկունք
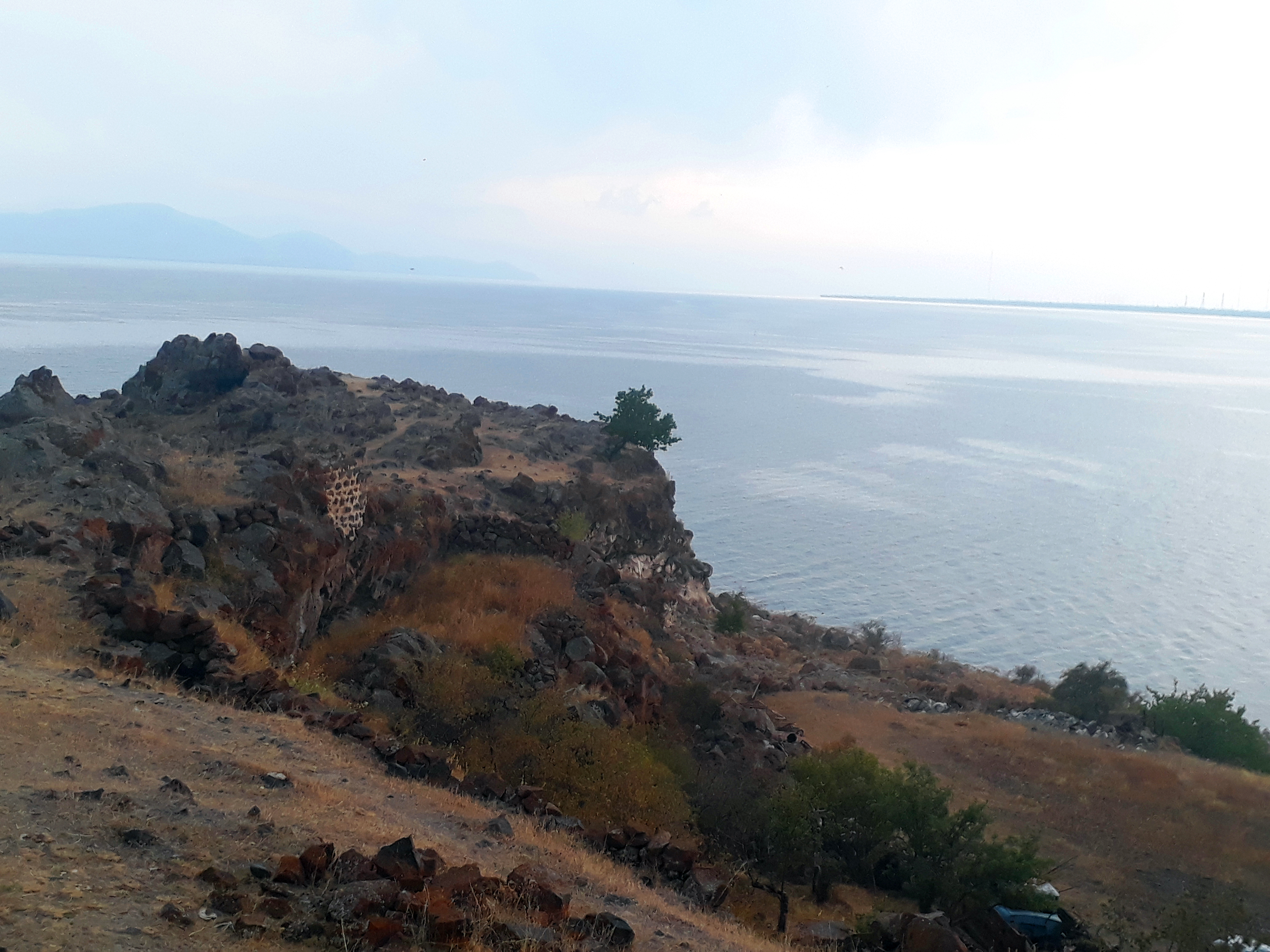
- Scenery around Berdkunk Fortress

- Location within Armenia Location within Gegharkunik
- Coordinates: 40°26′40″N 45°06′02″E
- Country: Armenia
- Province: Gegharkunik
- Municipality: Gavar
- Elevation: 1,930 m (6,330 ft)

Population (2011)
  - Total: 296
- Time zone: UTC+4 (AMT)

Berdkunk (Armenian: Բերդկունք) is a village in the Gavar Municipality of the Gegharkunik Province of Armenia.

== Etymology ==
The village was previously known as Aghkala or Aghgala (Azerbaijani: Ağqala; Russian: Агкала; Armenian: Աղկալա), consisting of Turkic agh (ağ, meaning "white") and Arabic gala (qala, meaning "castle" or "tower"). Berdkunk is a combination of two words in Armenian: berd (բերդ, meaning "fortress") and kunk (կունք, meaning "place" or "foundation").

== History ==
The village was once a transit point on the ancient road between Dvin and Partev. There are cyclopean fortresses nearby with megalithic tombs. One of the fortresses in particular, Berdkunk Fortress (also known as Ishkhanats Amrots and Spitak Berd lit. 'White fortress'), is located along the eastern edge of the village and was built in the 10th century BC. There is also an 11–12th century church, a 12–20th century cemetery, and 16–17th century tombstones in the village.

Berdkunk, then known as Aghkala, was part of the Nor Bayazet uezd of the Erivan Governorate within the Russian Empire. Bournoutian presents the statistics of the village in the early 20th century as follows:

Ownership	Treasury
Inhabited space	27 desyatinas (0.44 sq km)
Unirrigated plowed fields	633 desyatinas (10.37 sq km)
Yaylaks	233 desyatinas (3.82 sq km)
Total land	893 desyatinas (14.63 sq km)
Total households	62 (All Tatar (later known as Azerbaijani))
Total income	1,436.50 rubles
Total land taxes	320.12 rubles
Army tax	18.87 rubles
Upkeep of officials	215.39 rubles
Total revenue	554.38 rubles
Large livestock	620
Small livestock	990

== Economy ==
The population of the village is engaged with animal husbandry, cultivation of forage crops and potatoes.

== Demographics ==
The population of the village since 1831 is as follows:

Year	Population	Note
1831	39	100% Muslim
1873	191	100% Tatar (later known as Azerbaijani)
1886	253	100% Tatar (later known as Azerbaijani)
1897	331	100% Muslim
1904	424	
1914	507	Mainly Tatar. Also recorded as 448
1916	520	
1919	0	Formerly Turkish
1922	34	31 Armenians, 3 Turkish-Tatars
1926	224	105 Armenians, 76 Turks, 43 others
1931	368	202 Turks, 111 Armenians, 55 others
2001	253	
2004	265	
2011	296	

== Gallery ==
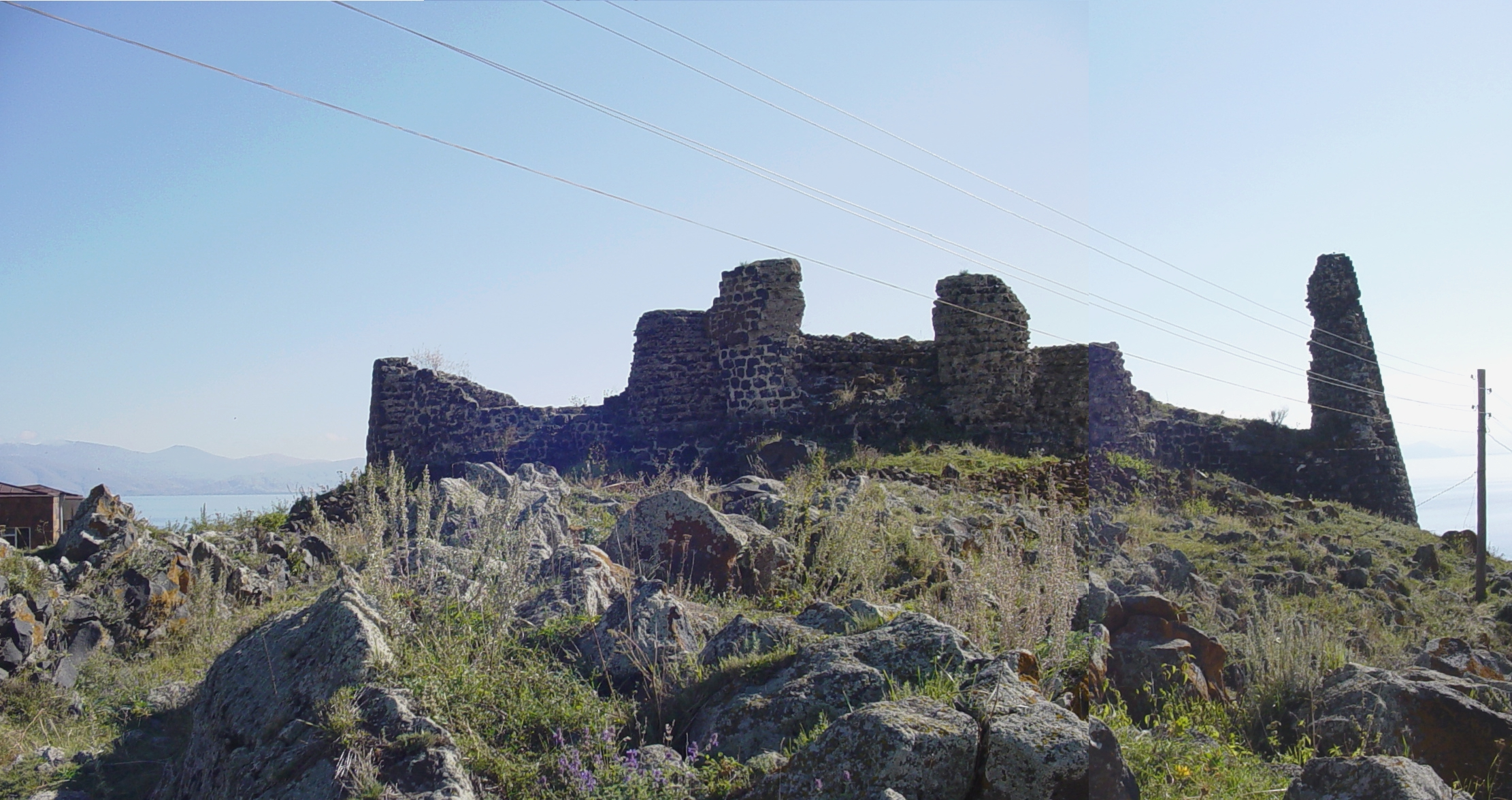
Front view of Berdkunk Fortress

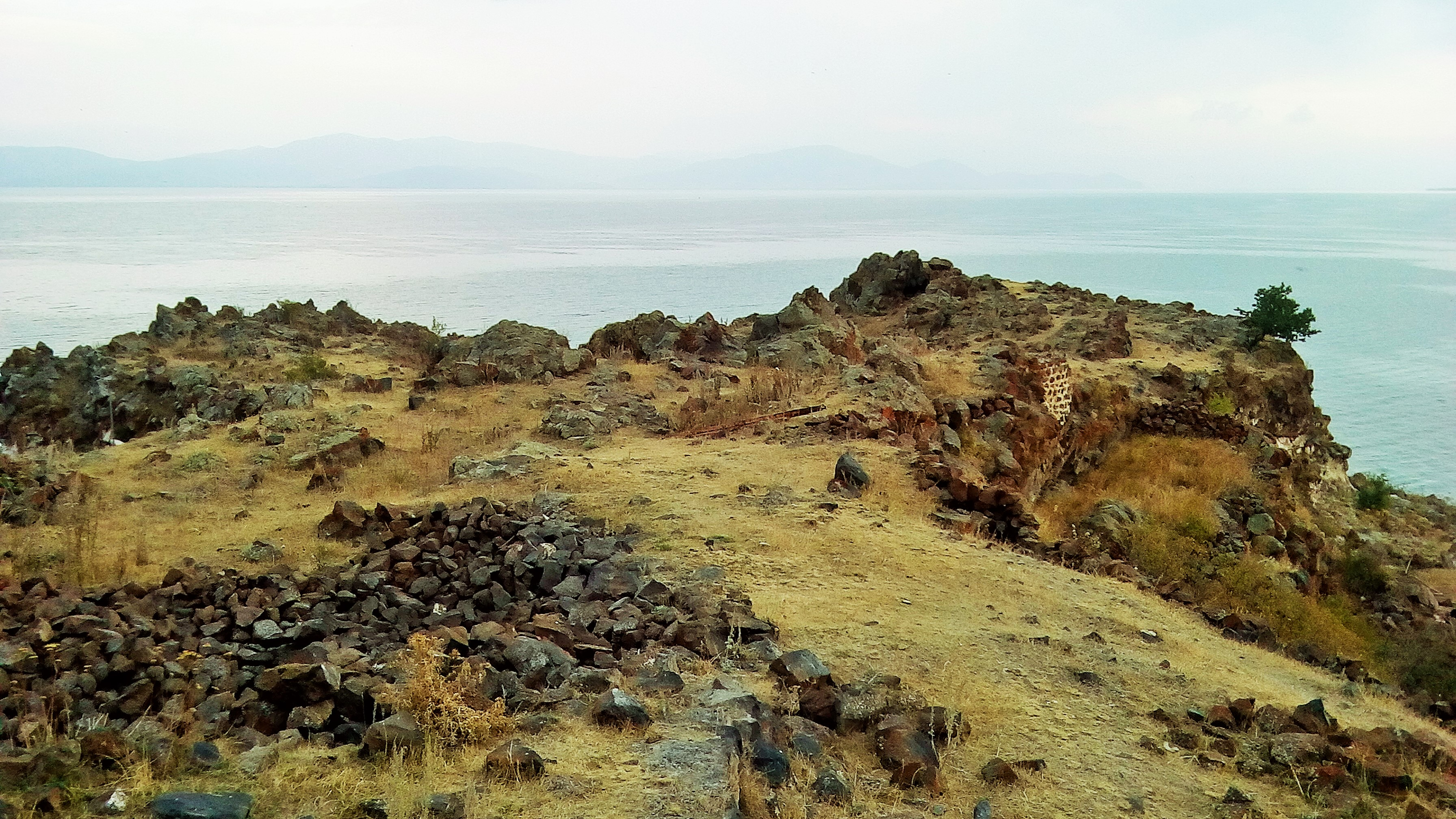
A view of Lake Sevan and Berdkunk Fortress

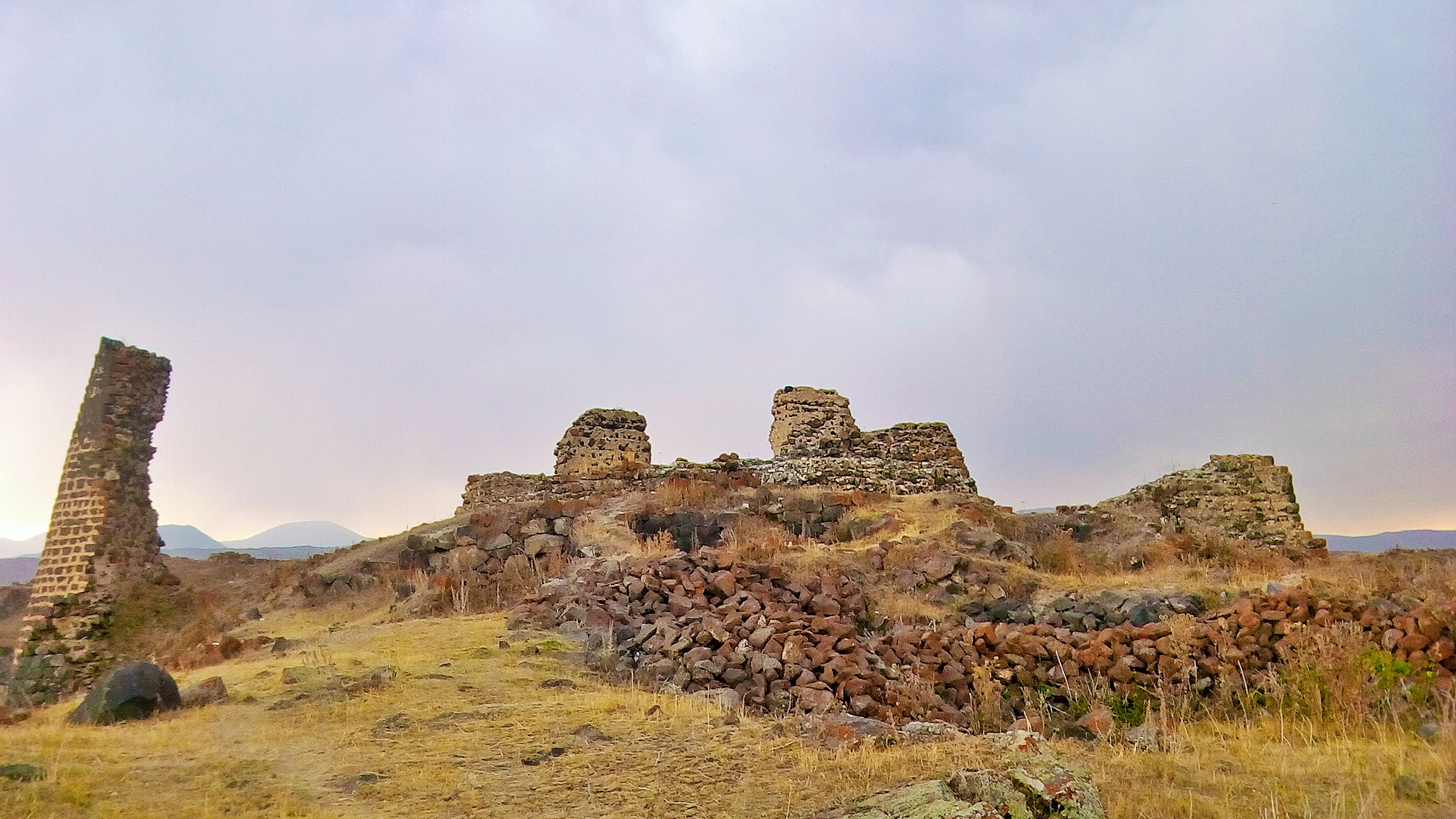
Berdkunk Fortress
