= Yuxarı Salamabad =

- Location within Azerbaijan
- Coordinates: 40°42′N 47°13′E
- Country: Azerbaijan
- City: Yevlakh
- Municipality: Xaldan
- Time zone: UTC+4 (AZT)
  - Summer (DST): UTC+5 (AZT)

Yuxarı Salamabad (also, Salamabad and Yukhary Salamabad) is a village in the Yevlakh Rayon of Azerbaijan. The village forms part of the municipality of Xaldan.
