= Lake Sevan =

Large Alpine lake in Armenia

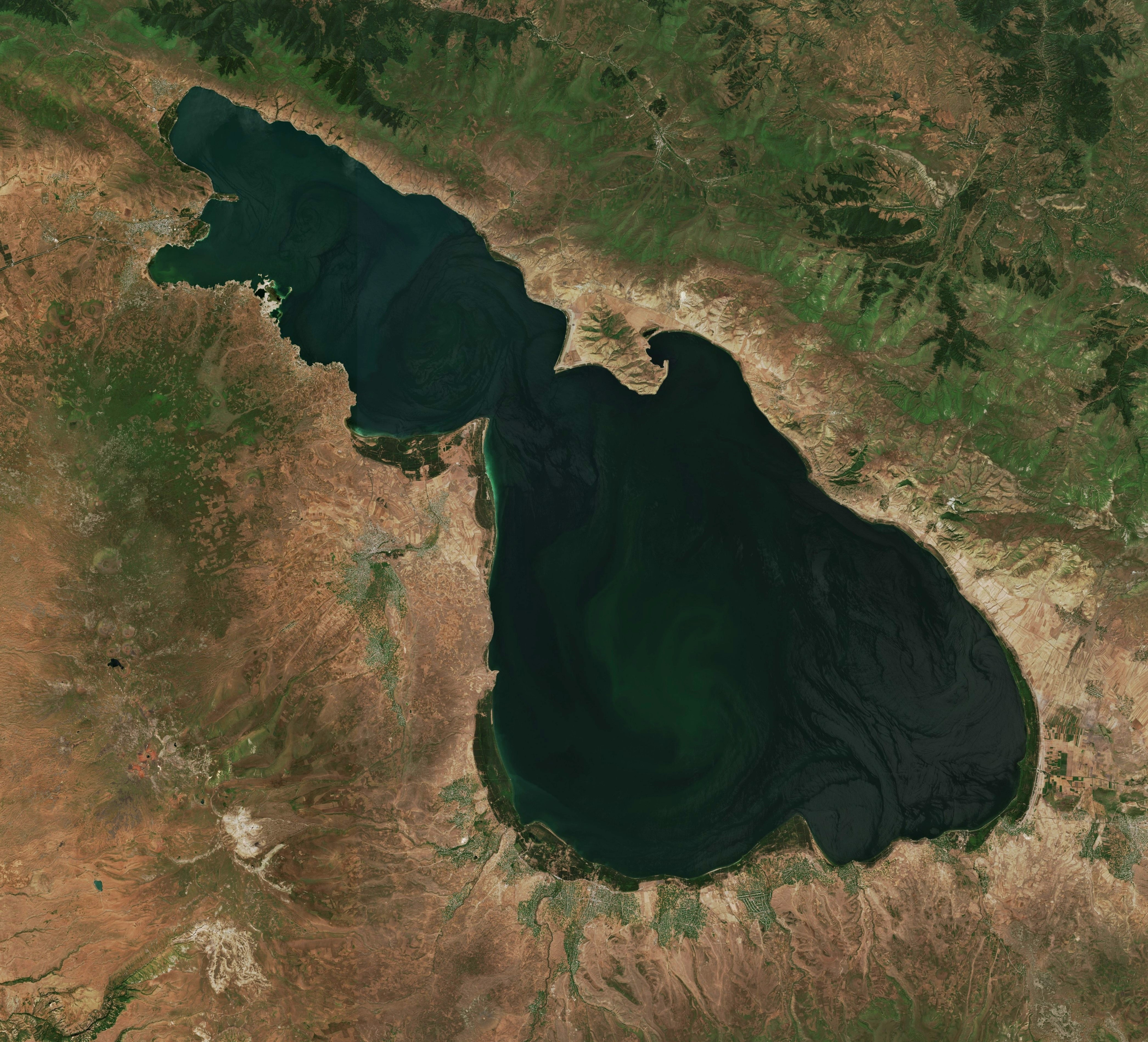
- Satellite image of the lake by Sentinel-2A

- Location within Armenia Location within Gegharkunik Location within Caucasus Mountains Location within Europe Location within Asia
- Interactive map of Lake Sevan
- Location: Gegharkunik Province, Armenia
- Coordinates: 40°19′N 45°21′E
- Primary inflows: 28 rivers and streams
- Primary outflows: evaporation: 85–90%, Hrazdan River: 10–15%
- Basin countries: Armenia
- Managing agency: Ministry of Environment
- Max. length: 74 km (46 mi)
- Max. width: 32 km (20 mi)
- Surface area: 1,242 km^{2} (480 sq mi)
- Average depth: 26.8 m (88 ft)
- Max. depth: 79.4 m (260 ft)
- Water volume: 33.2 km^{3} (26,900,000 acre⋅ft)
- Salinity: 0.7%
- Surface elevation: 1,900.44 m (6,235.0 ft) (2012)
- Islands: formerly 1 (now a peninsula)
- Sections/sub-basins: 2 (Major Sevan, Minor Sevan)
- Settlements: Gavar, Sevan, Martuni, Vardenis

IUCN Category II (National Park)
- Official name: Sevan National Park
- Designated: 14 March 1978

Ramsar Wetland
- Official name: Lake Sevan
- Designated: 6 July 1993
- Reference no.: 620

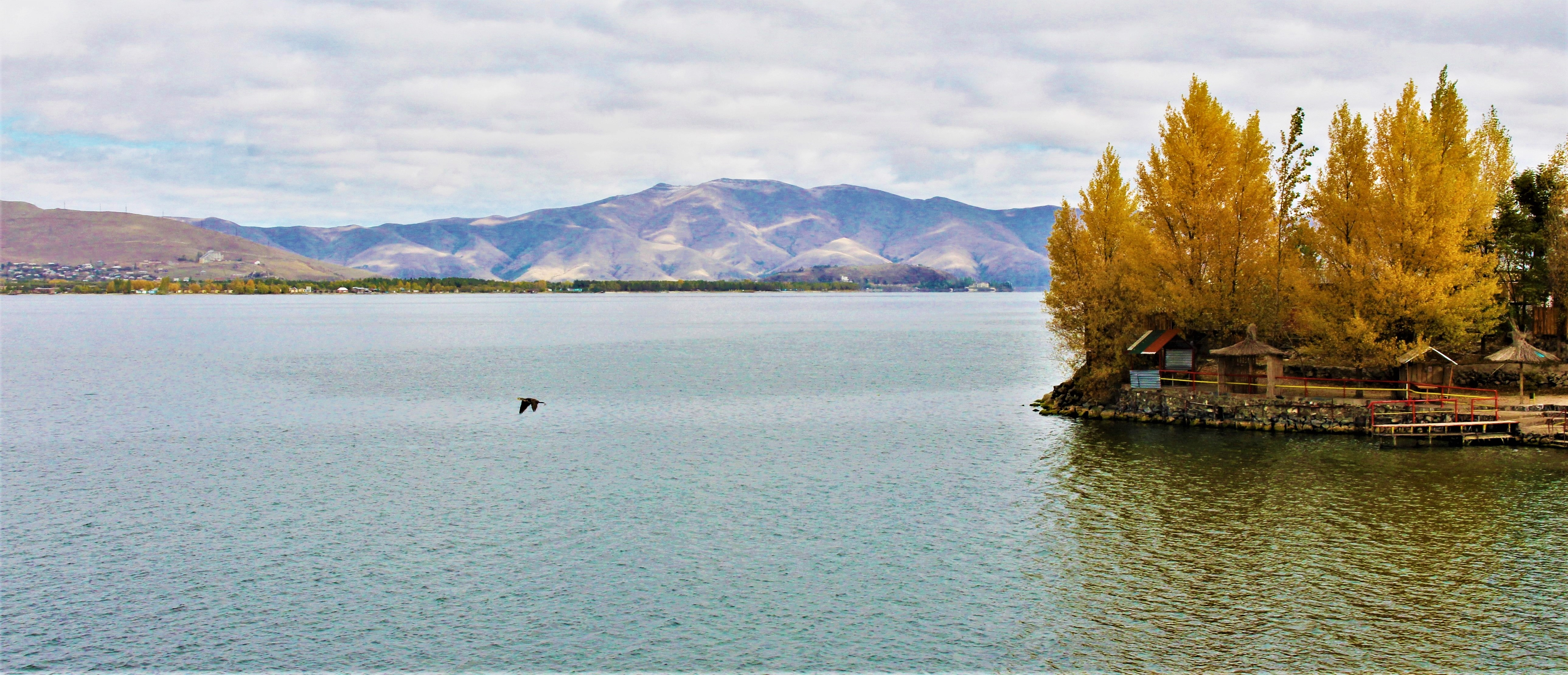
Lake Sevan, 2019

Lake Sevan (Armenian: Սևանա լիճ, romanized: Sevana lich) is the largest body of water in Armenia and the broader Caucasus region. It is one of the largest freshwater alpine lakes in Eurasia. The lake is situated in Gegharkunik Province, at an altitude of 1,900 m (6,234 ft) above sea level. It is fed by 28 rivers and streams. 10% of this incoming water is drained by the Hrazdan River, while the remaining 90% evaporates.

The total surface area of its basin is about 5,000 km^{2} (1,900 sq mi), which makes up 1/6 of Armenia's territory. The lake itself is 1,242 km^{2} (480 sq mi), and the volume is 32.8 km^{3} (7.9 cu mi).

Lake Sevan has significant economic, cultural, and recreational value. Sevan Island was the lake's sole major island and is the site of Sevanavank, a monastery built in the period of Medieval Armenia. Due to falling water levels, the island is now a peninsula. The lake provides some 90% of the fish and 80% of the crayfish catch of Armenia.

Lake Sevan was heavily exploited for irrigation of the Ararat plain and hydroelectric power generation during the Soviet period. Consequently, its water level decreased by around 20 m (66 ft) and its volume reduced by more than 40%. Later, two tunnels were built to divert water from highland rivers to the lake. Before human intervention dramatically changed the lake's ecosystem, the lake was at an altitude of 1,916 m (6,286 ft) above sea level, 95 m (312 ft) deep, covered an area of 1,416 km^{2} (547 sq mi) (5% of Armenia's entire area), and had a volume of 58.5 km^{3} (14.0 cu mi).

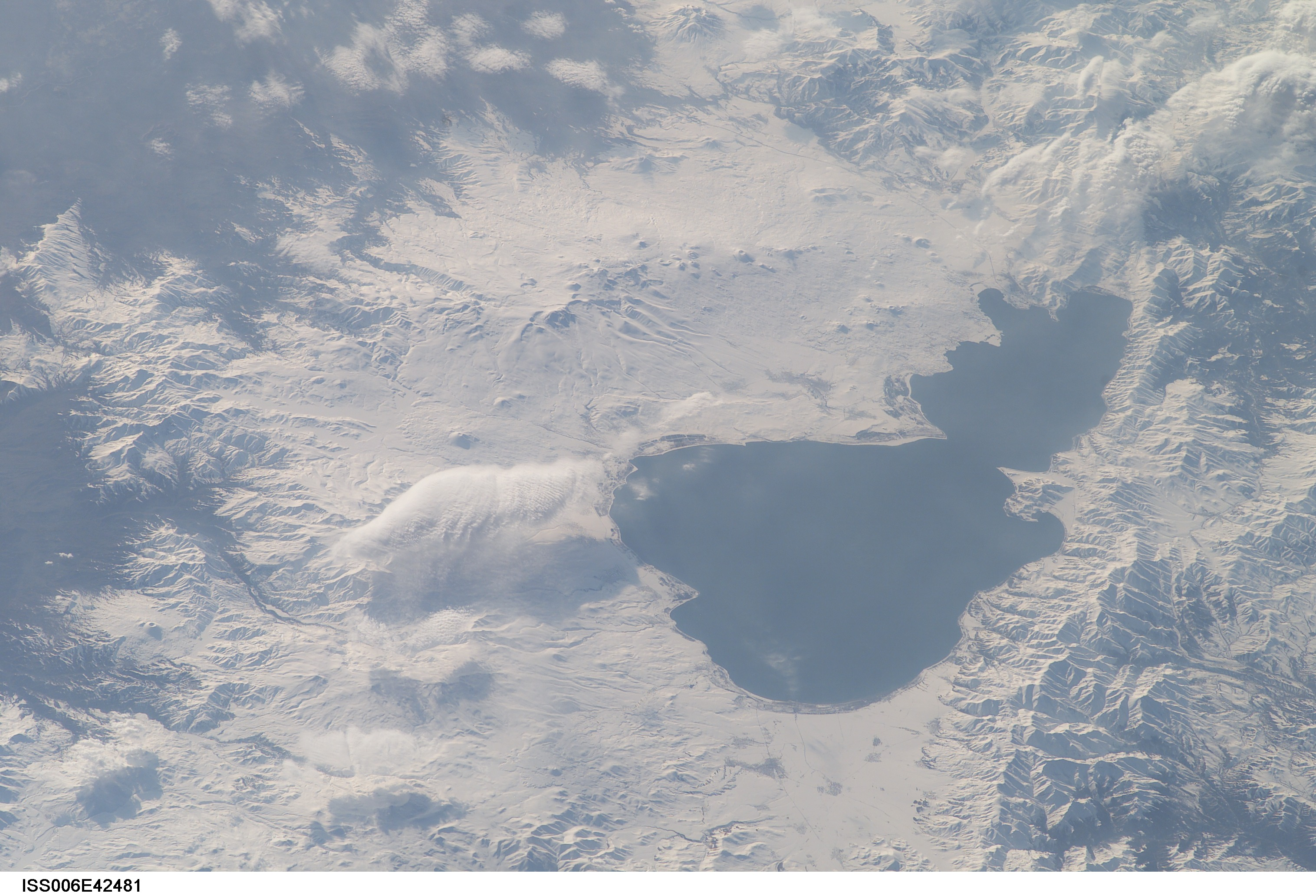
View of Armenia with Sevan taken during ISS Expedition 6

== Etymology ==
In Medieval Armenia, "Sevan" was the name of the lake's major island (now a peninsula) and its monastery. In the 19th and early 20th centuries, Russian and European sources sometimes referred to the lake as Sevanga or Sevang. According to folk etymology, Sevan is either a combination of Armenian sev ("black") and vank’ ("monastery"), sev ("black") + Van (i.e., Lake Van), or originates from the phrase sa ē vank'ə ("this is the monastery"). A scholarly explanation for the name, first suggested by Mikhail V. Nikolsky in 1896, is that Sevan originated from the Urartian word suinia, usually translated as "lake". It is attested on an 8th-century BC cuneiform inscription by the Urartian king Rusa I, found in Odzaberd, on the southern shore of the lake.

=== Historical names ===
The historical Armenian name of the lake, attested in early medieval texts, is Sea of Gegham (classical Armenian: ծով Գեղամայ, tsov Geghamay). (Note: modern Armenian: Գեղամա ծով, Geghama tsov. The name is mentioned by several medieval Armenian historians, including in Movses Khorenatsi's History of Armenia.) It is attested in Georgian as Gelakuni (გელაქუნი). Gevorg Jahukyan proposed an Urartian origin for Gegharkuni, attested as Uelikuni and Uelikuhi probably from ueli meaning "assembly".

In classical antiquity, the lake was known as Lychnitis (Ancient Greek: Λυχνῖτις). (Note: John Chardin, who visited the lake in 1673, called it the "Lake of Erivan" and wrote that it was called Deria-Shirin ("sweet lake") by Persians and Kiagar-couni-sou by Armenians.)

The Turkic name Gokcha or Gökche, which means "blue lake" was also used in Russian and British sources from the 17th to early 20th centuries.

== Significance ==
=== Cultural ===
Along with Lake Van and Lake Urmia, Sevan is considered one of the three great "seas" of historic Armenia. It is the only one within the boundaries of present-day Republic of Armenia, while the other two are located in Turkey and Iran, respectively. Lake Sevan is considered the "jewel" of Armenia and is "recognized as a national treasure" in the country. The 2001 Law on Lake Sevan defines the lake as "a strategic ecosystem valuable for its environmental, economical, social, scientific, cultural, aesthetic, medical, climatic, recreational, and spiritual value."

Chardin in 1673 noted the "extraordinary sweetness of the water", the "small Island in the middle of it; where stands a Monastery built about 600 years ago, of which the Prior is an Archbishop", and "nine sorts of fish which are there taken; the fairest trouts and carps which are eaten at Erivan being caught in this Lake".

Naturalist and traveler Friedrich Parrot, best known for ascending Mount Ararat in 1829 for the first time in history, wrote:

[the] sea enjoys a high celebrity for sanctity with all Armenians, far and near, on account of the many old, and now partly deserted religious houses on its shores; and with all the rest of the natives for its wonderful stores of fish, of which salmon-trout is peculiarly esteemed, being dried and carried to great distances for sale."

=== Economic ===
It is important for the Armenian economy: being the main source of irrigation water, Sevan provides low-cost electricity, fish, recreation, and tourism.

== Origin ==
Sevan originated during the early Quaternary when tectonic formation created a Palaeo-Sevan, ten times larger than the present lake. The current lake was formed some 25 to 30 thousand years ago.

== Human intervention ==
=== Exploitation and reduction ===
==== Background ====
Sevan was recognized as being a major potential water resource in the 19th century. Its high altitude location relative to the fertile Ararat plain and limited energy resources attracted engineers to explore ways of usage of the lake's water. In his 1910 booklet, Armenian engineer Sukias Manasserian proposed using Sevan's water for irrigation and hydroelectric power generation. He proposed draining the lake by 50 m (160 ft). Major Sevan would completely dry out, while Minor Sevan would have a surface area of 240 km^{2} (93 sq mi).

==== Implementation ====
Manasserian's proposal was adopted by the Soviet authorities in the 1930s when, under Joseph Stalin, the country was undergoing rapid industrialization. Works on the project started in 1933. The riverbed of Hrazdan was deepened through excavation. A tunnel was bored around 40 metres (130 ft) under the lake's surface. The tunnel was completed in 1949 and thereafter the Sevan's level began to drop significantly, at a rate over 1 metre (3 ft) per year. The water was used for irrigation and the Sevan–Hrazdan Cascade of six hydroelectric power stations on Hrazdan River.

Hydrometric indices of Lake Sevan before and after human intervention
Indices	1936	2000	Decrease
Height above sea level, m	1915.97	1896.65	-19.32
Lake surface, km^{2}	1416.2	1238.8	12.5%
Mean depth, m	41.3	26.8	35%
Maximum depth, m	98.7	79.7	19%
Water amount, km^{3}	58.48	33.20	43.2%

==== Effects ====
During the second half of the 20th century, the ecological condition of Lake Sevan underwent tangible changes and vast degradation due to reduced water level, increased eutrophication, and detrimental impact of human activity on the biological diversity of the lake. According to Babayan et al. the lake level dropped by 19.88 m (65.2 ft) by 2002, while the volume decreased by 43.8% (from 58.5 to 32.9 km^{3} [14.0 to 7.9 cu mi]). Due to the water level decrease, the quality of the water deteriorated, natural habitats were destroyed that meant loss of biodiversity. Vardanian wrote that drop of the lake level and the economic development in the basin brought about the change in hydro-chemical regime of the lake. The quality of the water deteriorated, water turbidity increased. The inner circulation of the water constituents as well as the circulation of the biological substances altered.

=== Reversal and recovery ===
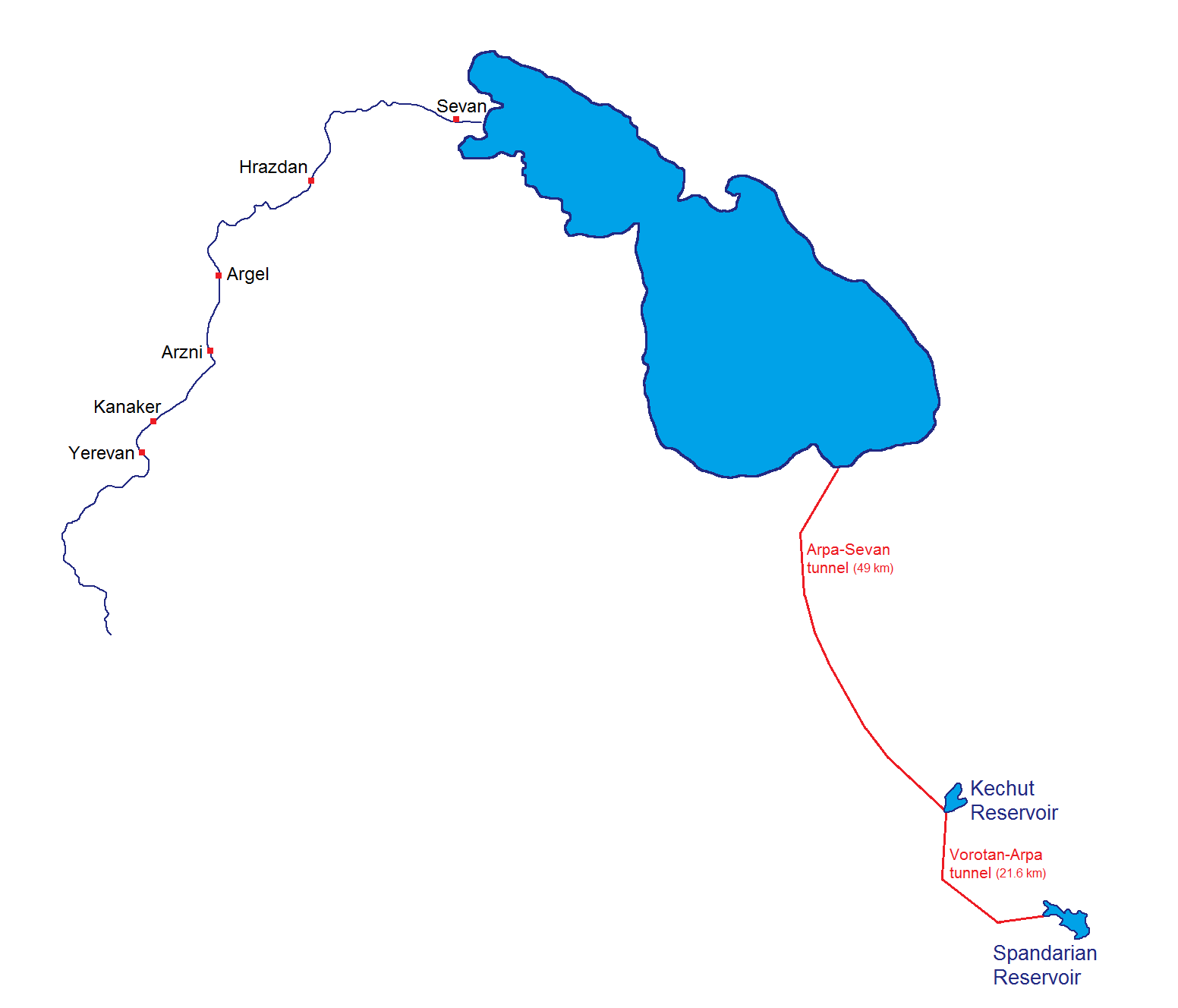
Map showing the two tunnels bringing water to the lake and the Hrazdan River and the six hydroelectric power stations built on it.

==== Arpa–Sevan tunnel ====
By the time of the Khrushchev Thaw, "it had become evident that the ecological and economic consequences of extensive exploitation of the water of Lake Sevan were too undesirable to continue in the same way." Soviet Armenian leaders soon agreed that "the best way to solve the issue would be to construct a canal to divert water from Armenia's Arpa River into the lake." To support this project, Yerevan needed assistance from the all-union budget. On Victory Day (9 May) 1961, Armenian officials, led by First Secretary Yakov Zarobyan, together with Marshal Ivan Bagramyan, met with Nikita Khrushchev at the lake to discuss the Arpa-Sevan proposal. Guided by advice from Khrushchev's close ally Anastas Mikoyan, the Armenian leadership managed to persuade Khrushchev to support the project, "estimated to be 480 million rubles (in old price values)."

The plan for the Arpa-Sevan tunnel was approved on 12 August 1961 by the Council of Ministers of the Soviet Union. It envisioned diverting water from a reservoir of the Arpa River near Kechut through a 49 km (30 mi) long tunnel to the lake near Artsvanist. Armenian authorities "moved to begin the implementation of the project" on 29 August 1961. The tunnel was eventually completed in 1981 and continues to bring up to 200 million cubic metres (7.1 billion cubic feet) of water to Sevan per year. However, it is estimated that due to climate change, the outflow of the Arpa river will decrease by 22% by 2030.

==== Vorotan–Arpa tunnel ====
Since the water level in the lake did not rise as fast and as much, on 20 April 1981 the Council of Ministers of the Soviet Union made a decision for the construction of the Vorotan–Arpa tunnel. This 21.6 km (13.4 mi) long tunnel was begun from the Spandarian Reservoir on the Vorotan River further south from Kechut. Due to the Nagorno-Karabakh conflict and the 1988 earthquake in northwestern Armenia construction was halted. The tunnel was inaugurated on 26 April 2004. The Vorotan–Arpa tunnel brings an additional 165 million cubic metres (5.8 billion cubic feet) to the lake annually.

==== Increase in water level ====
After the construction of the two tunnels the water level began rising significantly since the mid-2000s. In 2007 it was reported that the water level had risen by 2.44 metres (8.0 ft) in the previous six years. It reached 1,900.04 m (6,233.7 ft) in October 2010. The government committee on Sevan forecasts that the level will reach 1,903.5 m (6,245 ft) by 2029.

Water level stood at 1900.44 m in November 2019.

== Population ==
Armenia's Gegharkunik Province shown in red

The Gegharkunik Province, which roughly corresponds to the lake's basin, had a population of 211,828 according to the 2011 Armenian census. The largest settlements in the province are: Gavar (20,765), Sevan (19,229), Martuni (12,894), Vardenis (12,685), Vardenik (9,880), Yeranos (6,119), Chambarak (5,660), Lchashen (5,054), Tsovagyugh (4,189).

== Tourism ==
=== Beaches ===
Lake Sevan has the only beaches in Armenia. They are a popular destination for the Armenians. Sevan's beaches provide a unique experience within the landlocked country for Armenians. The beaches adjacent to hotels are usually privatized. Numerous beaches are located along the entire lake shore. The most popular of them is a 2.5-kilometre (1 1/2 mi) stretch on the northern shore, extending northwest from the peninsula. Resorts include Harsnaqar Hotel, Best Western Bohemian Resort, and numerous smaller facilities. Activities include swimming, sunbathing, jet skiing, windsurfing, and sailing. The area also includes numerous campgrounds and picnic areas for daytime use. A less-developed beach destination stretches along the eastern shore from Tsovagyugh to Shorzha, with numerous small cabins at Shorzha. The Avan Marak Tsapatagh Hotel, a Tufenkian Heritage Hotel, is a luxury resort on the undeveloped southeastern shore of the lake near Tsapatagh.

The Armenian government pledged to "reduce the growing commercialization of rest at Lake Sevan that makes it unaffordable for most citizens struggling to find other beach options during hot Armenian summers." In 2011 the government established public beaches in the Sevan National Park's recreational zone. The first two public beaches were opened in July. Some 100,000 people visited the public beaches in summer of 2011. The beaches have free parking space, children's and sports playgrounds, toilets, medical aid stations, and rescue services. They are also equipped with beach couches. By 2014, the number of public beaches reached 11. Some 200,000 people took holiday there in 2014.

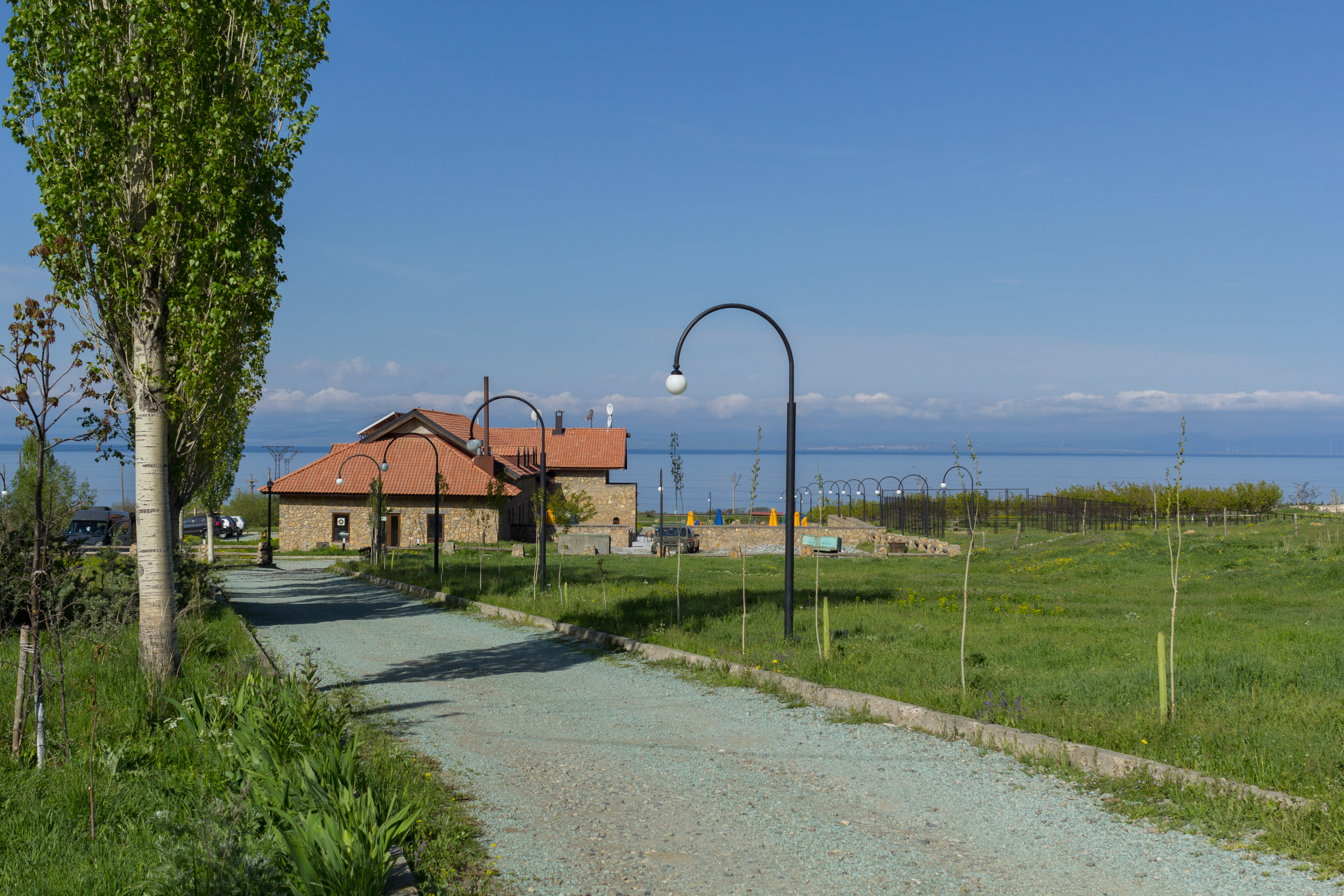
Tufenkian Avan Marak Tsapatagh Hotel (Tsapatagh)

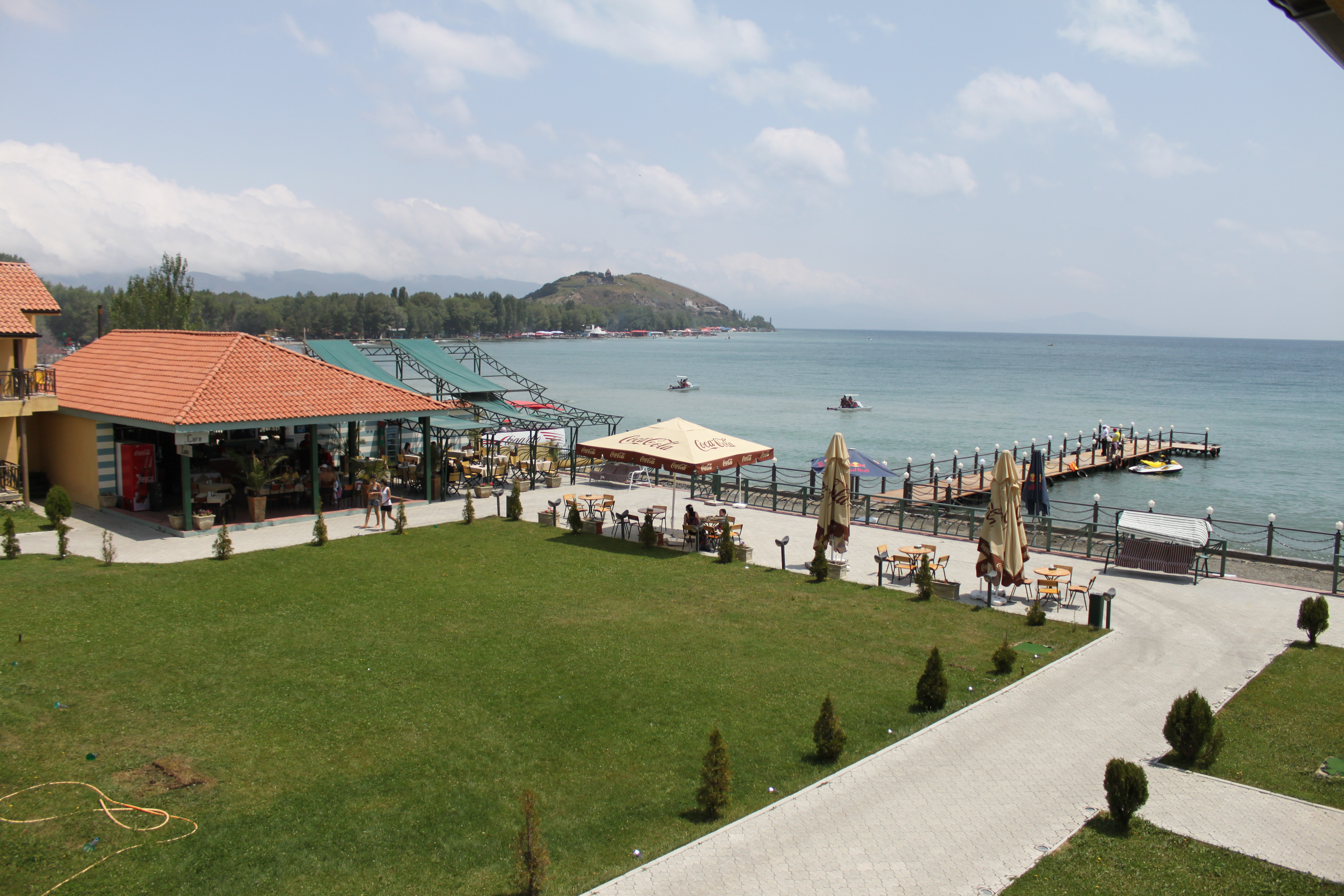
Best Western Bohemian Resort

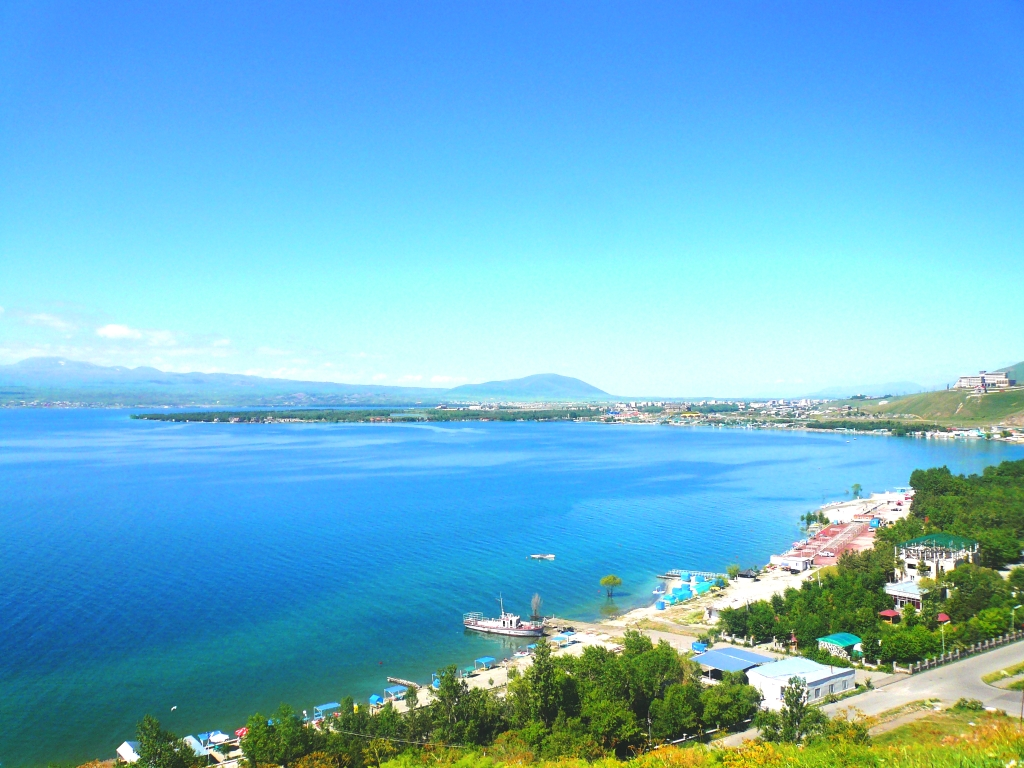
The beach of Sevan town

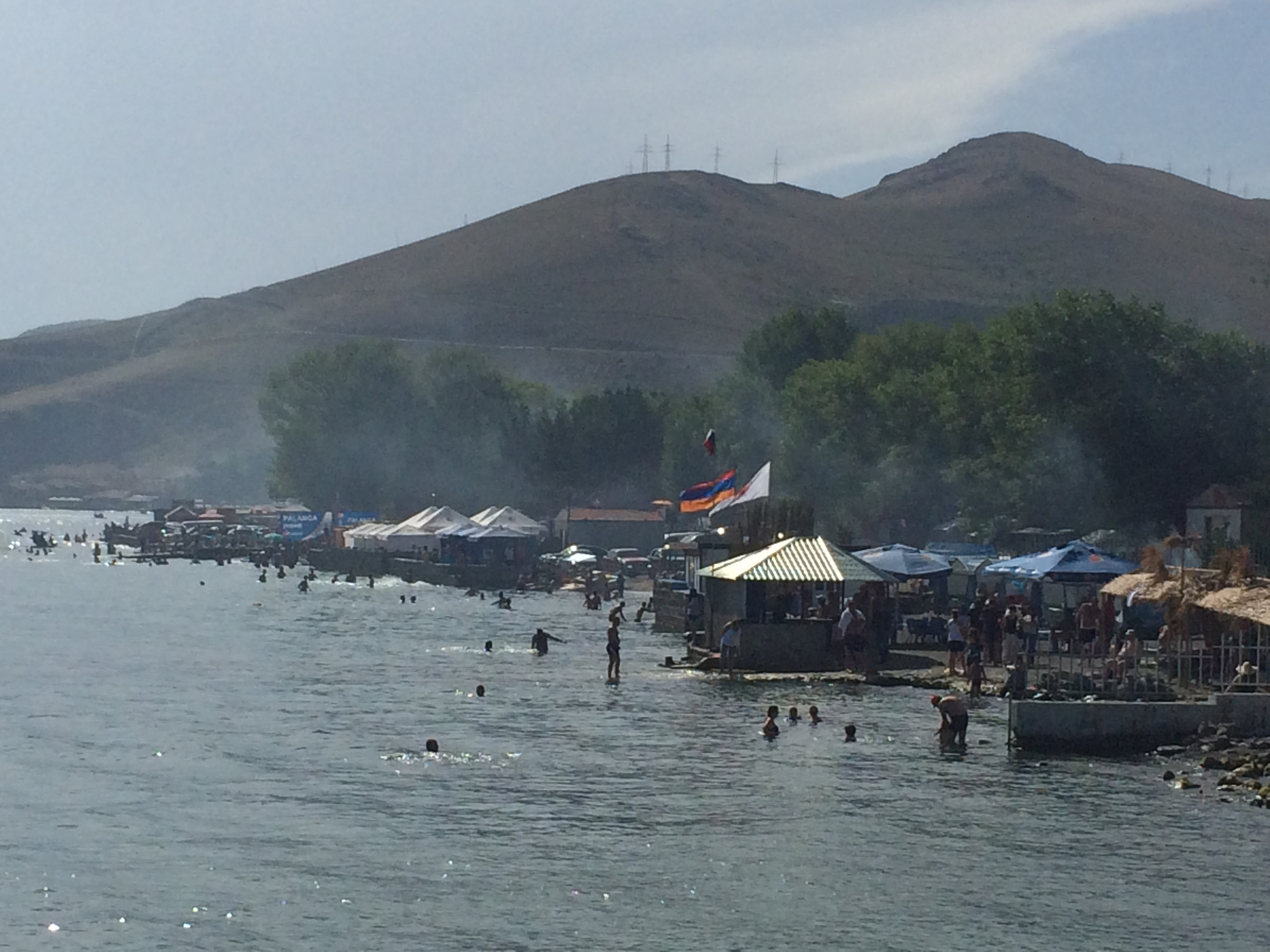

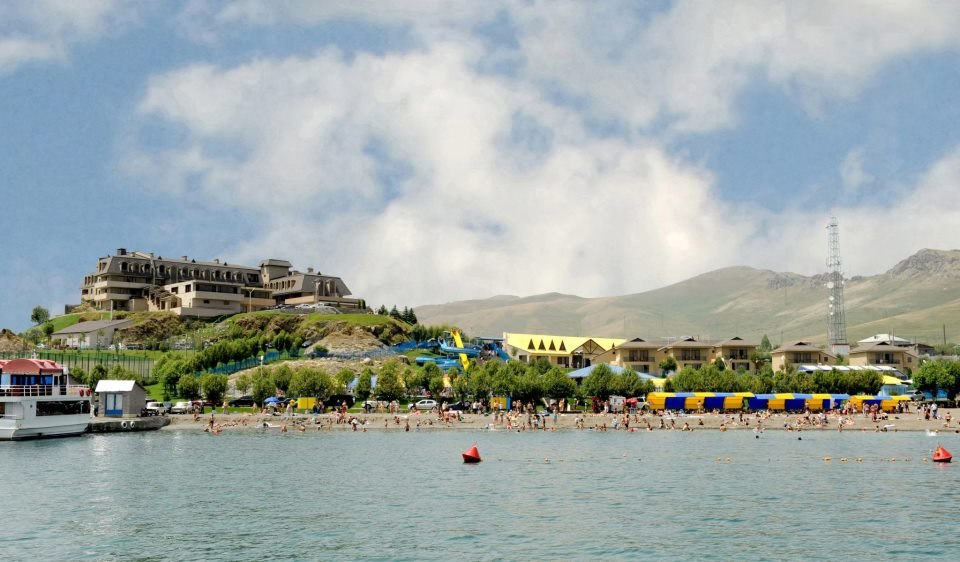
The Harsnaqar Hotel Complex
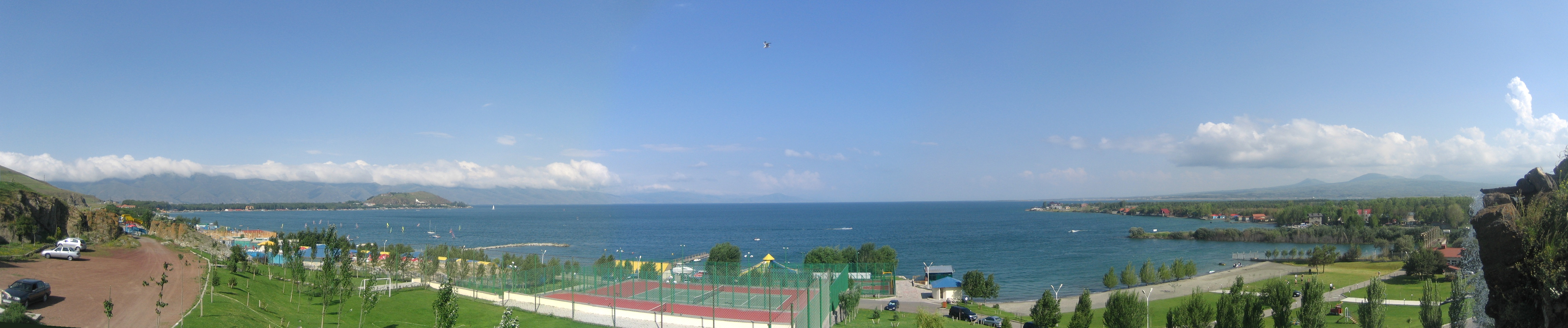
View from the northeastern shore near the city of Sevan

=== Sites of interest ===
The most famous cultural monument is the Sevanavank monastery located on the peninsula, which was until the mid-20th century an island. Another prominent monastery at the western shore is Hayravank, and further south, in the village of Noratus, is a field of khachkars; a cemetery with about 900 khachkars of different styles. Additional khachkars are found at Nerkin Getashen on the south coast.

In 2017, a Wikipedia globe was submerged in the lake to create an artificial reef.

==== Island ====
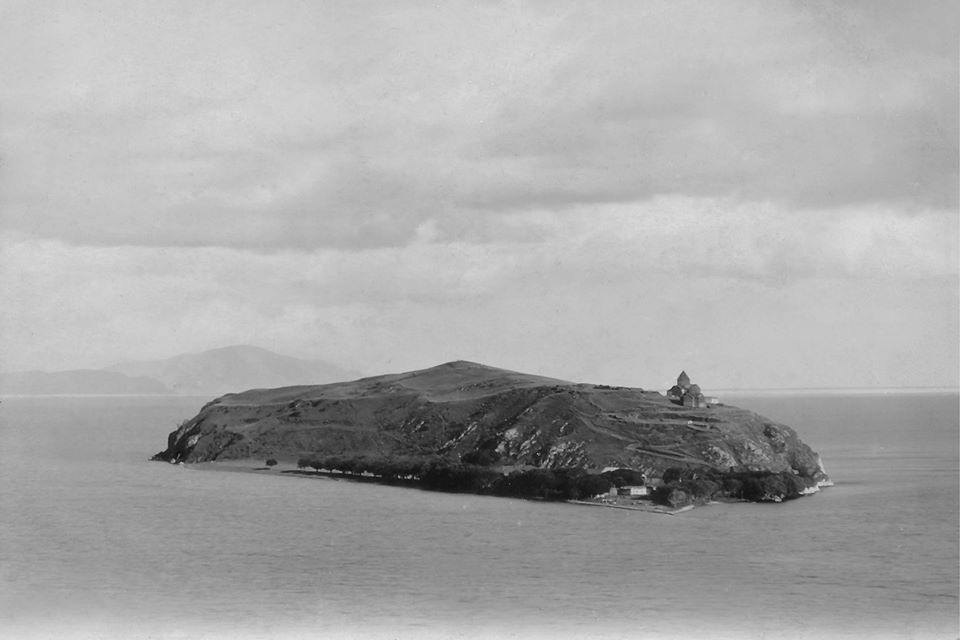
Sevan Island

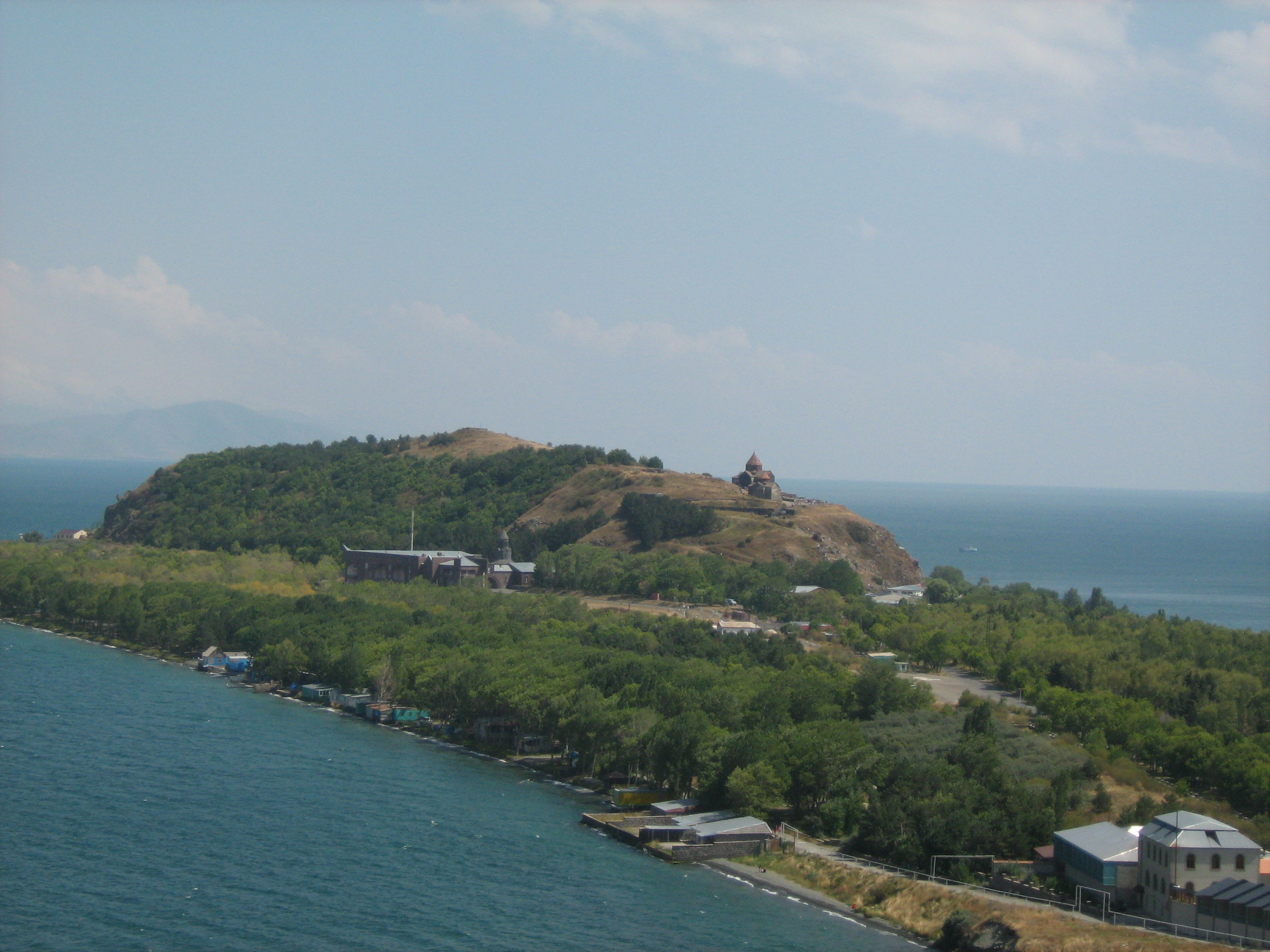
Sevan Island

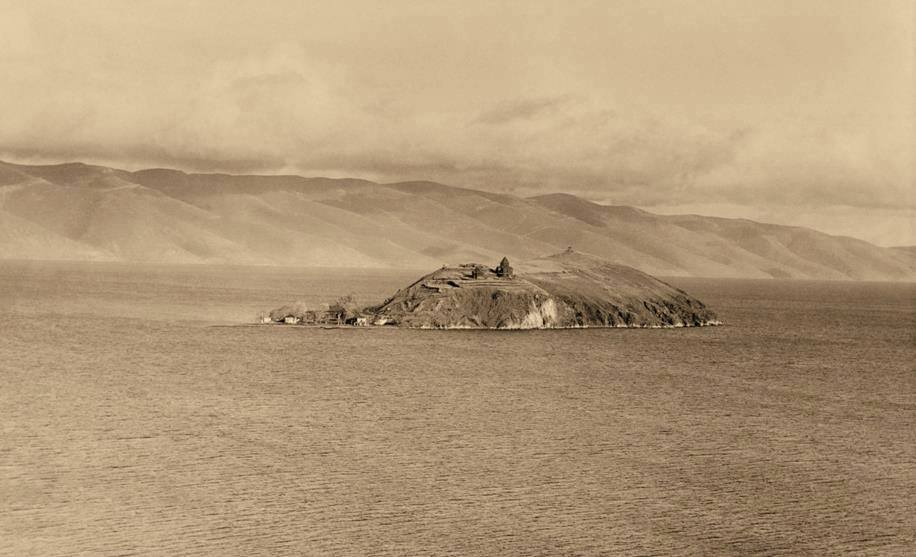
Sevan Island

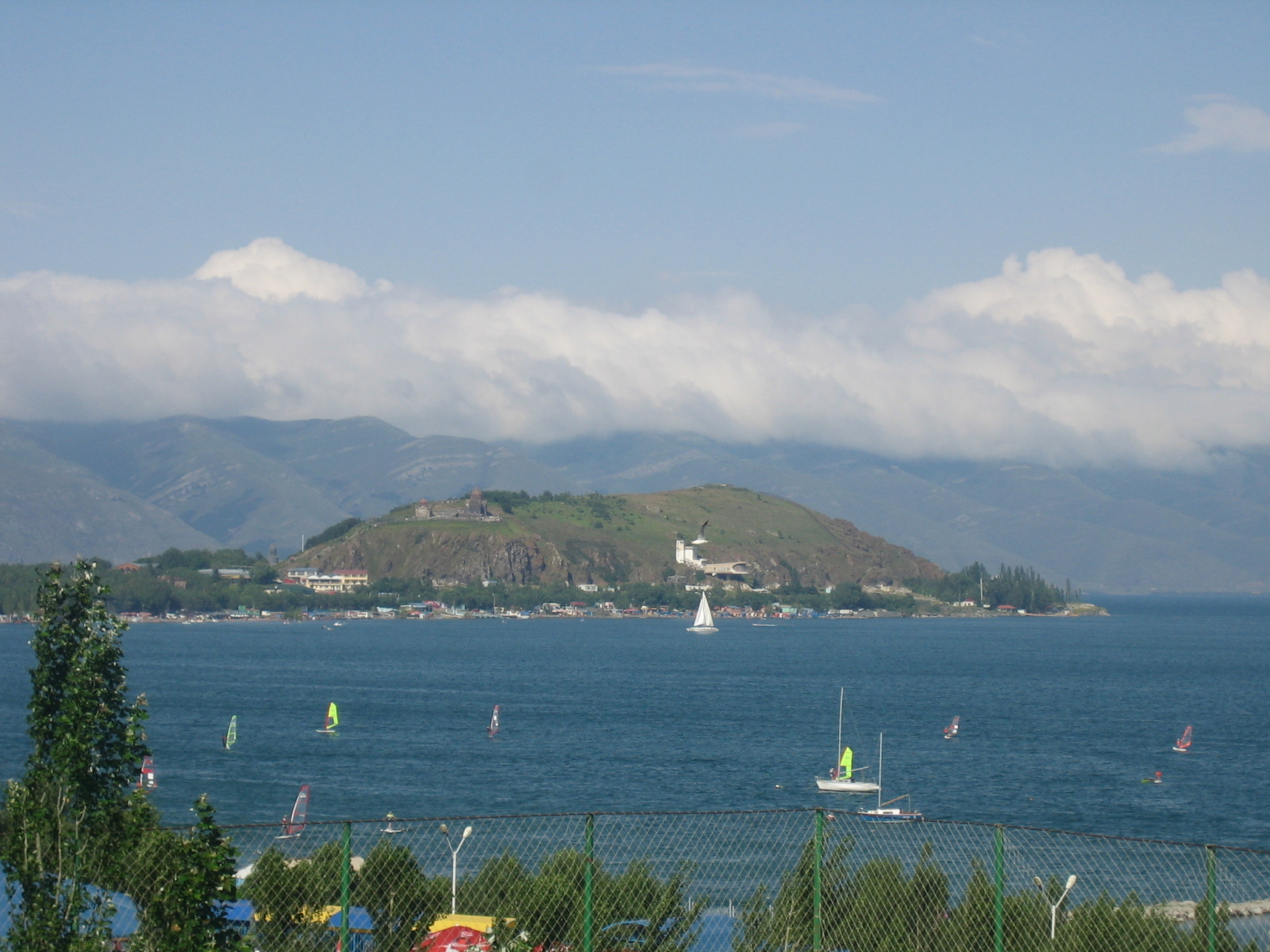
Sevan peninsula (formerly an island) in Lake Sevan
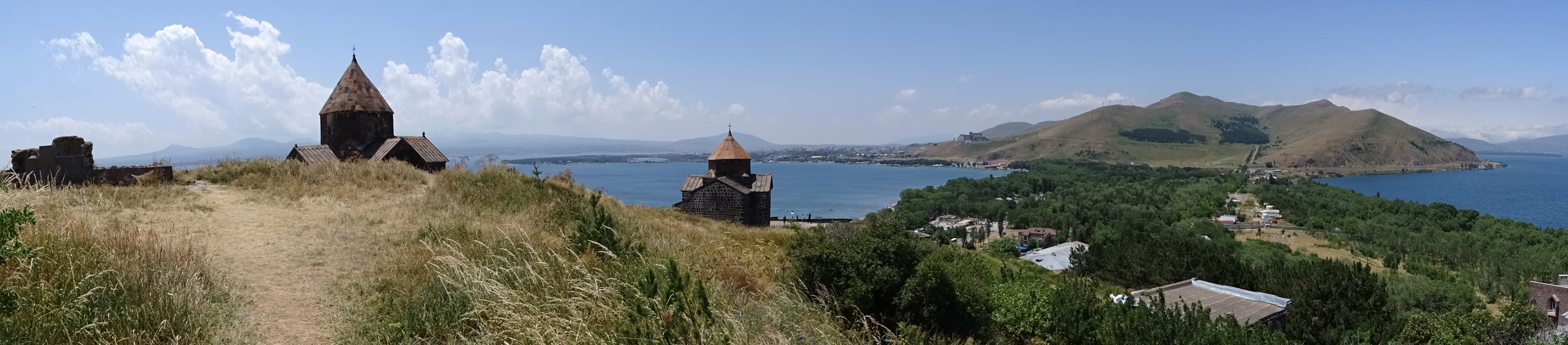
Sevan peninsula in 2015

== Fauna ==
=== Fish ===
Sevan trout (Salmo ischchan) is an endemic species of salmonid to the lake. It is endangered as some competitors were introduced into the lake, including common whitefish (Coregonus lavaretus) from Lake Ladoga, goldfish (Carrasius auratus), and crayfish (Astacus leptodactylus); if the Sevan trout is likely to become extinct in its "home" lake, it seems that it will survive in Issyk-Kul Lake (Kyrgyzstan), where it was introduced in the 1970s.

Due to anthropogenic impact, changes have occurred in all the biological components of the lake, including bacteria, benthos, and of course fish. Thus, the benthic mass increased tenfold in 1940, due to oligochaetes and chironomids. Today, the former prevail and multiply the oxygen-rich residue at the bottom of the lake.

The bojak and winter bakhtak varieties of the Sevan trout have already disappeared. The summer bakhtak occurs rarely; the gegharkuni is still capable of reproducing naturally. In 1980s, the quantity of Sevan koghak significantly decreased. Numerous reasons for this have been identified:

- The level of the water was lowered, the paths of rivers changed, and the trout (gegharkuni and Aestivalis species) lost their natural spawning places. Changes in the areas near the shore (mossing, disappearance of macrophyte plants) also had a negative impact on the trout lays. The trout spawn only in certain areas, with oxygen-rich underground water at the depth of 25–30 m (80–100 ft).
- Deoxidization of the bottom is extremely detrimental for salmon, which are used to more than 4 mg/L of O_{2}.
- In the last 10 years, poaching rapidly increased, which significantly reduced the number of fish in the lake.

=== Birds ===
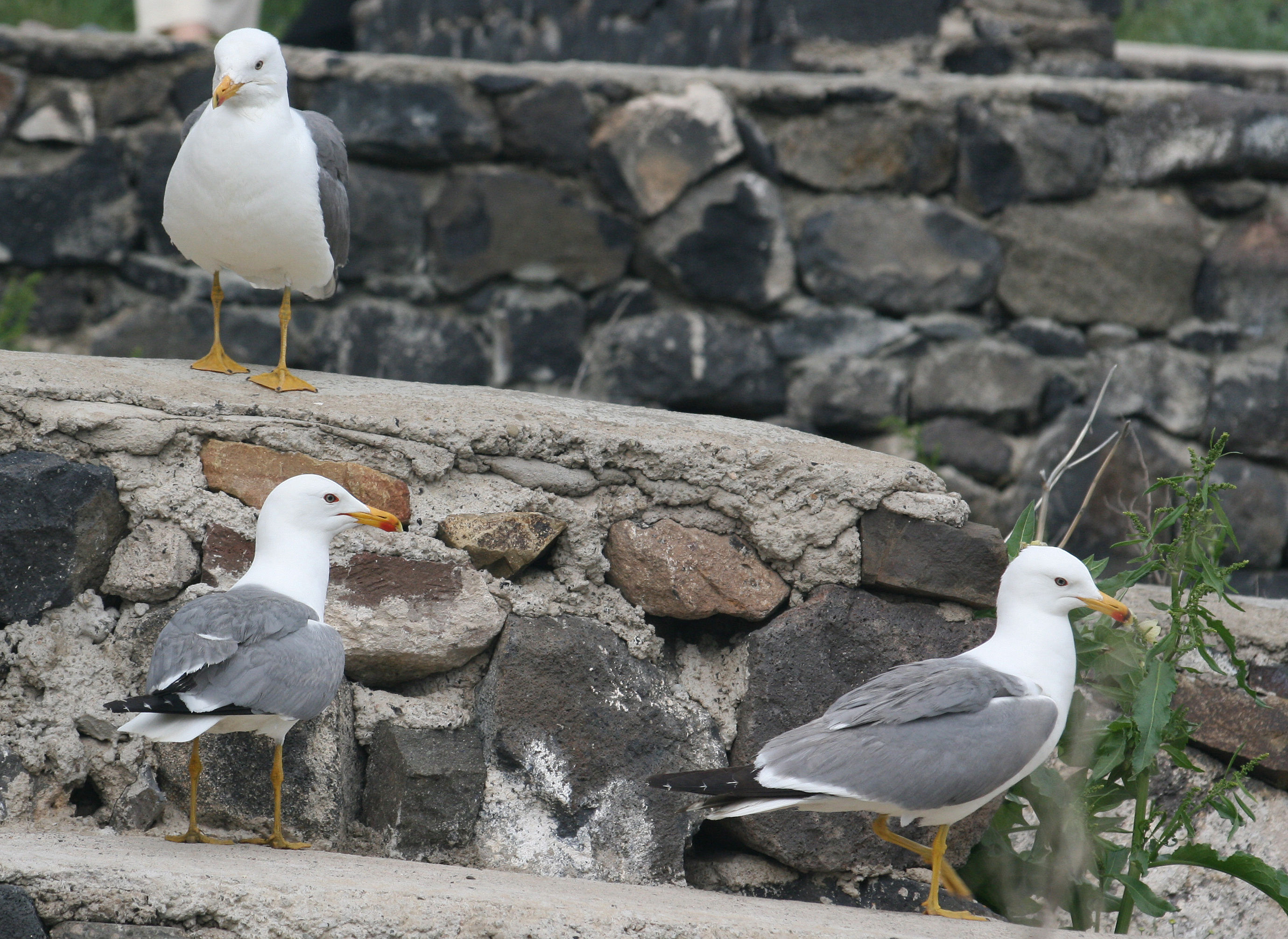
Armenian gull at Sevanavank monastery

The bird fauna of the lake and its vicinity makes over 200 species, out of which 95 species are breeders. The lake is an important breeding ground for the Armenian gull (Larus armenicus) with about 4,000–5,000 pairs. During migration the Lake is visited by wide variety of birds including raptors, such as Montagu's harrier (Circus pygargus) and steppe eagle (Aquila nipalensis), waterbirds such as red-crested pochard (Netta rufina) and ferruginous duck (Aythya nyroca), while during the wintering period the lake hosts another set of species such as Bewick's swan (Cygnus columbianus) and great black-headed gull (Larus ichthyaetus). Sometimes the lake is visited by lesser white-fronted goose (Anser erythropus), a very rare migrant in Armenia.

== Culture ==
There are a lot of historical monuments located on the coast of Sevan, ranging from prehistoric petroglyphs to various monasteries. The monasteries include Sevanavank, Vanevan, Kotavank and others. There are also many historical castles and fortresses on the coast, including Berdkunk Fortress, Odzaberd, and others.

=== Gallery ===
Sevanavank

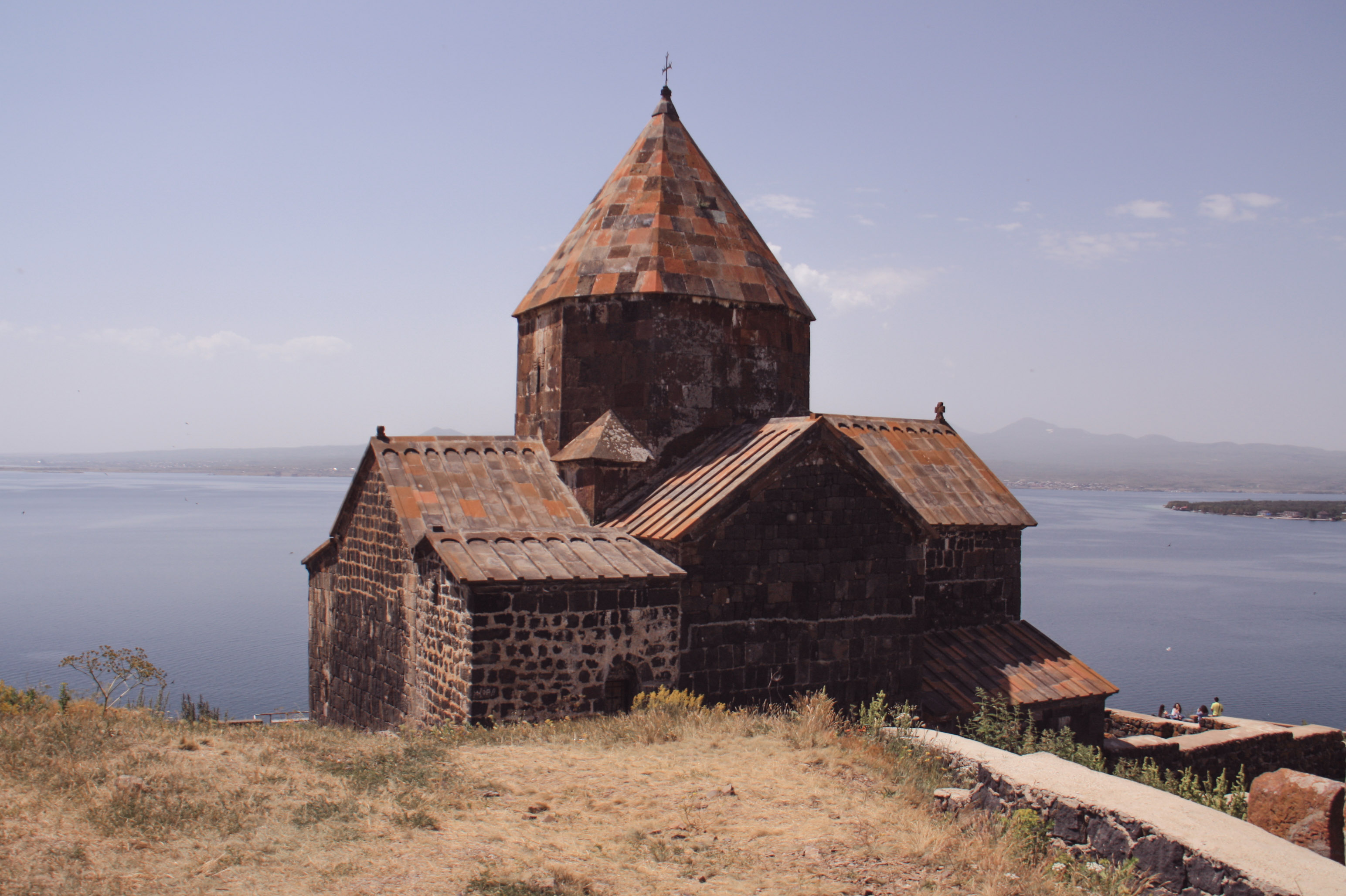
Vanevan

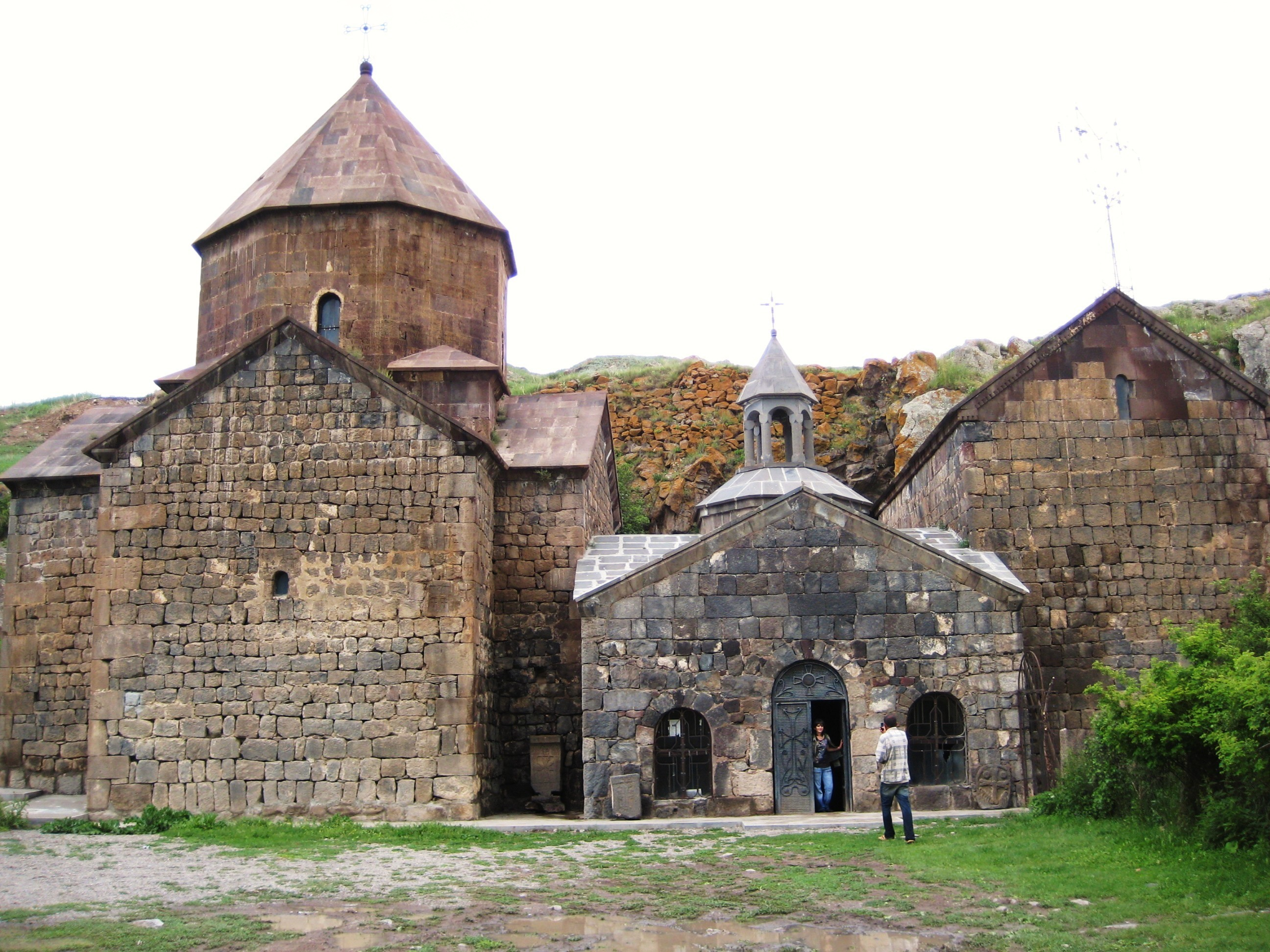
Kotavank

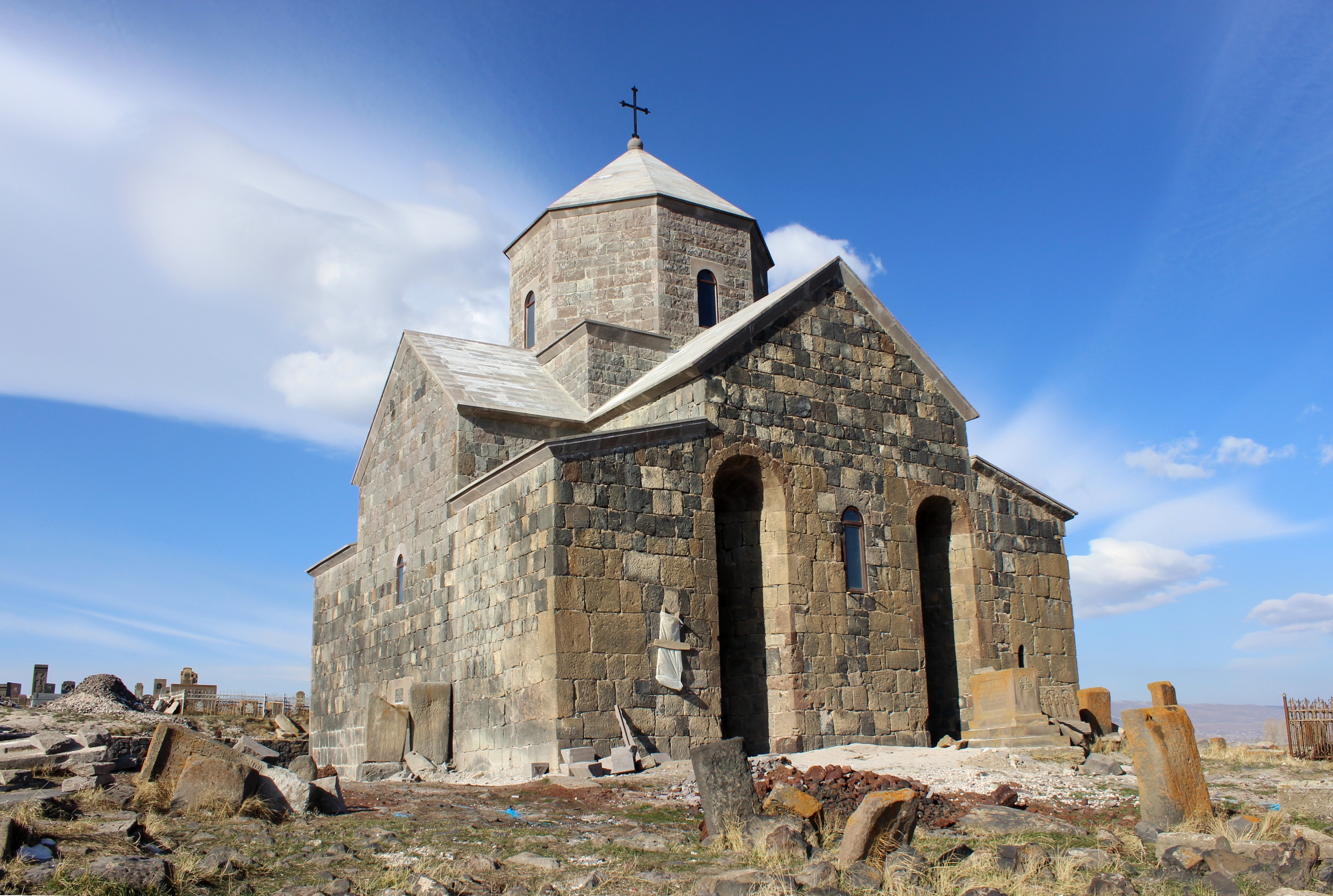
Berdkunk

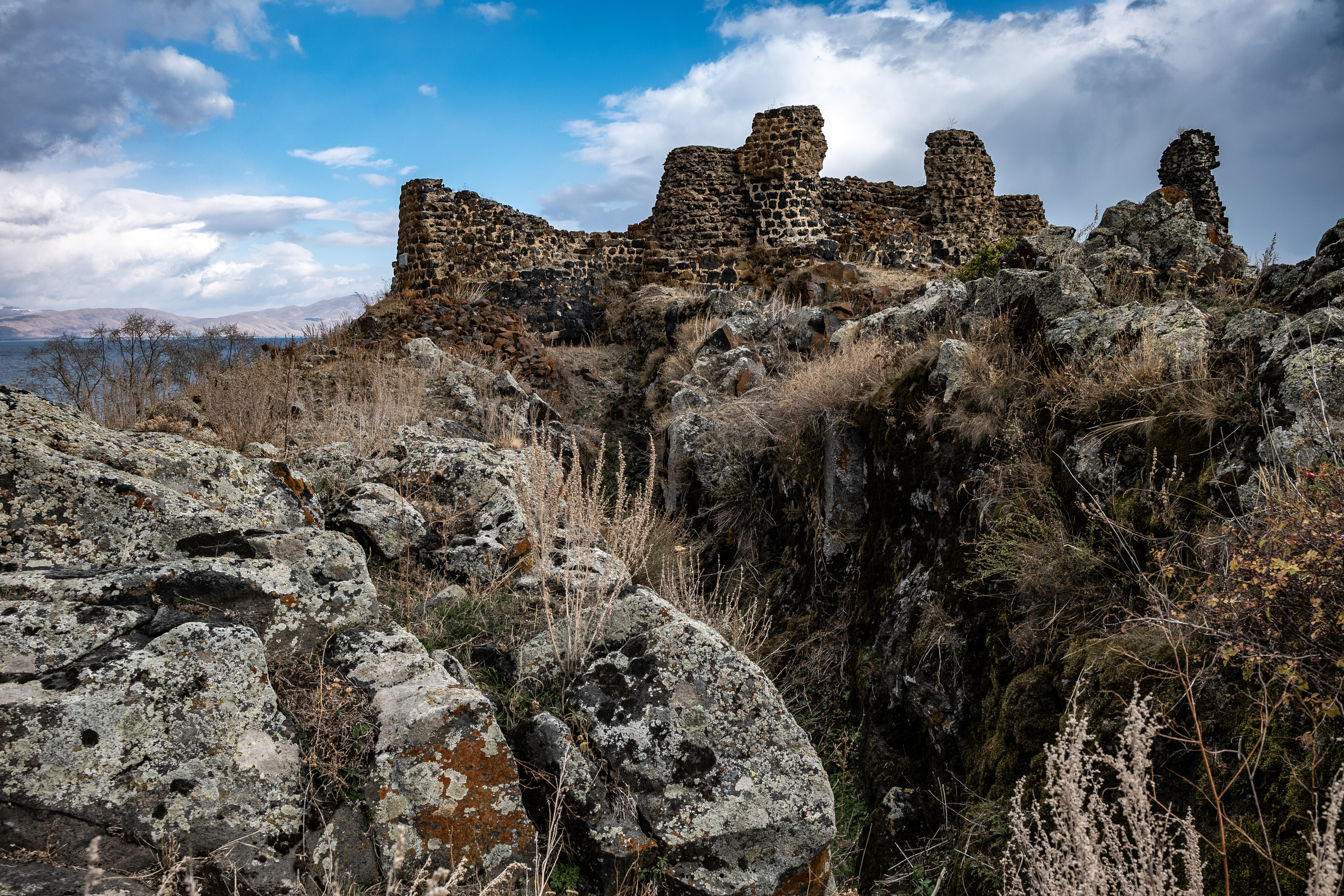
Odzaberd

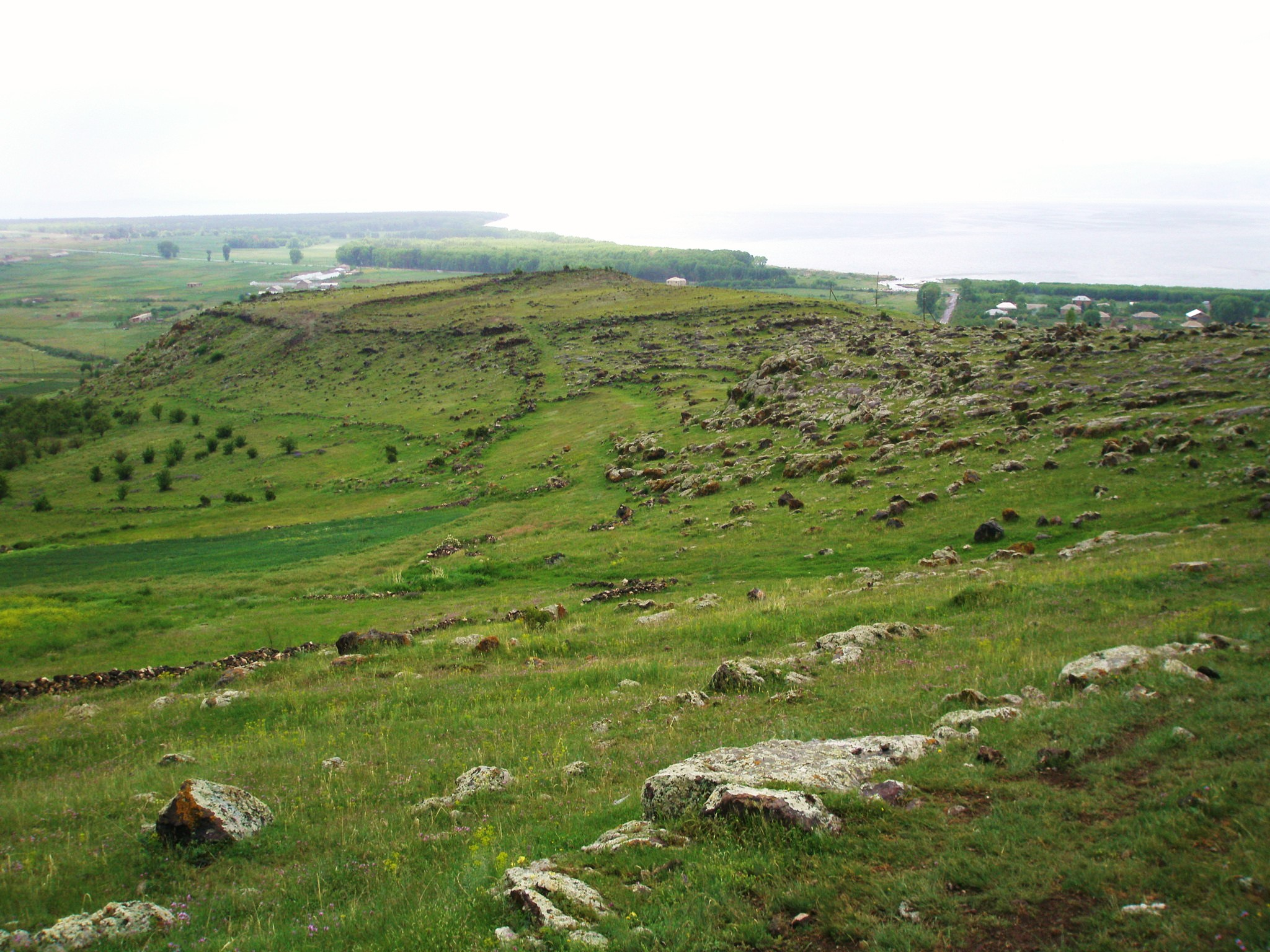

== Pollution ==
The rivers feeding Lake Sevan flow through densely populated settlements which produce agricultural, domestic, and industrial waste. It significantly changes the lake's ecosystem. According to a 2017 study the lake's water contains concentration of metals such as aluminium, nickel, arsenic, cobalt, and lead.

According to Armenian environmental organization EcoLur, the lake is in a critical condition because of the presence of vanadium. Environmental Impact Monitoring Center, an agency of the Armenian Ministry of Nature Protection, reported in 2012 that the average annual concentration of vanadium (64 μg/L) in the samples taken from Lake Sevan exceeded the maximum permissible concentration (MPC) by 6.4 times, while selenium (26 μg/L) exceeded MPC 2.6 times, copper (21 μg/L) 2.1 times, magnesium (60 μg/L) 1.2 times. A 2016 study found that mining and metallurgical industrial activities—namely the Sotk gold mine on the southeastern shore of the lake—caused significant heavy metal, especially vanadium, pollution of the Sotk and Masrik rivers in the Lake Sevan catchment basin. According to the researchers it "may have posed health risks to aquatic life as well as to humans (at least in the case of river water used for drinking purposes)."

== Bibliography ==
- "Շրջակա միջավայրի տեղեկատվական միասնական համակարգ Սևանա լճի համար" (in Armenian). Yerevan: European Environment Agency Shared Environment Information System. 2015. Archived from the original (PDF) on 5 March 2016.
- Avetisyan, Kamsar [in Armenian] (1979). Հայրենագիտական Էտյուդներ [Notes on Armenian Studies] (in Armenian). Yerevan: Sovetakan grogh.
- Babayan, Araik; Hakobyan, Susanna; Jenderedjian, Karen; Muradyan, Siranush; Voskanov, Mikhail (2006). "Lake Sevan: Experience and Lessons Learned Brief" (PDF). ilec.or.jp. International Lake Environment Committee Foundation. pp. 347–362. Archived from the original (PDF) on March 14, 2012.
- Shakarian, Pietro A. (2025). Anastas Mikoyan: An Armenian Reformer in Khrushchev's Kremlin. Bloomington: Indiana University Press. ISBN 978-0253073556.
- Vardanian, Trahel (2009). "The Hydro-chemical changes of Lake Sevan after the artificial lowering of the water level". In Bahadir, Ali Mufit; Duca, Gheorghe (eds.). The Role of Ecological Chemistry in Pollution Research and Sustainable Development. Springer Science & Business Media. pp. 77–84. ISBN 978-90-481-2901-0.
