= Xaldan =

- Municipality
- Location within Azerbaijan
- Coordinates: 40°42′57″N 47°13′38″E
- Country: Azerbaijan
- Rayon: Yevlakh

Population
  - Total: 3,818
- Time zone: UTC+4 (AZT)
  - Summer (DST): UTC+5 (AZT)

Xaldan (also, Khaldan and Kholdan) is a village and municipality in the Yevlakh Rayon of Azerbaijan. It has a population of 3,818. The municipality consists of the villages of Xaldan, Yuxarı Salamabad, and Quşçu.
