= Quşçu, Dashkasan =

Quşçu Խաչակապ • Khachakap
- Municipality
- Location within Azerbaijan
- Coordinates: 40°33′20″N 46°05′31″E
- Country: Azerbaijan
- District: Dashkasan

Population
  - Total: 2,004
- Time zone: UTC+4 (AZT)

Quşçu (Gushchu; Armenian: Խաչակապ, romanized: Khachakap) is a village and municipality in the Dashkasan District of Azerbaijan. The village had an Armenian population before the exodus of Armenians from Azerbaijan after the outbreak of the Nagorno-Karabakh conflict.

== Toponymy ==
The village is also known as Gushchu (Azerbaijani: Quşçu, Armenian: Կուշչի).

== Demographics ==
The village has a population of 2,004.
