= Quşçu, Lachin =

Gushchu
- Azerbaijani: Quşçu
- Location within Azerbaijan Location within East Zangezur Economic Region
- Coordinates: 39°40′19″N 46°21′05″E
- Country: Azerbaijan
- District: Lachin
- Time zone: UTC+4 (AZT)
  - Summer (DST): UTC+5 (AZT)

Quşçu (also, Gushchu) is a village in the Lachin District of Azerbaijan.
