= Quşçular, Jabrayil =

Quşçular
- Location within Azerbaijan
- Coordinates: 39°26′46.6″N 46°54′40.0″E
- Country: Azerbaijan
- District: Jabrayil
- Time zone: UTC+4 (AZT)
  - Summer (DST): UTC+5 (AZT)

Quşçular (Gushchular) is a village in the Jabrayil District of Azerbaijan.
