= Quşçu (settlement) =

Coordinates: 40.5514°N 46.1111°E

Gushchu (Azerbaijani: Quşçu) is a settlement and municipality in the Dashkasan District of Azerbaijan. The municipality consists of the settlement of Quşçu and the town of Quşçu Körpüsü.
