= Quşçular, Khojavend =

Quşçular
- Location within Azerbaijan Location within Karabakh Economic Region
- Coordinates: 39°28′48.3″N 47°04′32.5″E
- Country: Azerbaijan
- District: Khojavend
- Time zone: UTC+4 (AZT)
  - Summer (DST): UTC+5 (AZT)

Quşçular (Gushchular) is a village in the Khojavend District of Azerbaijan.
