= Quşçular, Goranboy =

Gushchular
- Municipality
- Azerbaijani: Quşçular
- Location within Azerbaijan
- Coordinates: 40°26′N 47°08′E
- Country: Azerbaijan
- District: Goranboy

Population
  - Total: 749
- Time zone: UTC+4 (AZT)
  - Summer (DST): UTC+5 (AZT)

Quşçular (also, Gushchular) is a village and municipality in the Goranboy District of Azerbaijan. It has a population of 749.
