= Quşçu, Yevlakh =

Coordinates: 40.715833°N 47.227222°E

Quşçu (also, Gushchu) is a village in the municipality of Khaldan in the Yevlakh District of Azerbaijan. Gushchu has population of over 800 people.
