= Quşçu Körpüsü =

- Location within Azerbaijan
- Coordinates: 40°33′05″N 46°06′40″E
- Country: Azerbaijan
- District: Dashkasan
- Municipality: Gushchu
- Time zone: UTC+4 (AZT)
  - Summer (DST): UTC+5 (AZT)

Quşçu Körpüsü (also, Gushchu Bridge) is a village in the Dashkasan District of Azerbaijan. The village forms part of the municipality of Gushchu.
