= List of Azerbaijani Heroes of the Soviet Union =

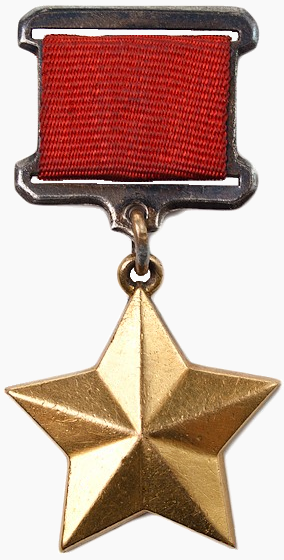
Gold Star medal given to Heroes of the Soviet Union

List of Azerbaijani Heroes of the Soviet Union lists all ethnic Azerbaijani Heroes of the Soviet Union, along with their unit and rank at time of action, and the date of the award. The title Hero of the Soviet Union was the highest distinction of the Soviet Union. 42 Azerbaijanis were awarded the title, including three whose ethnicity is disputed. All Azerbaijani Heroes of the Soviet Union received their award for actions in World War II. Hazi Aslanov was the only Azerbaijani to receive the title twice.

== Recipients ==
This color, along with the * (asterisk), indicates that the title was awarded posthumously.

=== Military Personnel ===
Name	Unit	Rank	Date of award	Notes	References
Mamish Abdullayev Мамиш Абдуллаев Məmiş Abdullayev	399th Rifle Division	Sergeant	24 March 1945 *	Killed in action on 26 January 1945	
Samad Abdullayev Самед Абдуллаев Səməd Abdullayev	318th Mountain Rifle Division	Starshina	17 November 1943 *	Killed in action on 5 November 1943	
Jamil Ahmadov Джамиль Ахмедов; Cəmil Əhmədov	55th Guards Rifle Division	Lieutenant	24 March 1945 *	Died of wounds on 2 September 1944	
Gazanfar Akbarov Газанфар Акперов Qəzənfər Əkbərov	41st Anti-Tank Artillery Brigade, 2nd Tank Army	Senior Sergeant	26 October 1944 *	Killed in action on 3 August 1944	
Mikayil Alakbarov Михаил Алекперов; Mikayıl Ələkbərov	81st Guards Rifle Division	Red Army man	26 October 1943 *	Died of wounds on 13 October 1943	
Mastan Aliyev Мастан Алиев; Məstan Əliyev	143rd Rifle Division	Starshina	31 May 1945 *	Killed in action on 23 April 1945	
Shamsulla Aliyev Шамсулла Алиев; Şəmsulla Əliyev	339th Rifle Division	Captain	16 May 1944 *	Killed in action on 19 November 1943	
Museyib Allahverdiyev Мусеиб Аллахвердиев; Müseyib Allahverdiyev	40th Guards Rifle Division	Captain	24 March 1945	—	
Garay Asadov Герай Асадов; Gəray Əsədov	93rd Guards Rifle Division	Sergeant	24 March 1945 *	Killed in action 12 October 1944	
Hazi Aslanov Ази Асланов; Həzi Aslanov	55th Separate Tank Regiment, 2nd Guards Army	Lieutenant Colonel	22 December 1942	—	
Hazi Aslanov Ази Асланов; Həzi Aslanov	35th Guards Tank Brigade, 3rd Guards Mechanized Corps	Major General	21 June 1991 *	Died of wounds 24 January 1945	
Museyib Baghirov Мусеиб Багиров; Müseyib Bağırov	69th Guards Rifle Division	Lieutenant	22 February 1944	—	
Ismayil Bayramov Исмаил Байрамов; İsmayıl Bayramov	181st Rifle Division	Starshina	10 April 1945 *	Killed in action on 10 February 1945	
Ziya Bunyadov Зия Буниятов; Ziya Bünyadov	123rd Separate Rifle Company, 5th Shock Army	Captain	27 February 1945	—	
Maharram Dadashev Магеррам Дадашев; Məhərrəm Dadaşov	233rd Tank Brigade, 5th Mechanized Corps	Senior Sergeant	24 March 1945 *	Died of wounds 17 September 1944	
Abbas Guliyev Аббас Кулиев; Abbas Quliyev	5th Artillery Division	Senior Lieutenant	21 February 1945	—	
Adil Guliyev Адиль Кулиев; Adil Quliyev	65th Guards Fighter Aviation Regiment, 4th Guards Fighter Aviation Division	Captain	23 February 1945	—	
Mehdi Guliyev Мехти Кулиев; Mehdi Guliyev	2nd Guards Rifle Division	Junior Sergeant	17 November 1943	—	
Habibullah Huseynov Габибулла Гусейнов; Həbibulla Hüseynov	67th Anti-Aircraft Artillery Division	Colonel	29 June 1945 *	Killed in action on 16 April 1945	
Mirza Jabiyev Мирза Джабиев; Mirzə Cəbiyev	235th Rifle Division	Lieutenant	19 April 1945	Ethnicity in doubt, may have been either Talysh or Azerbaijani.	
Aghashirin Jafarov Агаширин Джафаров; Ağaşirin Cəfərov	416th Rifle Division	Junior Sergeant	1 November 1943	—	
Salahaddin Kazimov Салахаддин Кязимов; Salahəddin Kazımov	8th Rifle Division	Senior Lieutenant	16 October 1943	Ethnicity unclear. Either Tsakhur or Azerbaijani.	
Malik Maharramov Мелик Магерамов; Məlik Məhərrəmov	77th Guards Rifle Division	Lieutenant	15 January 1944	—	
Mammad Maharramov Мамед Магеррамов; Məmməd Məhərrəmov	254th Rifle Division	Senior Sergeant	22 February 1944	—	
Ami Mammadov Ами Мамедов; Əmi Məmmədov	384th Separate Naval Infantry Battalion, Odessa Naval Base, Black Sea Fleet	Matros	20 April 1945 *	Killed in action on 26 March 1944	
Gafur Mammadov Кафур Мамедов; Qafur Məmmədov	323rd Separate Naval Infantry Battalion, Black Sea Fleet	Matros	31 March 1943 *	Killed in action on 19 October 1942	
Israfil Mammadov Исрафил Мамедов; İsrafil Məmmədov	180th Rifle Division	Senior Sergeant	11 December 1941	—	
Khalil Mammadov Халил Мамедов; Xəlil Məmmədov	3rd Tank Brigade, 23rd Tank Corps	Captain	24 March 1945	—	
Mammad Mammadov Мамед Мамедов; Məmməd Məmmədov	373rd Rifle Division	Senior Sergeant	10 April 1945 *	Killed in action on 24 January 1945	
Bahatdin Mirzayev Бахятдин Мирзоев; Bahəddin Mirzəyev	416th Rifle Division	Senior Lieutenant	24 March 1945	—	
Mardan Musayev Мардан Мусаев; Mərdan Musayev	5th Guards Mechanized Brigade, 2nd Guards Mechanized Corps	Senior Sergeant	3 June 1944	—	
Bakir Mustafayev Бекир Мустафаев; Bəkir Mustafayev	55th Guards Rifle Division	Red Army man	16 May 1944	—	
Khydyr Mustafayev Хыдыр Мустафаев; Xıdır Mustafayev	91st Separate Tank Brigade, 3rd Guards Tank Army	Major	10 January 1944	—	
Alif Piriyev Алиф Пириев; Əlif Piriyev	32nd Guards Rifle Division	Sergeant	24 March 1945	—	
Najafgulu Rafiyev Наджафгулу Рафиев; Nəcəfqulu Rəfiyev	37th Mechanized Brigade, 1st Mechanized Corps	Junior Lieutenant	26 September 1944	—	
Yusif Sadykhov Юсиф Садыхов; Yusif Sadıqov	19th Guards Mechanized Brigade, 8th Guards Mechanized Corps	Starshina	31 May 1945	—	
Fariz Safarov Фарис Сафаров; Fariz Səfərov	25th Guards Rifle Division	Senior Sergeant	19 March 1944	—	
Shirin Shukurov Ширин Шукюров; Şirin Şükürov	339th Rifle Division	Red Army man	27 February 1945	—	
Idris Suleymanov Идрис Сулейманов; İdris Süleymanov	43rd Separate Rifle Brigade, North Caucasus Front	Junior Lieutenant	13 December 1942	—	
Mirza Valiyev Мирза Велиев; Mirzə Vəliyev	109th Guards Rifle Division	Senior Sergeant	24 March 1945 *	Killed in action on 6 November 1944. Nationality unclear. Valiyev listed as Lezghin on documents. Birth certificate states Azerbaijani nationality.	
Aslan Vazirov Аслан Везиров; Aslan Vəzirov	1st Guards Assault-Engineer Sapper Brigade	Colonel	29 June 1945	—	
Avaz Verdiyev Аваз Вердиев; Əvəz Verdiyev	55th Guards Tank Brigade, 7th Guards Tank Corps	Senior Sergeant	23 September 1944	Died of wounds on 1 May 1945	

=== Partisans ===
Name	Date of award	Notes	References
Mehdi Huseynzade Мехти Гусейнзаде; Mehdi Hüseynzadə	11 April 1957 *	Killed in action 16 November 1944	"Mehdi Huseynzade". warheroes.ru (in Russian).
84 other citizens of Azerbaijan	1944	They helped the USSR army fight of the Nazis during the battle of the Caucasus in 1944	https://iacis.ru

== See also ==
Azerbaijan in World War II
