= Spitakşen =

Spitakşen or Spitakshen may refer to:

- Ağkənd (disambiguation), several places in Azerbaijan
- Spitakashen, Hadrut, also known as Spitakşen, a village in the Khojavend raion of Azerbaijan
- Spitakashen, Martuni, Republic of Artsakh
- Spitakşen, Shamkir, Azerbaijan
