= Ağkənd =

Ağkənd (Azerbaijani for "white village") may refer to:

- Ağkənd, Khojavend, Azerbaijan
- Ağkənd, Tartar, Azerbaijan
- Ağkənd, Zangilan, Azerbaijan
