= Verdiyev =

Verdiyev is a surname. Notable people with the surname include:

- Ali Verdiyev (1936–2020), Azerbaijani artist
- Avaz Verdiyev (1916–1945), Azerbaijani sergeant
