= Petrosashen =

Petrosashen Պետրոսաշեն Petrosaşen
- Location within Azerbaijan Location within Karabakh Economic Region
- Coordinates: 39°32′48″N 46°44′41″E
- Country: Azerbaijan
- District: Khojavend
- Time zone: UTC+4 (AZT)

Petrosashen (Armenian: Պետրոսաշեն, Azerbaijani: Petrosaşen) is a village in the Khojavend District of Azerbaijan, in the disputed region of Nagorno-Karabakh.

== History ==
The village suffered during the Armenian–Azerbaijani War in 1918-1920. According to Armenian historian Richard G. Hovannisian, at the end of November 1918, local Azerbaijanis destroyed Petrosashen and two other Armenian villages, Spitakashen and Harar, the three remaining Armenian villages between Nagorno-Karabakh and Zangezur, thus dividing the two mountainous regions.

During the Soviet period, the village was part of the Hadrut District of the Nagorno-Karabakh Autonomous Oblast. After the First Nagorno-Karabakh War, the village was administrated as part of the Hadrut Province of the breakaway Republic of Artsakh. The village came under the control of Azerbaijan during the 2020 Nagorno-Karabakh war.

== Demographics ==
The village had an ethnic Armenian-majority in 1989. However, it was uninhabited in 2015.
