= Yuxarı Fərəcan =

- Location within Azerbaijan Location within East Zangezur Economic Region
- Coordinates: 39°32′21″N 46°40′47″E
- Country: Azerbaijan
- District: Lachin
- Time zone: UTC+4 (AZT)
  - Summer (DST): UTC+5 (AZT)

Yuxarı Fərəcan (Yukhary Farajan) is a village in the Lachin District of Azerbaijan.

== See also ==
- Aşağı Fərəcan, "Lower Fərəcan"
