= Zoravor Surp Astvatsatsin Church (Jabrayil) =

Armenian Apostolic church in Jebrayil, Azerbaijan

- Interactive map of Zoravor Surp Astvatsatsin Church

Zoravor Surp Astvatsatsin Church (Մեխակավանի Զորավոր Սուրբ Աստվածածին եկեղեցի) or Holy Mother of God Church, was an Armenian Apostolic church built in 2017 in the settlement of Jebrayil in the Hadrut Province, Azerbaijan. The church was completely destroyed by Azerbaijan in 2021. The church was located on a hill adjacent to the Jebrayil military unit.

== History ==
The church was built through the efforts of the regimental chaplain, Deacon Sargis Abyan, and funded by benefactor Grigor Movsisyan. It was consecrated on October 1, 2017, by Bishop Vrtanes Abrahamyan, the spiritual leader of the RA Armed Forces.

During the 2020 Nagorno-Karabakh war, Azerbaijan captured Jebrayil. Subsequently, videos were released showing Azerbaijani soldiers desecrating the Zoravor Surp Astvatsatsin Church. In these videos, the church remained standing, but Azerbaijani soldiers were filmed breaking the cross from the roof.

In March 2021, a report published by the BBC revealed that the church had been razed to the ground. In the footage, Azerbaijani representatives claimed that Armenians had destroyed it before leaving; however, existing video evidence proves otherwise. BBC journalist Jonah Fisher documented that the church could not have been destroyed during the war, as videos clearly show the building intact when Azerbaijani forces first arrived at the site.
