= Arevik National Park =

National park in Armenia

- IUCN category II (national park)
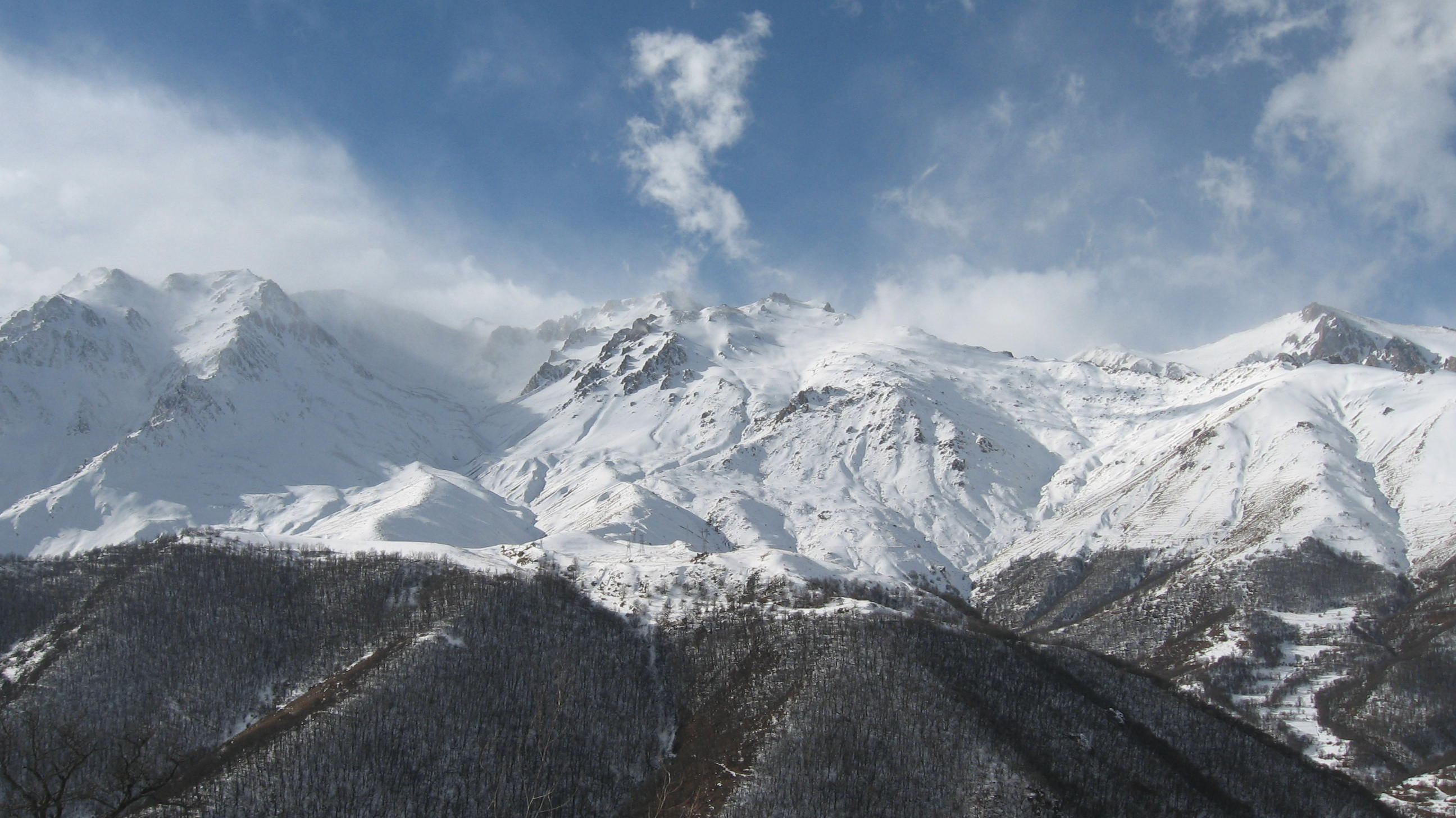
- Arevik National Park and Meghri mountains in winter

- Location within Armenia
- Location: Syunik Province, Armenia
- Coordinates: 38°59′12″N 46°17′01″E
- Area: 344 km^{2} (133 sq mi)
- Established: 2009
- Governing body: Ministry of Nature Protection, Armenia

Arevik National Park (Armenian: Արևիկ ազգային պարկ, romanized: Arevik azgayin park) is one of the four protected national parks of Armenia. Occupying an area of 344 km^{2}, it is located in the southern Syunik Province of Armenia.

== Fauna ==
=== Invertebrates ===
Among over 150 species of butterflies recorded in the national park, there are several species included in Red Book of Armenia. Those are Parnassius mnemosyne, Parnassius apollo, Papilio alexanor, Pontia chloridice, Colias aurorina, Polyommatus zarathustra, and others. Ranges of some endangered species, like Polyommatus damonides, are not covered by the protected area.

=== Birds ===
Among over 180 species of birds recorded in the national park, there are number of species included in Red Book of Armenia: lammergeyer, griffon vulture, Egyptian vulture, golden eagle, peregrine falcon, Levant sparrowhawk, woodchat shrike, and others.

== Flora ==
A part of the population of the endangered and rare Iris grossheimii is located within Park, which allows continual monitoring and protection.

== Conservation ==
There are seven Prime Butterfly Areas (PBA) designated for the region, most of those are at least partly covered by the area of the national park, except Meghri PBA, which has no national conservation status.

== See also ==
- List of protected areas of Armenia
