= Quşçular, Lachin =

Gushchular
- Azerbaijani: Quşçular
- Location within Azerbaijan Location within East Zangezur Economic Region
- Coordinates: 39°30′41″N 46°37′55″E
- Country: Azerbaijan
- District: Lachin

Population (2015)
  - Total: 36
- Time zone: UTC+4 (AZT)

Quşçular (also, Gushchular) is a former village in the Lachin District of Azerbaijan.

== History ==
This village existed in the locality list of Ashaghi-Farajan Selsoviet (rural council) of Lachin District in 1963, but did not exist in the same list of 1968. Currently this locality also does not exist in the locality list of Lachin District. It may mean that this village was abolished between 1963 and 1968.

This locality was located in the Armenian-occupied territories surrounding Nagorno-Karabakh, coming under the control of ethnic Armenian forces during the First Nagorno-Karabakh War in the early 1990s, subsequently becoming part of the breakaway Republic of Artsakh as part of its Kashatagh Province, where it was known as Aghavnatun (Armenian: Աղավնատուն). The locality was returned to Azerbaijan as part of the 2020 Nagorno-Karabakh ceasefire agreement.

== Historical heritage sites ==
Historical heritage sites in and around the village include three 14th/15th-century khachkars, a 15th/16th-century khachkar, and the 15th/16th-century St. Stephen's Church (Armenian: Սուրբ Ստեփանոս եկեղեցի, romanized: Surb Stepanos Yekeghetsi) in the neighboring village of Harar.
