= Əsrik Cırdaxan =

- Municipality
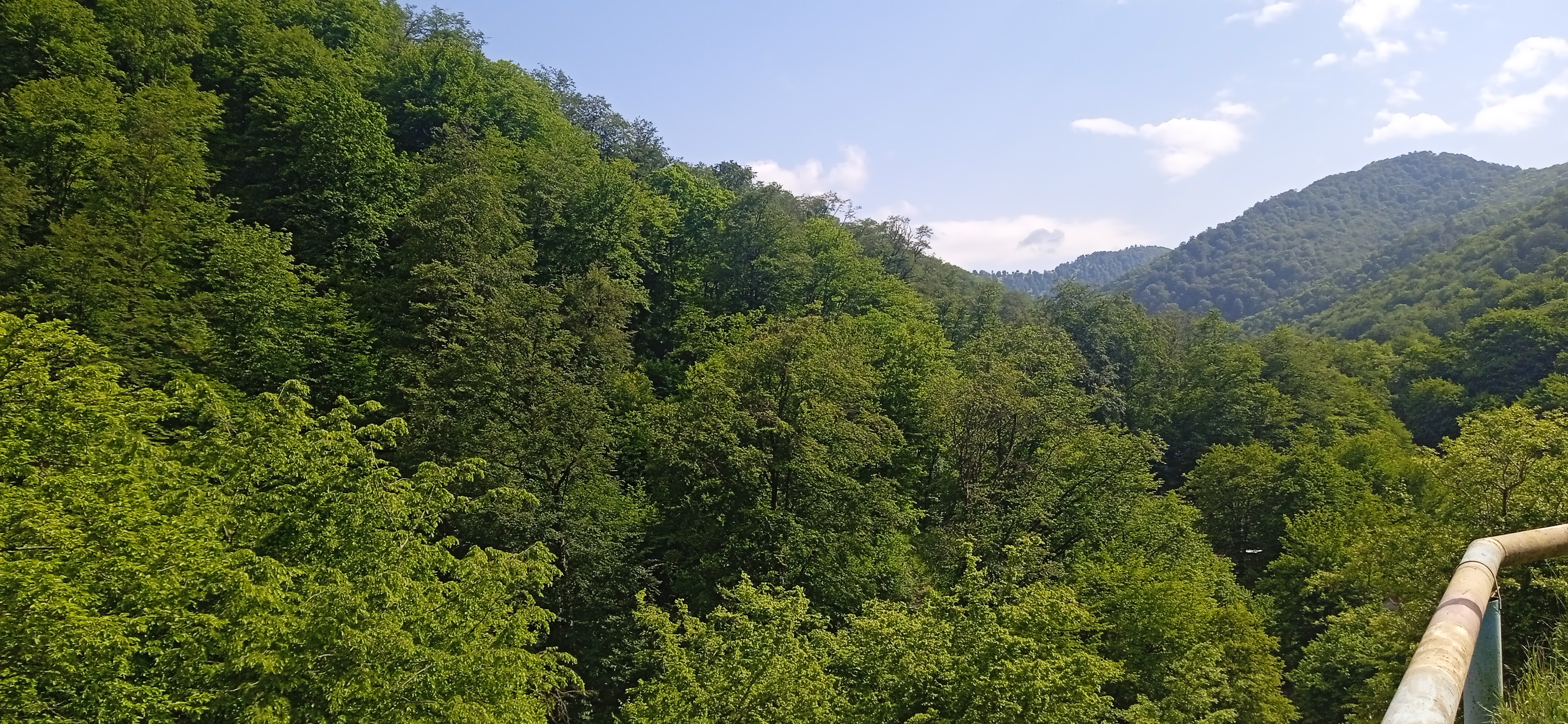

- Location within Azerbaijan
- Coordinates: 40°51′59″N 45°37′44″E
- Country: Azerbaijan
- Rayon: Tovuz

Population
  - Total: 2,154
- Time zone: UTC+4 (AZT)
  - Summer (DST): UTC+5 (AZT)

Əsrik Cırdaxan (also, Əsrik Çırdaxan, Asrikdzhirdakhan, Asrik-Dzhyrdakan, and Asrikdzhyrdakhan) is a village and municipality in the Tovuz Rayon of Azerbaijan. It has a population of 2,154.

== Notable natives ==
- Mastan Aliyev — Hero of the Soviet Union.
