= Bülbülə =

- Municipality
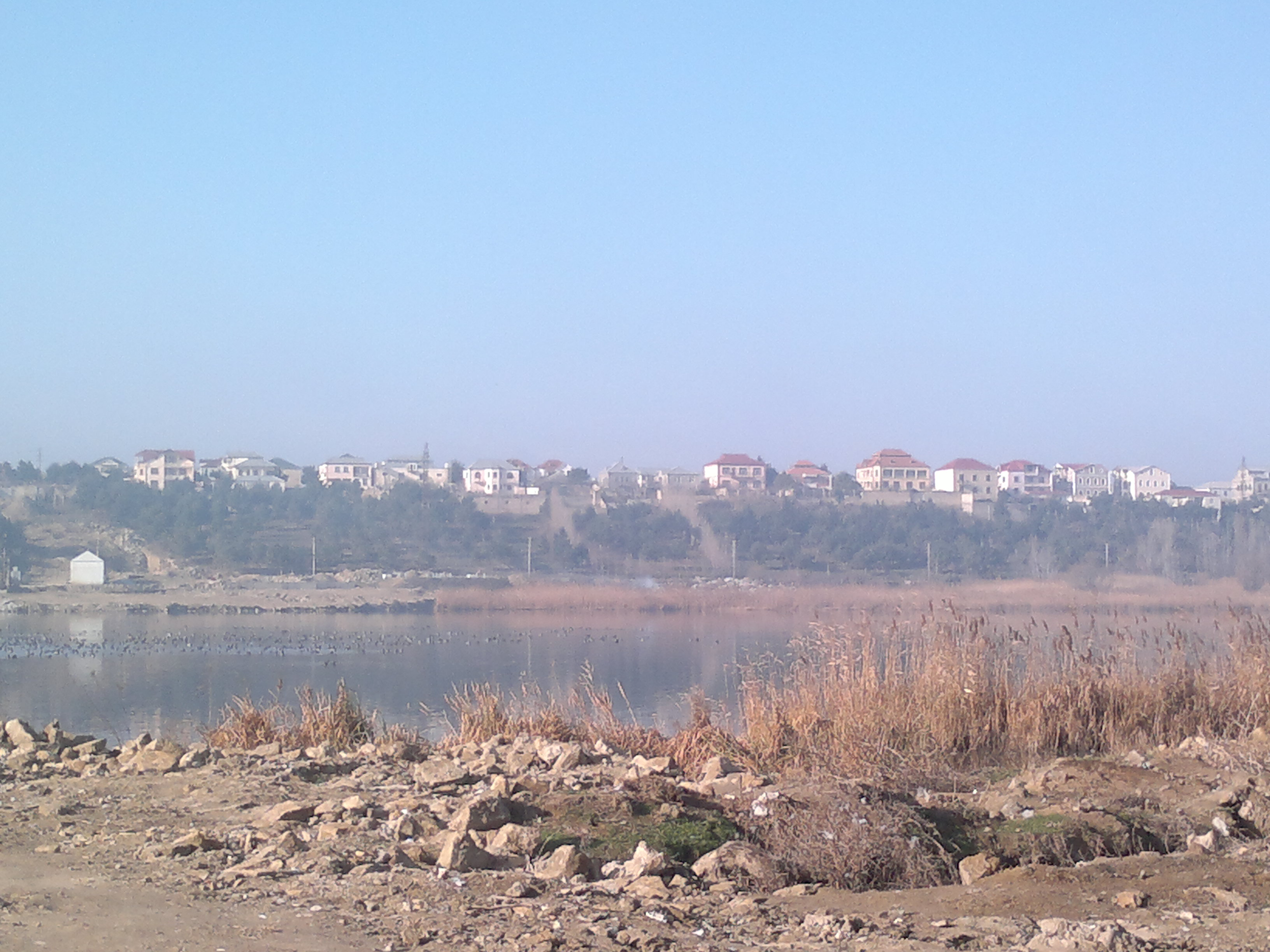

- Location within Azerbaijan
- Coordinates: 40°26′03″N 49°58′33″E
- Country: Azerbaijan
- City: Baku
- Raion: Suraxanı

Population (2008)
  - Total: 17,105
- Time zone: UTC+4 (AZT)
  - Summer (DST): UTC+5 (AZT)

Bülbülə (also, Byul’byuli, Byul’byulya, and Byulbyuti) is a municipality in Baku, Azerbaijan. It has a population of 17,105.

== Notable natives ==
- Avaz Verdiyev — Hero of the Soviet Union.
