= Zümürxan =

- Municipality
- Location within Azerbaijan Location within Karabakh Economic Region
- Coordinates: 40°22′39″N 47°04′35″E
- Country: Azerbaijan
- Rayon: Barda

Population
  - Total: 1,307
- Time zone: UTC+4 (AZT)
  - Summer (DST): UTC+5 (AZT)

Zümürxan (until 2008, Zümürxaç and Zyumyurkhach) is a village and municipality in the Barda Rayon of Azerbaijan. It has a population of 1,307.

== Notable natives ==
- Aslan Vazirov — Hero of the Soviet Union.
