= Polyommatus damonides =

Scientific classification
- Domain: Eukaryota
- Kingdom: Animalia
- Phylum: Arthropoda
- Class: Insecta
- Order: Lepidoptera
- Family: Lycaenidae
- Genus: Polyommatus
- Species: P. damonides

Binomial name
- Polyommatus damonides (Staudinger, 1899)

Synonyms
- Lycaena damone var. damonides Staudinger, 1899

Species of butterfly

Polyommatus damonides, the Damonides blue, is a butterfly of the family Lycaenidae. It was described by Otto Staudinger in 1899. It is endemic to the southern part of the Zangezur Mountains, where it is known in two populations. One is the vicinity of the town of Meghri in Armenia (Syunik marz) and another lives near the town of Ordubad in Nakhichevan.

== Distribution and biological peculiarities ==
It is endemic of southern part of the Zangezur Mountains where is known in two populations. One population inhabits the southern part of Syunik province in Armenia, and another is in the southern region of Nakhichevan. The species inhabits a semi-desert zone. The host plant is not confirmed yet. In Armenia the species inhabits a narrow belt from 900 to 1200 metres above sea level, however, the boundaries of its range are not clarified. Flight period lasts from late May to late June.

== Population dynamics ==
For a long period, the Damonides blue was considered extinct from Armenia, since the last records dated to 1973 and the majority of its habitat was destroyed by open-pit mining. However, in 2010 it was rediscovered at a patch of habitat left in the foothills of the southwestern slopes of the Zangezur Mountains. The data is insufficient for calculation of trends, but it can be stated that its number is fairly low even at the typical habitat. Expansion of the open pit remains the major threat that can ultimately destroy the species' habitat and lead to its local extinction. Also, grazing of goats and sheep has some influence on the habitat by possibly removing the species host plant.

== Conservation measures ==
The species has not yet been evaluated for the IUCN Red List. It is included in the Red Book of Animals of Armenia as critically endangered CR B1ab (i, ii, iii) + B2b (i, ii, iii). It is not listed in CITES or the Bern Convention.

The two most important conservation steps are:

- obtaining the distribution range of the species and including its distribution area into the boundaries of the Zangezur Biosphere Complex
- evaluating the species for the IUCN Red List.

These measures will allow further development of a management plan for the habitat of the species.
