= Farda Amin =

Azerbaijani actor

- Fərda Əmin
- Born: Farda; 1979 (age 46–47); Siyazan District Azerbaijan
- Education: Azerbaijan State University of Economics
- Style: Comedy

Farda Amin (Azerbaijani: Fərda Əmin) also known as Fərda Əmin, is an Azerbaijani actor, comedian and screenwriter.

== Early life ==
Farda Amin is originally from Gozagaji village of Siyazan region . He was born on 12 August 1979, in Jabrayil. During his studies at the University of Economics, he performed in the "Şən və hazırcavablar klubu". He was a participant in the program "Tək Səbir" on Space TV, authored and hosted by Hasan Aliyev. The director of this program was Farda. The script was written together with Elmaddin Jafarov. Amin created the program "Sərbəst FM", and a few years later appeared on the program "Tam Sərbəst Solo". A few years later, in 2007, together with Mushfig Shahverdiyev, the program "Sərbəst FM" was released. That same year, Mushfig and Farda asked "Niyə?" is filmed. Since 2014, he has been the host of the "Top kimi Şou" program. "Interpapa", "Ögey ata", "Xoxan", "Naxox", "Niyə?" starred in films such as "Ögey ata," "Interpapa," "Niyə?" wrote the screenplays for his films.
The actor married a woman named Gunel in 2010. He is the father of two sons.

== Career ==
He began his career on stage with the stand-up comedy acts on the ANS TV station and then resumed as an actor in Azerbaijani Film industry. His most notable works are:

1. Trace-(Azerbaijani: İz)-2002
2. Wedding-(Azerbaijani: Toy)-2005- Dashdamir
3. İnterpapa-2006-Maqsad
4. Why? (Azerbaijani: Niyə?)-Asiman
5. Habit-(Azerbaijani: Vərdiş)-2006
6. Stepfather-(Azerbaijani: Ögey ata)-2013-Karamat
7. Xoxan-2014 – Raftar
8. Night guest-(Azerbaijani:Gecə qonağı)-2015-Jamal
9. The Boys House-(Azerbaijani: Oğlan Evi: Azərbaycansayağı qarət)-2015-Ramin
