= Spitakashen, Hadrut =

Spitakashen Սպիտակաշեն Spitakşen
- Location within Azerbaijan Location within Karabakh Economic Region
- Coordinates: 39°32′20″N 46°42′42″E
- Country: Azerbaijan
- District: Khojavend

Population (2015)
  - Total: 11
- Time zone: UTC+4 (AZT)

Spitakashen (Armenian: Սպիտակաշեն; Azerbaijani: Spitakşen, lit. 'white village') is a village in the Khojavend District of Azerbaijan. The village had an ethnic Armenian-majority population prior to the 2020 Nagorno-Karabakh war, and also had an Armenian majority in 1989.

== History ==
The village suffered during the Armenian–Azerbaijani War in 1918-1920. According to Armenian historian Richard G. Hovannisian, at the end of November 1918, local Azerbaijanis destroyed Spitakashen and two other Armenian villages, Petrosashen and Harar, the three remaining Armenian villages between Nagorno-Karabakh and Zangezur, thus dividing the two mountainous regions.

During the Soviet period, the village was part of the Hadrut District of the Nagorno-Karabakh Autonomous Oblast. After the First Nagorno-Karabakh War, the village was administrated as part of the Hadrut Province of the breakaway Republic of Artsakh. The village came under the control of Azerbaijan during the 2020 Nagorno-Karabakh war.

== Historical heritage sites ==
Historical heritage sites in and around the village include the church of Tezkharab (Armenian: Թեզխարաբ).

== Demographics ==
The village had 22 inhabitants in 2005, and 11 inhabitants in 2015.
