= Ami Mammadov =

Soviet Navy seaman

Ami Agha oglu Mammadov
- Əmi Ağa oğlu Məmmədov
- Born: 1922; Baku, Azerbaijan SSR
- Died: 26 March 1944 (aged 21–22); Mykolaiv, Ukrainian SSR, Soviet Union
- Military career
- Allegiance: Soviet Union
- Branch: Soviet Navy
- Service years: 1942–1944
- Rank: Matros
- Unit: 384th Separate Naval Infantry Battalion
- Conflicts: World War II; Odessa Offensive
- Awards: Hero of the Soviet Union

Ami Agha oglu Mammadov (Azerbaijani: Əmi Ağa oğlu Məmmədov; 1922–26 March 1944) was a Soviet Navy Matros and a posthumous Hero of the Soviet Union. Mammadov was posthumously awarded the title on 20 April 1945 for his actions during the capture of Mykolaiv. Mammadov reportedly destroyed several German vehicles with his anti-tank rifle and was killed when the house he was defending collapsed under German fire. He was an anti-tank rifleman in the 384th Separate Naval Infantry Battalion of the Black Sea Fleet.

== Early life ==
Mammadov was born in 1922 in Baku in the family of a worker. He graduated from seventh grade. After completing his education Mammadov worked as a fitter and then a driver in the Azizbekovneft oilfield.

== World War II ==
In 1942, Mammadov was drafted into the Soviet Navy. He became a Matros in the Black Sea Fleet Naval Infantry. In May 1943 he became an Anti-tank rifleman in the 384th Separate Naval Infantry Battalion. In the fall of 1943, he fought in the amphibious operations to capture Taganrog, Mariupol, and Osipenko.

In late March, the 28th Army began fighting to capture Mykolaiv. To help their advance, a detachment from 384th Battalion of 55 sailors under the command of Senior lieutenant Konstantin Olshansky was landed in Mykolaiv. Mammadov took up positions in a wooden house along with nine other soldiers under the command of Starshina 1st class Yury Lisitsyn. At dawn, the detachment was attacked by German troops. The attack was repulsed by soldiers positioned in a cement shed. The German troops renewed the attack, attempting to bypass the cement shed, and were stopped by fire from the wooden house. The German forces brought up mortars, tanks, and artillery, shelling the positions of the landing force. During the fourth attack, the German troops concentrated on the wooden house, killing one of its defenders. Before the fifth attack, German troops used Nebelwerfers and thermite shells to set fire to the wooden house. Three of the defenders were killed by shrapnel and machine gun fire. Most of the defenders of the house were wounded. Mammadov reportedly continued to fire his anti-tank gun, disabling a tank, two armored cars, and six firing points. Mammadov reportedly killed dozens of German soldiers. A sixth attack was repulsed, and during a seventh attack the burning house collapsed under tank fire. Mammadov and five others died in the building.

Mammadov was buried in a mass grave in the park of 68 Marines in Mykolaiv. On 20 April 1945 Mammadov was posthumously awarded the title Hero of the Soviet Union and the Order of Lenin, along with the other participants in the operation.

== Legacy ==
A bust of Mammadov was built in Baku near School No. 101.
