= Jabrayil =

Jabrayil Cəbrayıl
- City and municipality
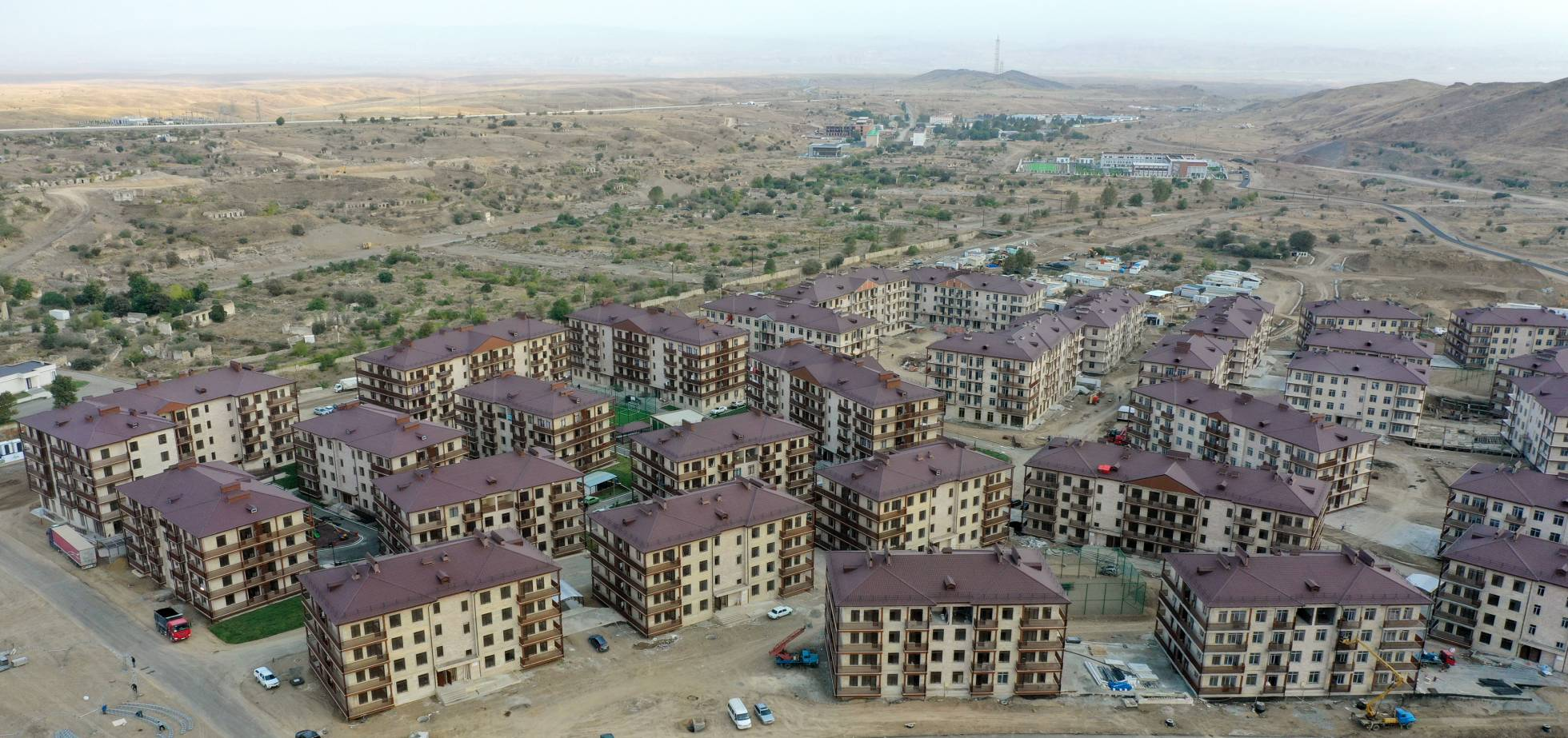
- New residential buildings constructed in 2021-2024

- Location within Azerbaijan
- Coordinates: 39°24′00″N 47°01′34″E
- Country: Azerbaijan
- District: Jabrayil
- Established: 1980
- Elevation: 569 m (1,867 ft)

Population (2025)
  - Total: 2,293; Pre-war population was 6,070
- Time zone: UTC+4 (AZT)

Jabrayil (Azerbaijani: Cəbrayıl, IPA: [dʒæbɾɑˈjɯl]) is a city in Azerbaijan, nominally the administrative capital of Azerbaijan's Jabrayil District.

A town with a Azerbaijani majority and Armenian plurality at various times during the Russian imperial era, and Azerbaijani majority since the Soviet times, it was abandoned since its destruction by local Armenian forces during the First Nagorno-Karabakh War. On 4 October 2020, Azerbaijani forces retook the city during the Second Nagorno-Karabakh War. Reconstruction of the city started in 2021, and the first residents returned in 2024.

== History ==
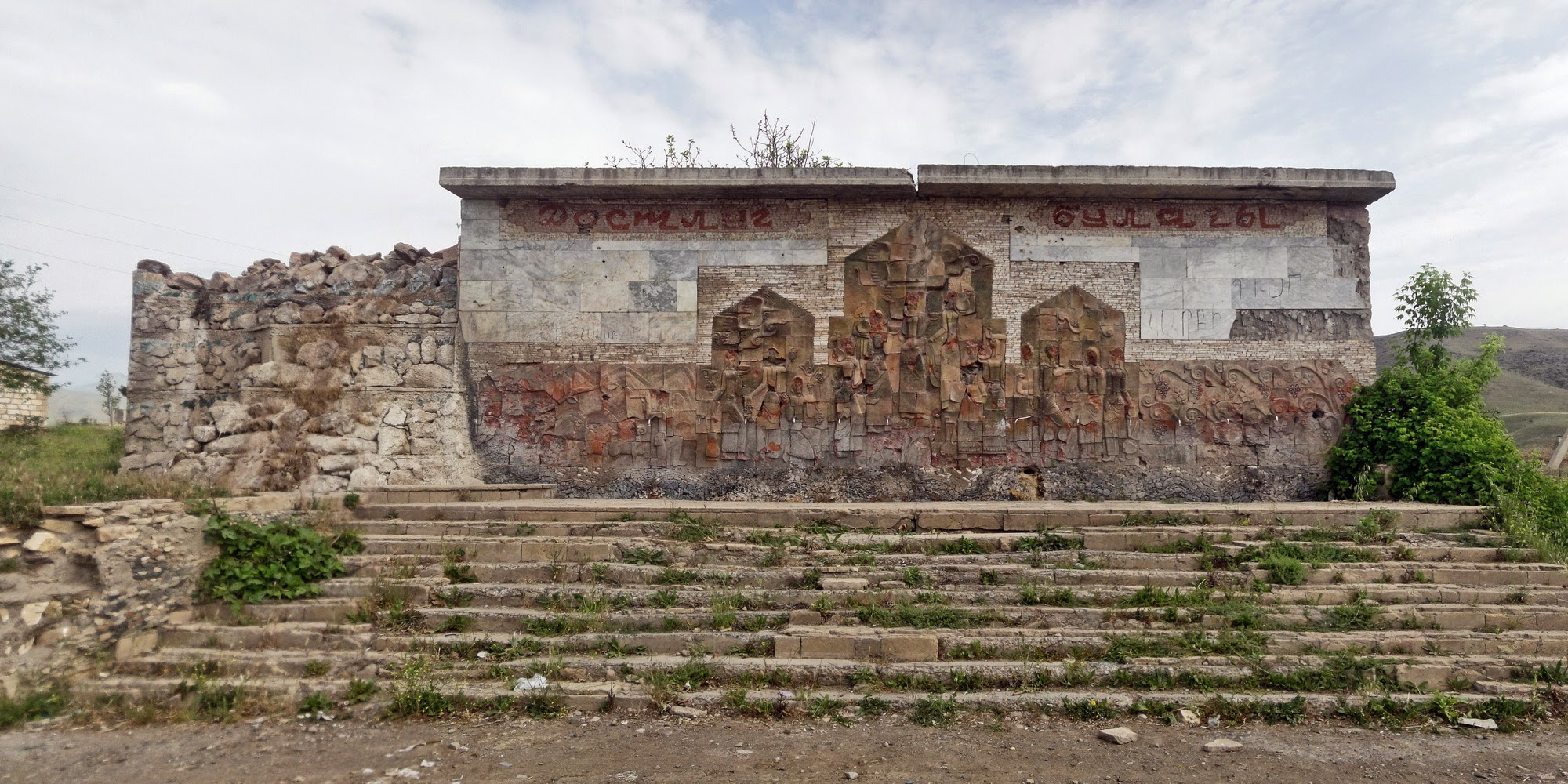
Memorial spring of Jabrayil

According to Armenian historian Samvel Karapetyan, archaeological evidence found in the village suggests that it was once populated by Armenians who probably abandoned it in the beginning of the 17th century. Armenian folk tales about the old village spring of Jabrayil, published in the 1870s by the Mshak newspaper, state that it was built by Armenians in the days of Lusavorich as evidenced by the crosses engraved on the pavement of the well. The area of Jabrayil was part of the Karabakh Khanate until 1813, when it was annexed into the Russian empire following the Treaty of Gulistan. The 19th-century Armenian author Raffi mentions a historical Jabrayil bridge (Jabrayili Kamurj) in the vicinity of the village.

=== Russian Empire ===
In tsarist times, Jabrayil was a village first in the Shusha uezd and then in the Dzhebrail Uezd (created in 1868) as its administrative centre, within the Elisabethpol Governorate of the Russian Empire. According to the annual reference book Caucasian Calendar, the population of Jabrayil in 1855 consisted of Shia Tatars (later known as Azerbaijanis). However, in the 1897 Russian census, the population of the village of Jabrayil was 520, with an Armenian plurality: 228 Armenians; 186 Turko-Tatars; 76 Russians. During the Russian Empire, Jabrayil was the location of a customs office for the Russian-Persian border, as well as, a royal school staffed by the Armenians, including its principal Alexander Ter-Abrahamian (since 1879).

=== Soviet Union ===
According to the 1926 Soviet census, the population of Jabrayil District was 10,653. No ethnic breakdown is listed for the village itself. Of those in the district, 97.2% were Turks (i.e. Azerbaijanis), 105 (1%) were Russians, 57 (0.5%) were Armenians and 24 (0.2%) were Persians. The 1979 Soviet census registered 4,825 inhabitants, almost all (99,5 %) ethnic Azerbaijanis. As the administrative center of the eponymous district, Jabrayil developed considerably during the Soviet era and by the beginning of the 1950s, there were two seven-year schools, a secondary school, a cultural center, summer and winter cinemas, two libraries, and a club. The town's main economic products were butter, cheeses, and carpets.

=== Armenian control ===
On 23 August 1993, during the First Nagorno-Karabakh War, the city was occupied by the forces of Armenia and the breakaway Republic of Artsakh, causing the displacement of its population. Like most other cities in the seven districts of Azerbaijan captured by Armenian forces, Jabrayil was looted and destroyed and remained a ghost town following its capture. Within Artsakh, it was renamed Jrakan (Ջրական), and also called Mekhakavan (Մեխակավան) and was administered as a part of the Hadrut Province.

=== Restoration of Azerbaijani control ===
After 27 years, on 9 October 2020, Azerbaijan regained control of the city during the 2020 Nagorno-Karabakh war.

On 4 October 2020, Azerbaijani President Ilham Aliyev announced that the Azerbaijani Armed Forces had taken control of the city following a day-long battle; however, Shushan Stepanyan, the Press Secretary of the Minister of Defence of Armenia denied this. On 5 October, the Artsakhian President, Arayik Harutyunyan, claimed that he had visited the city. However, on 9 October 2020, footage released by Azerbaijan Ministry of Defence showed Azerbaijani soldiers raising the flag of Azerbaijan in the centre of the ruined city. Reporters from Euronews visited the city on 17 October, confirming that it had come under Azerbaijani control.

In November 2020 Azerbaijani media visited the recently recaptured city and reported that except for a newly built military base, no building was left intact since the capture of the city in 1993. Several ambassadors who visited the ruined city in February 2021 expressed their shock at the state of the city and added that a number of graves had been defaced or dug up. A BBC report noted that the homes and graves of Azerbaijanis had been completely destroyed during the Armenian occupation.

In 2017, the Zoravor Surb Astvatsatsin (St. Mary's) Armenian church was opened at the Armenian military base in Jabrayil. Construction of the church drew condemnation from Azerbaijan's Ministry of Foreign Affairs. In March 2021, BBC journalist Jonah Fisher visited the site of the church using geolocation and observed no trace of it remained. When he asked the police escort what happened to the church, the latter initially said that the church was "destroyed during the war" but then when confronted with the fact that videos clearly showed the church was still intact when the area had come under Azerbaijani control, he said that "they [Armenians] destroyed it themselves". When Fisher showed the images to Head of Foreign Policy Affairs Department of the Presidential Administration Hikmet Hajiyev saying "the church has been destroyed", Hajiyev replied "because it's a proper geolocation I don't know, I need to check", then adding that "in Jabrayil never ever Armenian lived [sic]" and that "building any religious site of changing any religious character of the region is a violation of international humanitarian law," and then changed the subject to the destruction of Azerbaijani cities by Armenians.

In early February 2021, foreign ambassadors accredited to Azerbaijan, military attachés and heads of international organizations visited Jabrayil. They, in particular, visited the destroyed House of Culture and the cemetery. In September 2021, the British company Chapman Taylor won a tender to prepare a draft master plan for Jabrayil. In October of the same year, on the anniversary of Azerbaijan regaining control of the city, President Ilham Aliyev laid the foundation stone for the central district hospital, school, and the first apartment block. First residents returned to the city in September 2024. Construction of the second and third residential quarters, as well as a mosque, started in October 2025.

== Notable people ==
- Jamil Ahmadov – Hero of the Soviet Union.
- Teymur Guliyev – Chairman of the Council of People's Commissars (1937–1953) and the Council of Ministers of Azerbaijan SSR (1953–1954).
- Farda Amin – Azerbaijani actor, comedian and a screenwriter.
- Suren Shadunts – First Secretary of the Communist Party of Tajikistan between 1934 and 1937 and de facto leader of the Tajik SSR.

== Gallery ==
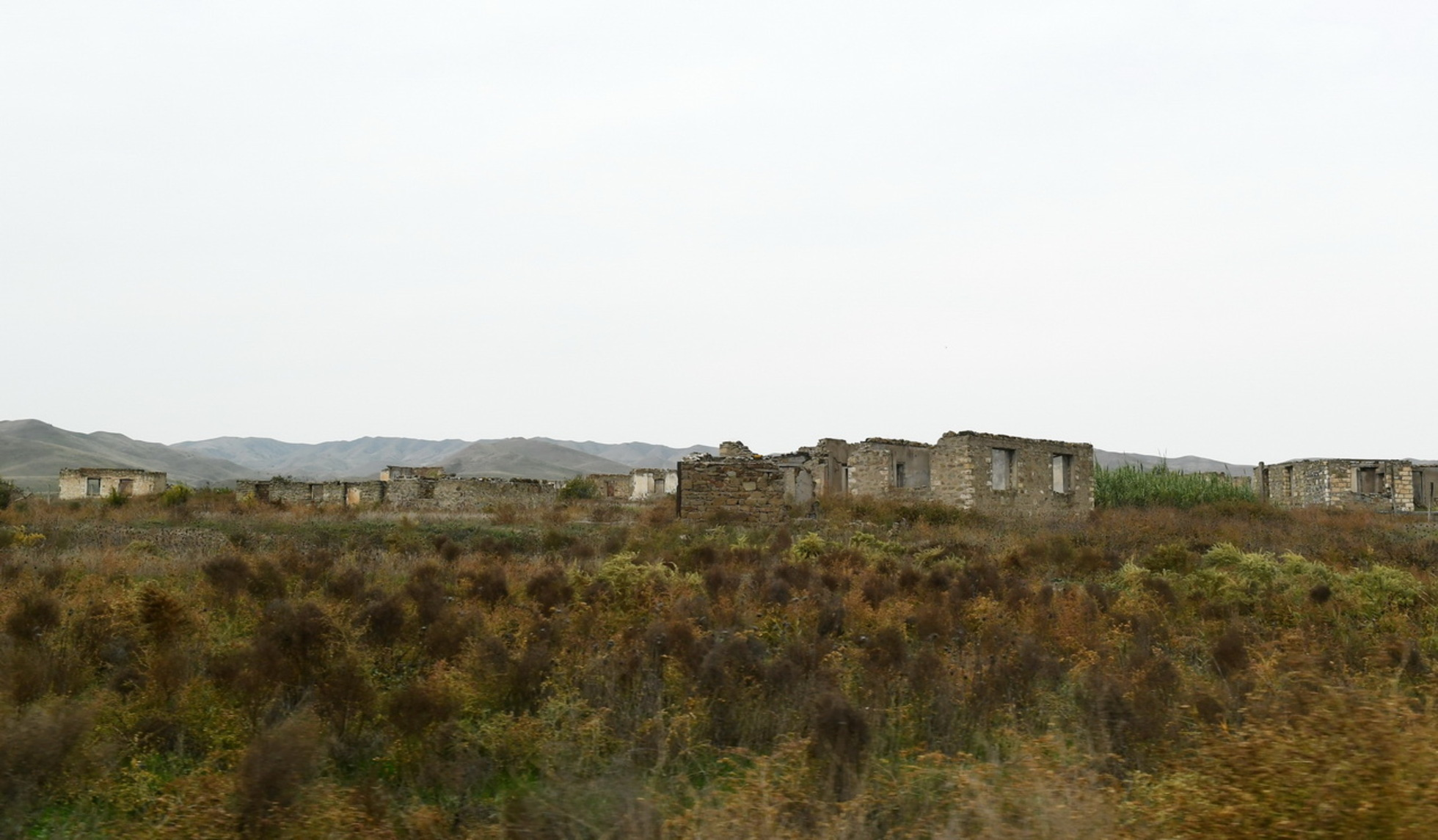
Ruins of the city after the First Nagorno-Karabakh War

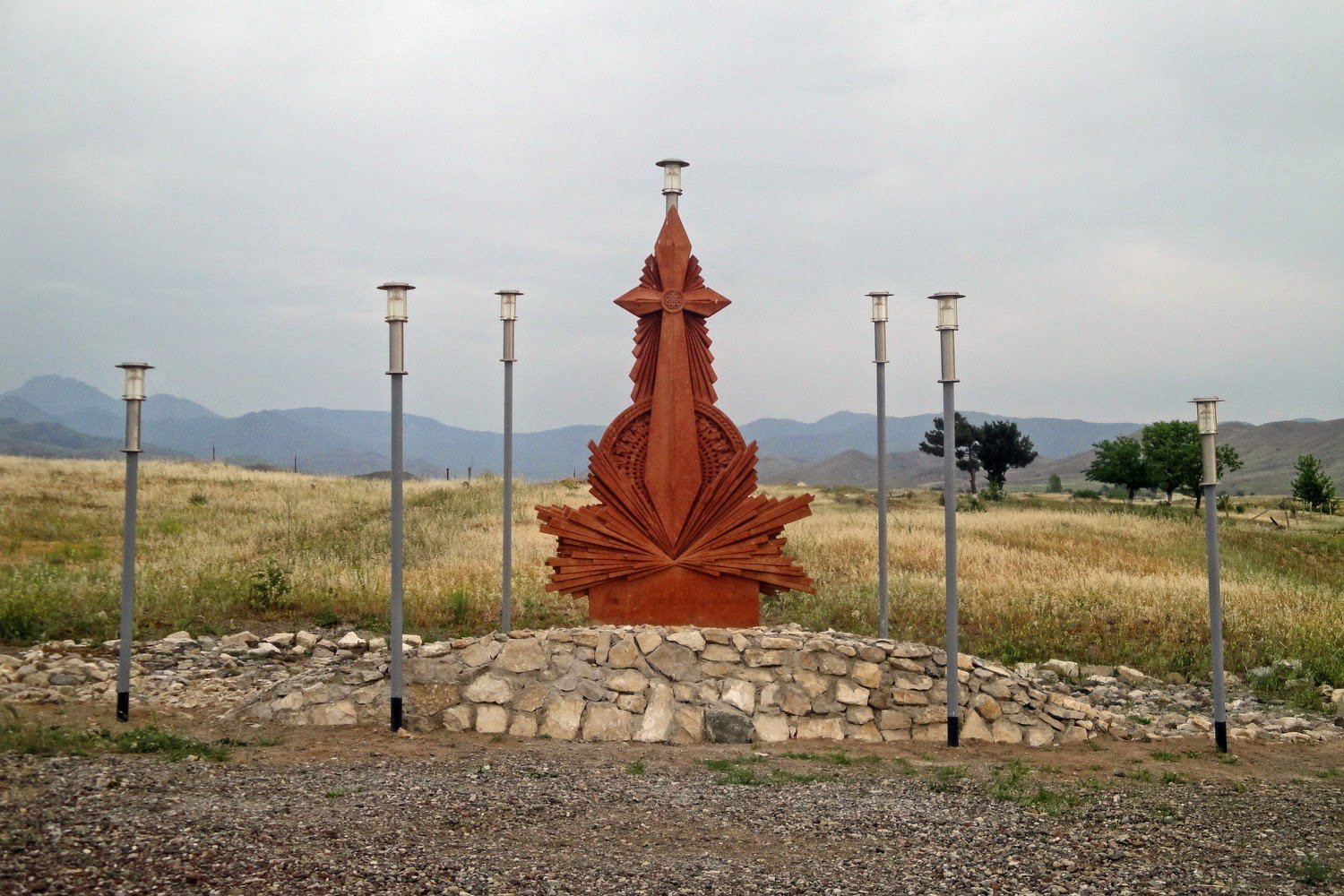
Memorial cross installed by Armenians after the First Nagorno-Karabakh war

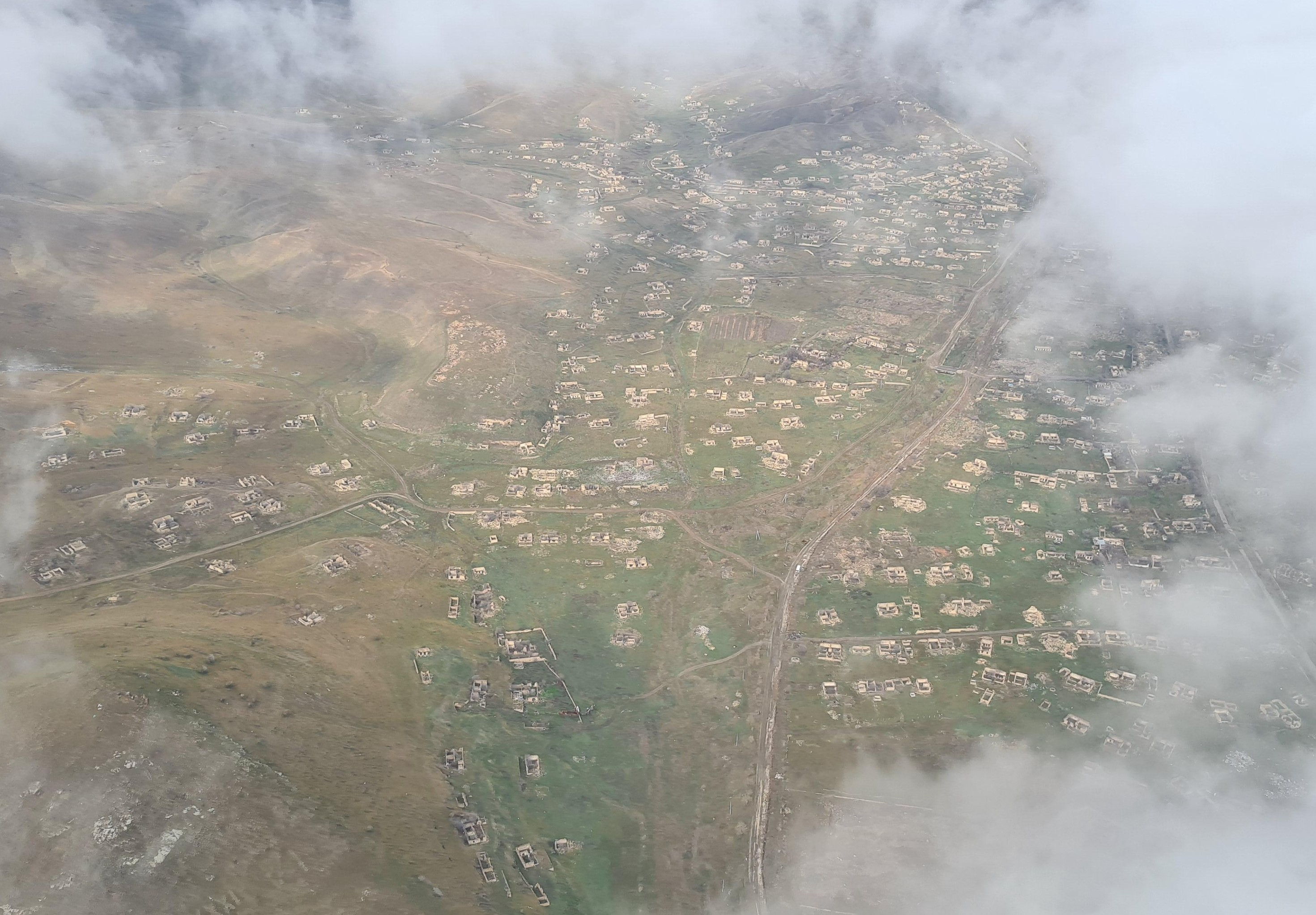
Aerial view of the ruined city, showing destroyed houses

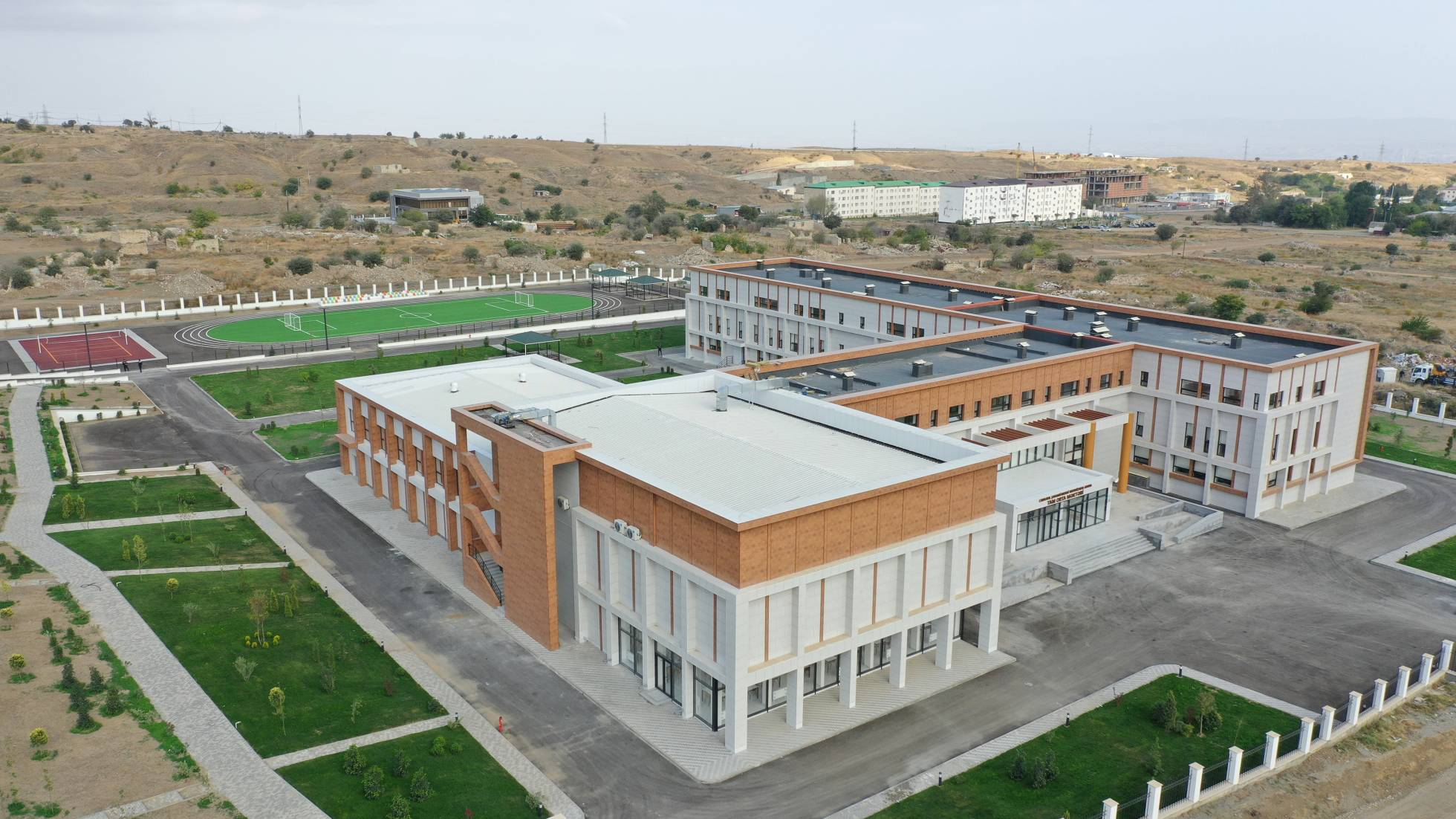
New secondary school built after the Second Karabakh War, in 2021-2024
