= Mastan Aliyev =

Soviet Azerbaijani rifleman (1918–1945)

Mastan Aslan oglu Aliyev
- Məstan Aslan oğlu Əliyev
- Born: 1918; Əsrik Cırdaxan, Yelizavetpol Governorate
- Died: 23 April 1945 (aged 26–27); Tegel, Germany
- Military career
- Allegiance: Soviet Union
- Branch: Red Army
- Service years: 1939–1945
- Rank: Starshina
- Unit: 143rd Rifle Division
- Conflicts: World War II; Battle of Moscow; Battle of Smolensk; Berlin Offensive
- Awards: Hero of the Soviet Union; Order of Lenin; Order of Bogdan Khmelnitsky, 3rd class Order of Glory, 3rd class Medal for Battle Merit

Mastan Aslan oglu Aliyev (Azerbaijani: Məstan Aslan oğlu Əliyev; 1918–23 April 1945) was an Azerbaijani Red Army Starshina and a posthumous Hero of the Soviet Union. Aliyev was posthumously awarded the title for reportedly killing dozens of German soldiers during the Berlin Offensive. He was killed in action during the battle for Tegel.

== Early life ==
Aliyev was born in 1918 in Əsrik Cırdaxan to a peasant family. He received secondary education and became a junior high school teacher. In 1939, Aliyev was drafted into the Red Army.

== World War II ==
Aliyev fought in combat from June 1941. He fought in actions around Kalinin in October, part of the Battle of Moscow. On 2 October he reportedly killed about 30 German soldiers. At Rzhev Aliyev was seriously wounded. In early 1942, he returned to the front. During the battles at Yelnya Aliyev reportedly killed 27 German soldiers but was soon wounded. He returned to the front in 1944 and became a starshina and assistant rifle platoon commander in the 487th Rifle Regiment, part of the 143rd Rifle Division. Aliyev became a Communist Party of the Soviet Union member in the same year. On 9 December he was awarded the Medal for Battle Merit for his actions. On 17 January 1945 Aliyev was awarded the Order of Glory 3rd class for his actions.

In April 1945, Aliyev fought in the Berlin Offensive. On 16 April, after an artillery barrage, he was reportedly the first to attack and killed 24 German soldiers. Aliyev reportedly captured 72 German soldiers along with his platoon. On 23 April, he fought in the capture of Tegel. A large group of German soldiers was positioned in buildings on the outskirts of the city and Aliyev and other soldiers were ordered to dislodge the German troops. Under a heavy fire, Aliyev broke into the first house and reportedly killed several dozen German soldiers. He was killed in the battle for the last house. Aliyev was buried on the northern outskirts of the village of Altrebbin, 8 kilometers southeast of Wriezen. He received the Order of Bogdan Khmelnitsky 3rd class on 13 May for his actions. On 31 May, Aliyev was awarded the title Hero of the Soviet Union and the Order of Lenin.

== Legacy ==
A bust of Aliyev was created in Əsrik Cırdaxan, and a school in the village was named for him.
