= Jamil Ahmadov =

Azerbaijani Red Army rifleman (1924–1944)

Jamil Mahammad oglu Ahmadov
- Cəmil Məmməd oğlu Əhmədov
- Born: 1924; Jabrayil, Azerbaijan SSR, Soviet Union
- Died: 2 September 1944 (aged 19–20) near Malyn, Byelorussian SSR, Soviet Union (now Belarus)
- Military career
- Allegiance: Soviet Union
- Branch: Red Army
- Service years: 1942–1944
- Rank: Lieutenant
- Unit: 55th Guards Rifle Division
- Conflicts: World War II; Operation Bagration
- Awards: Hero of the Soviet Union

Jamil Mahammad oglu Ahmadov (Azerbaijani: Cəmil Məmməd oğlu Əhmədov; 1924 – 2 September 1944) was an Azerbaijani Red Army lieutenant who served as platoon commander of the 168th Guards Rifle Regiment of the 55th Guards Rifle Division. He was awarded the Order of the Red Star following the battle of Ukraine, and received the Hero of the Soviet Union posthumously on 24 March 1945 for his actions in Operation Bagration. Ahmadov reportedly continued to command his platoon while wounded and died of his wounds.

== Early life ==
Ahmadov was born in 1924 in Jabrayil in the Republic of Azerbaijan to the family of a servant. He received secondary education prior to World War II and graduated high school on the eve of the war.

== World War II ==
Ahmadov tried to enlist in June 1941, but was refused due to his young age. He was eventually drafted into the Red Army in March 1942. He graduated from the Ordzhonikidze Infantry School in 1943 and became a platoon commander in the 168th Guards Rifle Regiment of the 55th Guards Rifle Division. He entered into combat in fall 1943 in the North Caucasus. During battles in Ukraine Ahmadov received the Order of the Red Star for his actions.

During the summer of 1944 Ahmedov fought in Operation Bagration. On 23 June, his platoon and three others reportedly ambushed and destroyed a column of German infantry. On 24 June during the storming of German fortifications near Parichi village, Ahmedov reportedly killed more than ten German soldiers in a trench. He was wounded but continued to lead the platoon. On 25 June, his platoon crossed the Tremlia ahead of the main forces. The platoon reportedly supported the crossing with its fire for ten hours. Ahmadov was wounded a second time and reportedly refused to leave the battlefield. On 26 June during the attack on the village of Malyn Ahmadov was wounded in the thigh. He was reportedly carried from the battlefield when he lost consciousness due to blood loss. He was awarded the Order of Alexander Nevsky on 27 July. On 2 September, Ahmadov died of his wounds at Stare in Gmina Nieporęt.

On 24 March 1945, Ahmadov was awarded the title Hero of the Soviet Union and the Order of Lenin. He was buried in Warsaw in the cemetery of Soviet soldiers.

A street and a school in Jabrayil were named for Ahmadov. A bust of Ahmadov was also built.
