= Spitakşen, Shamkir =

Spitakşen
- Location within Azerbaijan
- Coordinates: 40°42′49″N 45°58′22″E
- Country: Azerbaijan
- Rayon: Shamkir
- Time zone: UTC+4 (AZT)
  - Summer (DST): UTC+5 (AZT)

Spitakşen (also, Siptakshen and Garagoyunlu) is a village in the Shamkir Rayon of Azerbaijan.
