= Ağkənd, Zangilan =

Ağkənd
- Location within Azerbaijan
- Coordinates: 39°11′21″N 46°27′15″E
- Country: Azerbaijan
- District: Zangilan
- Time zone: UTC+4 (AZT)
  - Summer (DST): UTC+5 (AZT)

Ağkənd (Aghkend) is a village in the Zangilan District of Azerbaijan. The name means "white village" in the Azerbaijani language.
