= Aslan Vazirov =

Azerbaijani Red Army colonel (1910–1988)

- Aslan Farhad ogli Vəzirov
- Born: 13 December 1910; Zyumyurkhach, Elisabethpol Governorate, Russian Empire
- Died: 27 June 1988 (aged 77); Baku, Azerbaijan SSR, Soviet Union
- Military career
- Allegiance: Soviet Union
- Branch: Red Army
- Service years: 1922–1947
- Rank: Colonel
- Commands: 5th Mountain Mine-Engineer Brigade; 51st Engineer-Sapper Brigade; 1st Guards Assault Engineer-Sapper Brigade
- Conflicts: World War II; Battle of the Caucasus; Operation Bagration; East Prussian Offensive; Vistula-Oder Offensive; Berlin Offensive
- Awards: Hero of the Soviet Union; Order of Lenin; Order of the Red Banner (4x); Order of Kutuzov, 2nd class Order of Bogdan Khmelnitsky, 2nd class Order of the Patriotic War, 1st class

Aslan Farhad oglu Vazirov (Azerbaijani: Aslan Farhad ogli Vəzirov; 13 December 1910 – 27 June 1988) was an Azerbaijani Red Army colonel and Hero of the Soviet Union. Vazirov served in the Red Army's engineer troops during the interwar period. In 1941 and 1942 Vazirov served with the 18th Army's engineering troops. In that year he became commander of the 38th Separate Engineering Regiment. During the Battle of the Caucasus he led the 5th Mountain Mine-Engineer Brigade. In June 1943 he became commander of the 51st Engineer-Sapper Brigade. He commanded the 1st Guards Assault Engineer-Sapper Brigade from May 1944. Vazirov was awarded the title Hero of the Soviet Union on 29 June 1945 for his leadership of the brigade during the Berlin Offensive.

== Early life ==
Vazirov was born on 13 December 1910 in Zyumyurkhach to a peasant family.

In 1922 he went to study at the Transcaucasian Military Preparatory School in Baku. In 1928, Vazirov was sent for further studies to the Leningrad Military Engineering College.

After graduating in 1930, he served in the 5th Rifle Regiment of the 2nd Caucasus Rifle Division in Baku. Vazirov helped train the unit's sappers.

In 1931, he became a member of the Communist Party of the Soviet Union. In 1933 he was transferred to Ovruch as a deputy commander of a sapper company. He later became senior assistant to the chief of the engineering troops of the Kharkov Military District. In early June 1941, Vazirov became senior assistant to the chief of the engineering troops of the 18th Army with the rank of major.

== World War II ==
Vazirov provided transport for retreating Red Army units across the Dniester in Khotyn Raion. He led the destruction of fortifications on the former border. In Haivoron Raion, Vazirov organized troops of the Southern Front to cross the Southern Bug. Near Kicharovka and Kakhovka he organized the retreat across the Dnieper. Vazirov supervised the construction of fortifications on the west bank of the Dnieper to the east of Kakhovka. In the Siniukha River area, the sapper battalion commanded by Vazirov was virtually destroyed by German attacks. Vazirov and ten survivors broke out after a week. In November, Vazirov was awarded the Order of the Red Banner.

As chief of staff of the engineering troops of the Special Army Group of Lieutenant General Kamkov, Vazirov helped create a breakthrough of German defenses in the Lysychansk area. He was then appointed head of combat training of the engineer troops of the 18th Army. In 1942, he was promoted to Lieutenant colonel and became deputy commander of the 38th Separate Engineering Regiment. Vazirov later became the regimental commander. Under his command, the regiment helped the crossing of Soviet troops over the Kuban and created fortifications at Goytkhsky Pass and on the outskirts of Tuapse and Novorossiysk. For some time Vazirov was deputy commander of the 64th Separate Engineer-Sapper Brigade. He then became commander of the 5th Mountain Mine-Engineer Brigade on the North Caucasian Front. Under his command, the brigade helped the offensive towards Ordzhonikidze, Nevinnomyssk, Mineralnye Vody, Stavropol, and Taman. In June 1943, Vazirov was promoted to colonel.

In June 1943, Vazirov became commander of the 51st Engineer-Sapper Brigade. Under his command, the brigade assisted the offensive of the 1st Guards Army and 46th Army. The brigade helped in the crossings of the Siversky Donets in Zmiiv Raion and the Dnieper in the Dnipropetrovsk and Dniprodzerzhynsk area. When crossing the Dnieper Vazirov's brigade built about a kilometer of bridges within two days. South of Dniprodzherzhinsk, the brigade advanced directly with the forward units, under German fire. For its actions the brigade received the honorific Dniproderzhynsk. For his actions, Vazirov was awarded the Order of Bogdan Khmelnitsky 2nd class.

During subsequent battles Vazirov led the brigade during the capture of Krivoy Rog and Apostolove and the crossing of the Southern Bug at Nova Odesa. The brigade successfully crossed the Dniester to the south of Bender. For this action, Vazirov was awarded the Order of Kutuzov 2nd class on 12 June 1944. In May 1944, Vazirov was appointed commander of the 1st Guards Assault-Engineering Brigade. On 19 June, the brigade became part of the 2nd Belorussian Front and fought in breaking the German defenses on the Pronya River and Basya River. The brigade crossed the Dnieper in Mogilev Region. The brigade received the honorific Mogilev. Vazirov reportedly directed the Dnieper crossing of the 69th Rifle Corps and was wounded twice, but did not leave the battlefield. For his actions, he received the Order of the Red Banner on 25 August 1944.

On 15–16 July, the 1st Guards Assault-Engineering Brigade assisted the crossing of the Neman in the Grodno District. The brigade helped clear the minefields on the outskirts of Grodno and participated in the repulse of counterattacks and the capture of the city. In August, the brigade built a 180-meter bridge across the Bzhazuvka under German fire, reportedly ensuring the capture of Osowiec Fortress on 14 August. For this actions, Vazirov was awarded a third Order of the Red Banner on 3 November 1944. In September, the brigade as part of the 48th Army and 2nd Shock Army assisted the breakthrough of heavily fortified German defenses on the Narew in East Prussia north of Warsaw. The soldiers of the brigade reportedly defused more than 22,000 mines. During the development of the offensive and the advance to Danzig Bay, Vazirov reportedly directed the actions of two shock battalions (flamethrower and engineer-sapper) during the assault and capture of Graudenz. For his actions Vazirov was awarded the Order of the Red Banner on 13 March 1945.

After the capture of Danzig, on 13 April 1945 the brigade was relocated to the area south of Stettin and became part of the 70th Army, assisting the Oder crossing at Greifenhagen. During the Berlin Offensive, the brigade reportedly created seven amphibious ferries across the Oder by 19 April. In the Schoening area 12 kilometers south of Stettin, the brigade helped the 136th Rifle Division cross the Oder. Then Vezirov reportedly led the crossing of 70th Army units under heavy fire. For three days he reportedly did not leave the river. For this action, Vazirov was recommended for the title Hero of the Soviet Union. On 1 May, along with other units, the 1st Guards Assault-Engineering Brigade captured the cities of Rostock and Wismar, reaching the Elbe. Berlin fell on the next day. The brigade worked to clear the streets of Rostock. On 29 June, Vazirov was awarded the title Hero of the Soviet Union and the Order of Lenin for his actions during the crossing of the Oder.

== Postwar ==
In 1947, Vazirov was transferred to the reserve.

From 1952 to 1958 he lived in Voronezh. Since 1958 he lived in Baku.

Since April 1960 he was the head of the Azerbaijani Society of Hunters and Fisherman.

Since 1965 he was chairman of the Baku chapter of the Soviet Committee of War Veterans.

In 1980 he became a deputy of the Supreme Soviet of the Azerbaijan SSR

On 6 April 1985 he was awarded the Order of the Patriotic War 1st class on the 40th anniversary of the end of the war. Vazirov died on 27 June 1988.

== Legacy ==
In Mogilev and Mamonovo there are busts of Vazirov. In Mogilev, there is a memorial plaque at House Number 8 on Pervomayskaya Street.

== Awards ==
Vazirov received the following awards.

- Hero of the Soviet Union (29 June 1945)
- Order of Lenin (29 June 1945)
- four Orders of the Rad Banner (4 November 1941, 25 August 1944, 3 November 1944, 13 March 1945)
- Order of Kutuzov 2nd class (12 June 1944)
- Order of Bogdan Khmelnitsky 3rd class (22 February 1944)
- Order of the Cross of Grunwald 2nd class
- Order of the Patriotic War 1st class (6 April 1985)
- several medals

- Medal "For the Victory over Germany in the Great Patriotic War 1941–1945"

- honorary citizen of Baku (since 1985)

== Sources ==
- Золотые звёзды Азербайджана. Баку, 1975. стр.72-73
- Навечно в сердце народном. 3-е изд., доп. и испр. Минск, 1984. стр.91
