= Shamsulla Aliyev =

Azerbaijani Red Army captain (1915–1943)

Shamsulla Faizullah oglu Aliyev
- Şəmsulla Feyzulla oğlu Əliyev
- Born: 17 April 1915; Derbent, Dagestan Oblast, Russian Empire
- Died: 19 November 1943 (aged 28) near Kerch, Crimean ASSR, RSFSR, Soviet Union
- Military career
- Allegiance: Soviet Union
- Branch: Red Army
- Service years: 1942–1943
- Rank: Captain
- Unit: 339th Rifle Division
- Conflicts: World War II; Battle of the Caucasus; Kerch-Eltigen Operation †
- Awards: Hero of the Soviet Union

Shamsulla Faizullah oglu Aliyev (Azerbaijani: Şəmsulla Feyzulla oğlu Əliyev, Russian: Шамсула Файзулла оглы Алиев; 4 April 1915 – 19 November 1943) was an Azerbaijani Red Army captain and a posthumous Hero of the Soviet Union. Aliyev was posthumously awarded the title on 16 May 1944 for his leadership of a battalion during the Kerch–Eltigen Operation. During the operation, Aliyev's battalion captured the Kerch Metallurgical Plant and reportedly killed 250 German soldiers. He was killed in action a week later on the outskirts of Kerch.

== Early life ==
Aliyev was born in Derbent on 17 April 1915 in the family of a teacher. He graduated from the Derbent Teacher College and worked as a teacher.

== World War II ==
In 1942, Aliyev was drafted into the Red Army. He graduated from an accelerated course at the Baku Infantry School in the same year. From September, he fought in combat. Aliyev fought in the Battle of the Caucasus during the fighting around Mozdok and then the recapture of Novorossiysk. He became a machine-gun company commander in the 3rd Separate Rifle Battalion of the 157th Rifle Brigade. For his actions, Aliyev was awarded the Order of the Red Star on 31 May 1943. He became a deputy battalion commander in the 1135th Rifle Regiment of the 339th Rifle Division.

Aliyev fought in the Kerch–Eltigen Operation in November 1943. On 11 November, his battalion reportedly repulsed three counterattacks, destroying two companies of German soldiers. During the battle for the expansion of the bridgehead, Aliyev reportedly led the battalion's attacks. After breaking through two defensive lines, the battalion broke into the Kerch Metallurgical Plant. During this battle, they reportedly killed 250 German soldiers, capturing an ammunition depot and equipment. For his actions, Aliyev was awarded the Order of the Patriotic War 1st class on 18 November. On 19 November, Aliyev was killed in action on the outskirts of Kerch. He was buried in the city. Aliyev was posthumously awarded the title Hero of the Soviet Union and the Order of Lenin on 16 May 1944.

== Legacy ==
A garment factory and a sovkhoz in Derbent were named after Aliyev. School No. 4 in Derbent is named for Aliyev. A monument was created at the Central Sovkhoz in Derbent. Aliyev's name is engraved on a plaque on Mount Mithridat in Kerch. A street in Makhachkala is named for Aliyev.
