= Aşağı Fərəcan =

Ashaghy Farajan Հարար • Harar
- Azerbaijani: Aşağı Fərəcan
- Location within Azerbaijan Location within East Zangezur Economic Region
- Coordinates: 39°31′43″N 46°39′40″E
- Country: Azerbaijan
- District: Lachin

Population (2015)
  - Total: 44
- Time zone: UTC+4 (AZT)

Aşağı Fərəcan (Ashaghy Farajan, Armenian: Հարար, romanized: Harar, also Arar and Jafarabad) is a village in the Lachin District of Azerbaijan.

== History ==
The village suffered during the Armenian–Azerbaijani War in 1918-1920. According to Armenian historian Richard G. Hovannisian, at the end of November 1918, local Azerbaijanis destroyed Harar and two other Armenian villages, Spitakashen and Petrosashen, the three remaining Armenian villages between Nagorno-Karabakh and Zangezur, thus dividing the two mountainous regions.

The village was located in the Armenian-occupied territories surrounding Nagorno-Karabakh, coming under the control of ethnic Armenian forces during the First Nagorno-Karabakh War in the early 1990s. The village subsequently became part of the breakaway Republic of Artsakh as part of its Kashatagh Province. It was returned to Azerbaijan as part of the 2020 Nagorno-Karabakh ceasefire agreement.

== Historical heritage sites ==
Historical heritage sites in and around the village include the 15th/16th-century St. Stephen's Church (Armenian: Սուրբ Ստեփանոս եկեղեցի, romanized: Surb Stepanos Yekeghetsi).

== Demographics ==
According to the Russian census in 1897, 523 people lived in the village, all Armenians. In 1921, 55 people lived in the village, all Armenians.
