= Avaz Verdiyev =

Azerbaijani Red Army senior sergeant (1916–1945)

- Əvəz Həşim oğlu Verdiyev
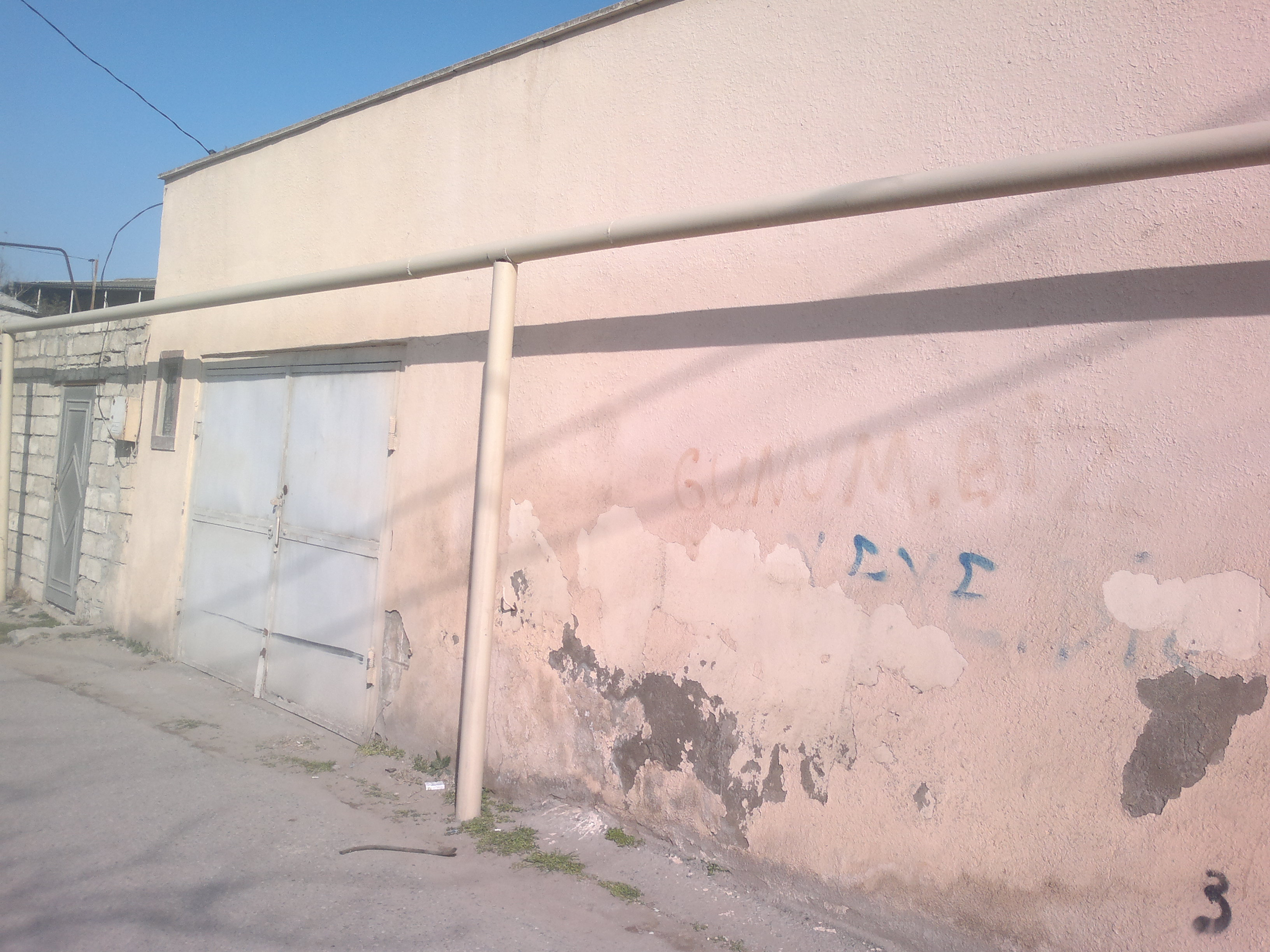
- Born: 1916; Bülbülə, Baku, Baku Governorate, Russian Empire
- Died: 1 May 1945 (aged 28–29); Bolesławiec, Poland
- Military career
- Allegiance: Soviet Union
- Branch: Red Army
- Service years: 1939–1940; 1941–1945
- Rank: Senior Sergeant
- Units: 55th Guards Tank Brigade, 7th Guards Tank Corps
- Conflicts: Soviet invasion of Poland; Winter War; World War II; Lvov-Sandomierz Offensive; Battle of Berlin
- Awards: Hero of the Soviet Union

Avaz Hashim oglu Verdiyev (Azerbaijani: Əvəz Həşim oğlu Verdiyev; 1916–1 May 1945) was an Azerbaijani Red Army Senior Sergeant and a Hero of the Soviet Union. Verdiyev was awarded the title on 23 September 1944 for his actions during the Lvov–Sandomierz Offensive. During the offensive, he reportedly raised the red flag at the Staszów town hall during its capture. Verdiyev was seriously wounded in the Battle of Berlin and died of wounds on 1 May 1945.

== Early life ==
Verdiyev was born in 1916 in Bülbülə to a working-class family. He was orphaned at the age of three. Verdiyev then moved to Kushchular. At the age of 20 he returned to Baku, working at the Ordzhonikidze Engineering Plant, where he studied at a school for working youth. In 1939 Verdiyev was drafted into the Red Army. He fought in the Soviet invasion of Poland and the Winter War. He was demobilized in 1940 and returned to Baku, working at the plant.

== World War II ==
Verdiyev was drafted into the Red Army again in June 1941. He fought in combat from December on. During fighting near Rostov-on-Don Verdiyev was wounded. A few months later, after recovering from his wound, Verdiyev returned to the front. He fought in battles in Ukraine and Poland. From 1944 he served with the infantry battalion of the 55th Guards Tank Brigade of the 7th Guards Tank Corps. He became a submachine gun squad leader and Senior Sergeant.

He fought in the Lvov–Sandomierz Offensive during the summer of 1944. On 22 July, during the attack on Kulykiv in Lviv Oblast, Verdiyev and his squad reportedly bypassed the German positions. They reportedly used grenades to destroy two medium machine guns and two mortars, allowing the battalion's advance. On 31 July his squad crossed the Vistula near Baranów Sandomierski. Verdiyev helped capture a bridgehead on the left bank and his squad reportedly destroyed two German machine guns. On 2 August, during the battle for Staszów, the squad advanced to the German firing positions and with grenades reportedly destroyed a machine gun and three mortars. Verdiyev reportedly advanced into the city riding on the hull of a tank. Along with the tank commander, he reportedly hoisted a red flag over the town hall, capturing two German soldiers. On 23 September Verdiyev was awarded the title Hero of the Soviet Union and the Order of Lenin.

During the storming of Zehlendorf, a suburb of Berlin, during the Battle of Berlin, Verdiyev was seriously wounded on 26 April 1945. He died on 1 May at the hospital. He was buried in the city of Boleslawiec in Poland.

== Legacy ==
Busts of Verdiyev were placed at his home in Baku and in Lachin. A plaque was placed on the factory where he worked.
