= Ağkənd, Tartar =

Ağkənd
- Municipality
- Location within Azerbaijan Location within Karabakh Economic Region
- Coordinates: 40°23′N 46°54′E
- Country: Azerbaijan
- Rayon: Tartar
- Time zone: UTC+4 (AZT)
  - Summer (DST): UTC+5 (AZT)

Ağkənd (known as Təzəkənd until 2015) is a village and municipality in the Tartar Rayon of Azerbaijan.
