= Ali Verdiyev =

Azerbaijani artist and pedagogue (1936–2020)

Ali Verdiyev Əli Verdiyev
- Born: January 30, 1936; Baku, Azerbaijan SSR, TSFSR, USSR
- Died: May 8, 2020 (aged 84)
- Citizenship: Soviet Union→ Azerbaijan; Turkey
- Education: Azim Azimzade Azerbaijan State Art School, Repin Institute of Arts, Saint Petersburg Academy of Art
- Occupation: painter
- Awards: Order of the Badge of Honour Honored Artist of the Azerbaijan SSR "Lenin Komsomol" award of the Azerbaijan SSR

Ali Mursal oghlu Verdiyev (Azerbaijani: Əli Mürsəl oğlu Verdiyev, January 30, 1936 – May 8, 2020) was an Azerbaijani artist, pedagogue, Honored Artist of the Azerbaijan SSR (1982).

== Biography ==
Ali Mursal oghlu Verdiyev was born in 1936 in Baku. After graduating from Azim Azimzade State Art School in 1958, he studied in St. Petersburg for 10 years, studied at the Repin Institute of Painting, Sculpture and Architecture, Leningrad Vera Mukhina Higher School of Art and Design.

The artist, who moved to Istanbul in 1995, later started working in Kayseri and became a professor at Erciyes University.

Ali Verdiyev died on May 8, 2020.

== Career ==
During his creative activity, Ali Verdiyev applied to various topics and genres, clear and precise paintings took a central place in his work. He was the author of compositions with various plots. His "Abolition of Illiteracy" (1969), "Youth" (1970), "Golden Wedding" (1971), "The Road to Heaven and Hell" (1973), "Victory of Labor" (1977), "Memories" (1980), "Old Age" (1980), "Exciting Day" (1995), "Sea Trip" (1997), "Folklore" (1998), "Azykh Cave" (2011) and other compositions are considered to be of this type. Among his works in this genre, the portraits of "Adila", "Fatma" and his daughter Zemfira, which he painted with a brush at a young age, have special importance.

Ali Verdiyev was also engaged in scientific and methodical activities. He is the author of methodical works such as "Painter-pedagogue", "The influence of color in painting", "Ease painting".

The artist participated in the international exhibition in Moscow for the first time in 1957, and in the following years participated in exhibitions of various scales. He participated in exhibitions in Italy, Japan, Austria, Finland, Sweden, Turkey, Luxembourg, Czechoslovakia, Bulgaria, GDR, FRG, Vietnam and other countries.

== Awards ==
- Honored Artist of the Azerbaijan SSR — December 1, 1982
- "Lenin Komsomol" award of the Azerbaijan SSR
- Order of the Badge of Honour — 1986
- Medal "For Distinguished Labour" — 1976
