= Spitakashen, Martuni =

Spitakashen Սպիտակաշեն Ağkənd
- Location within Azerbaijan Location within Karabakh Economic Region
- Coordinates: 39°49′24″N 47°01′04″E
- Country: Azerbaijan
  - District: Khojavend
- Elevation: 687 m (2,254 ft)

Population (2015)
  - Total: 453
- Time zone: UTC+4 (AZT)

Spitakashen (Armenian: Սպիտակաշեն) or Aghkend (Azerbaijani: Ağkənd) is a village in the Khojavend District of Azerbaijan, in the disputed region of Nagorno-Karabakh. Until 2023 it was controlled by the breakaway Republic of Artsakh. The village had an ethnic Armenian-majority population until the expulsion of the Armenian population of Nagorno-Karabakh by Azerbaijan following the 2023 Azerbaijani offensive in Nagorno-Karabakh.

== Etymology ==
The village's name means "white village" in both Armenian and Azerbaijani.

== History ==
During the Soviet period, the village was a part of the Martuni District of the Nagorno-Karabakh Autonomous Oblast.

== Historical heritage sites ==
Historical heritage sites in and around the village include the 13th-century Holy Savior Church (Armenian: Սուրբ Ամենափրկիչ Եկեղեցի, romanized: Surb Amenaprkich Yekeghetsi) and a 13th-century cemetery.

== Economy and culture ==
The population is mainly engaged in agriculture and animal husbandry. As of 2015, the village has a municipal building, a house of culture, a secondary school, and a medical centre.

== Demographics ==
The village had 437 inhabitants in 2005, and 453 inhabitants in 2015.
