= Zangezur Mountains =

Mountain range

Zangezur
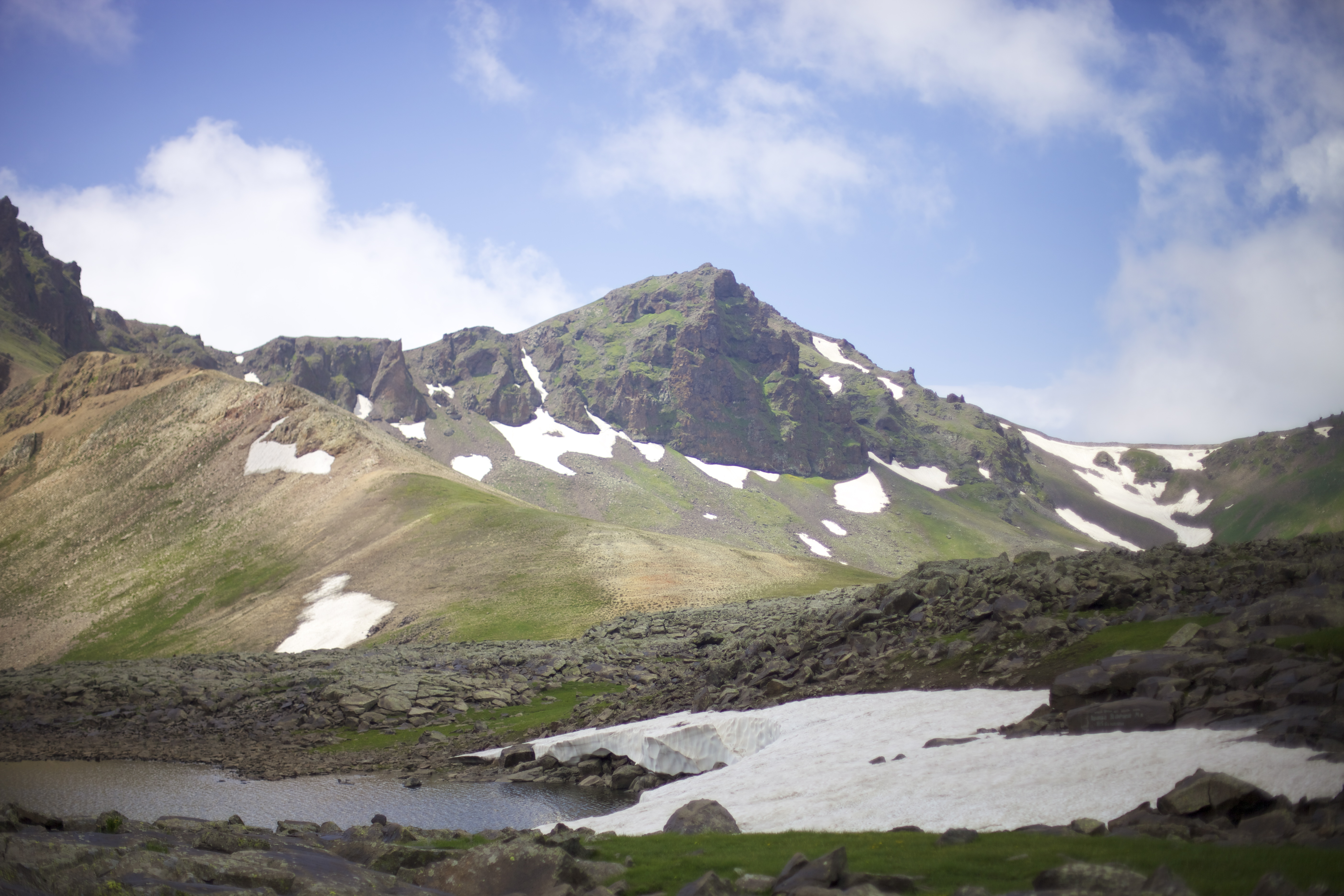
- Zangezur Mountains, Sisian, Armenia

Highest point
- Peak: Mount Kaputjugh
- Elevation: 3,905 m (12,812 ft)
- Coordinates: 39°09′33″N 46°00′21″E

Naming
- Native name: Զանգեզուրի լեռներ (Armenian); Zangəzur dağları (Azerbaijani)

Geography
- Countries: Armenia and Azerbaijan
- Regions/Provinces: Syunik, Vayots Dzor and Nakhchivan Autonomous Republic
- Range coordinates: 39°09′N 46°00′E

The Zangezur Mountains (Armenian: Զանգեզուրի լեռներ or Սյունյաց լեռներ, ) are a mountain range that defines the border between Armenia's southern provinces of Syunik, Vayots Dzor, and Azerbaijan's Nakhchivan Autonomous Republic. The Zangezur region has the second-largest tract of forests in Armenia. Additionally, located in the Zangezur Mountains, the forests cover more than 20% of the territory of Armenian Syunik province and reach an elevation of 2,200 metres (7,200 ft)-2,400 metres (7,900 ft).

== Conservation ==
Part of the Zangezur Mountains in Armenia is included in the Arevik National Park. There are also three Prime Butterfly Areas (PBA) designated and one proposed at the eastern slopes of the Zangezur Mountains. In the Nakhchivan exclave of Azerbaijan, the mountains are included within the Zangezur National Park, located in the north of Ordubad District.

== Gallery ==
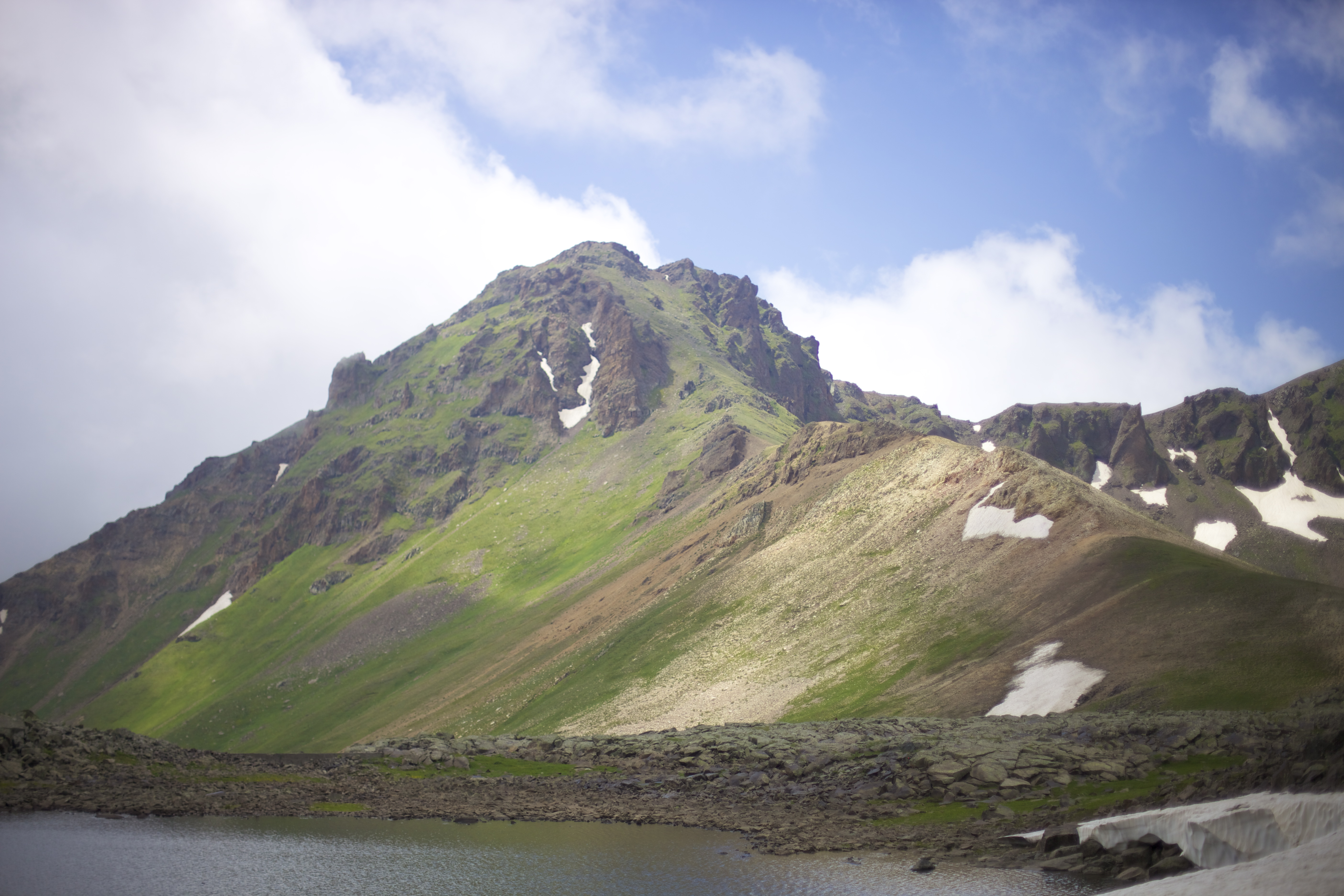

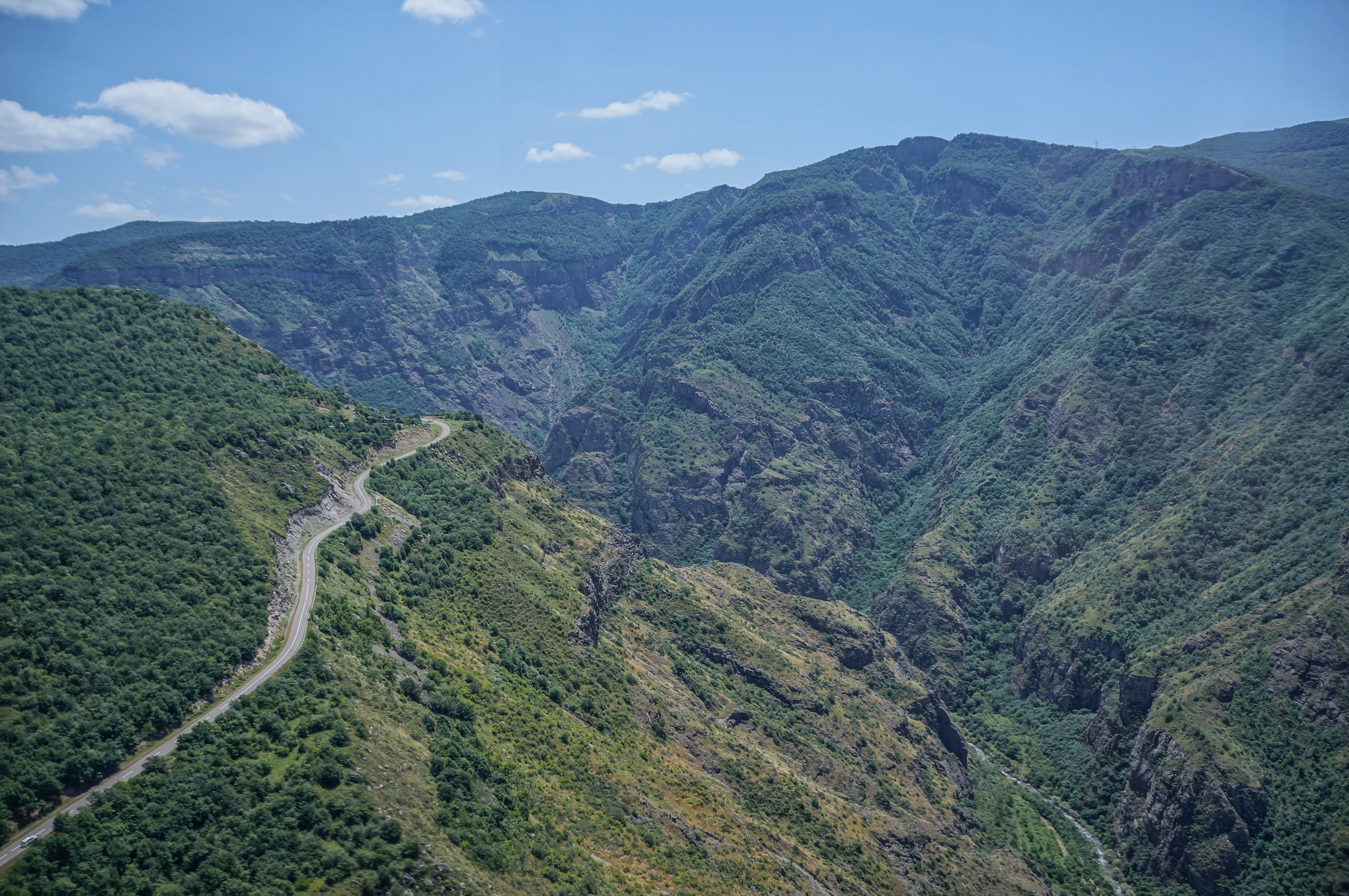

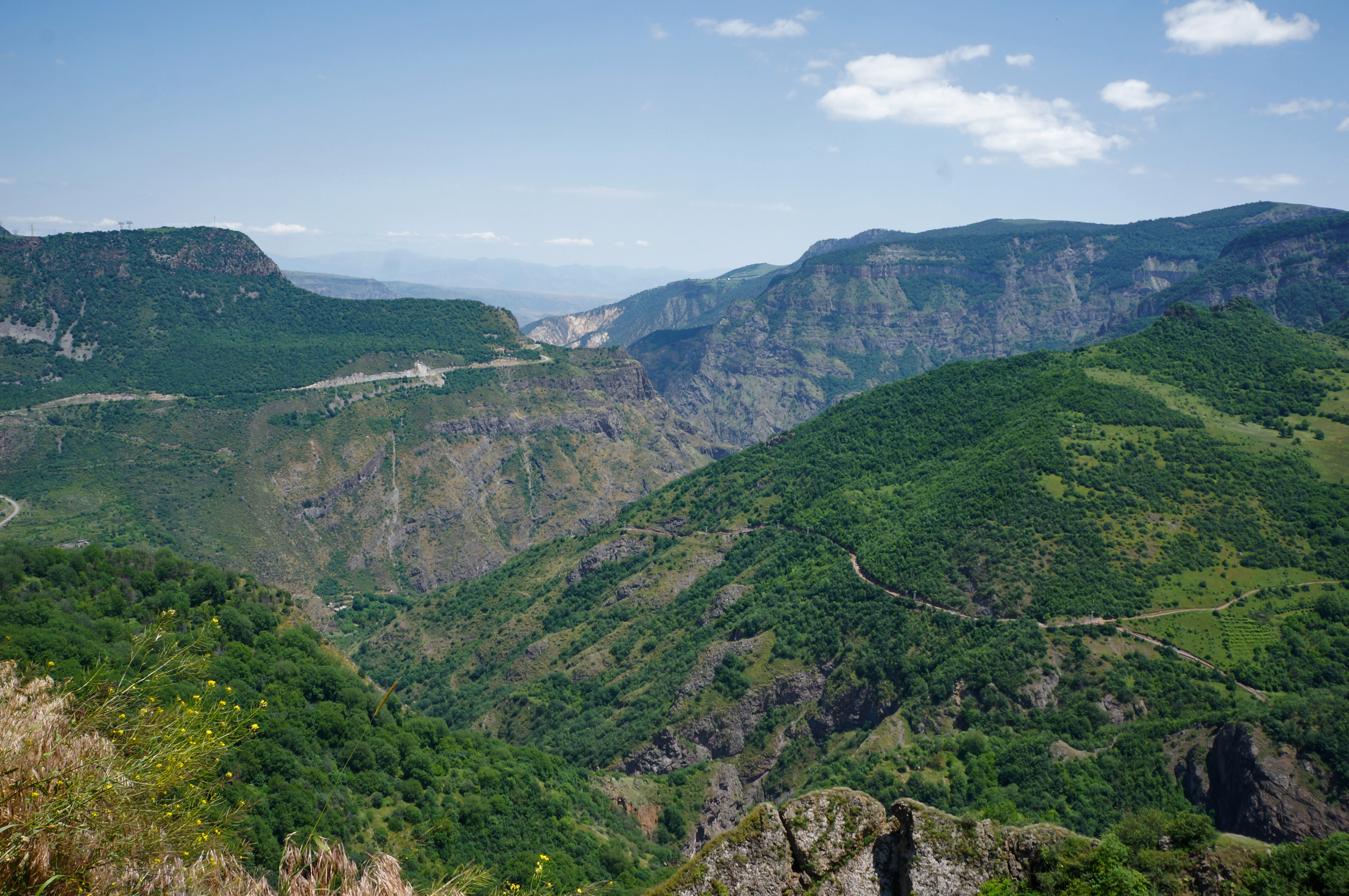

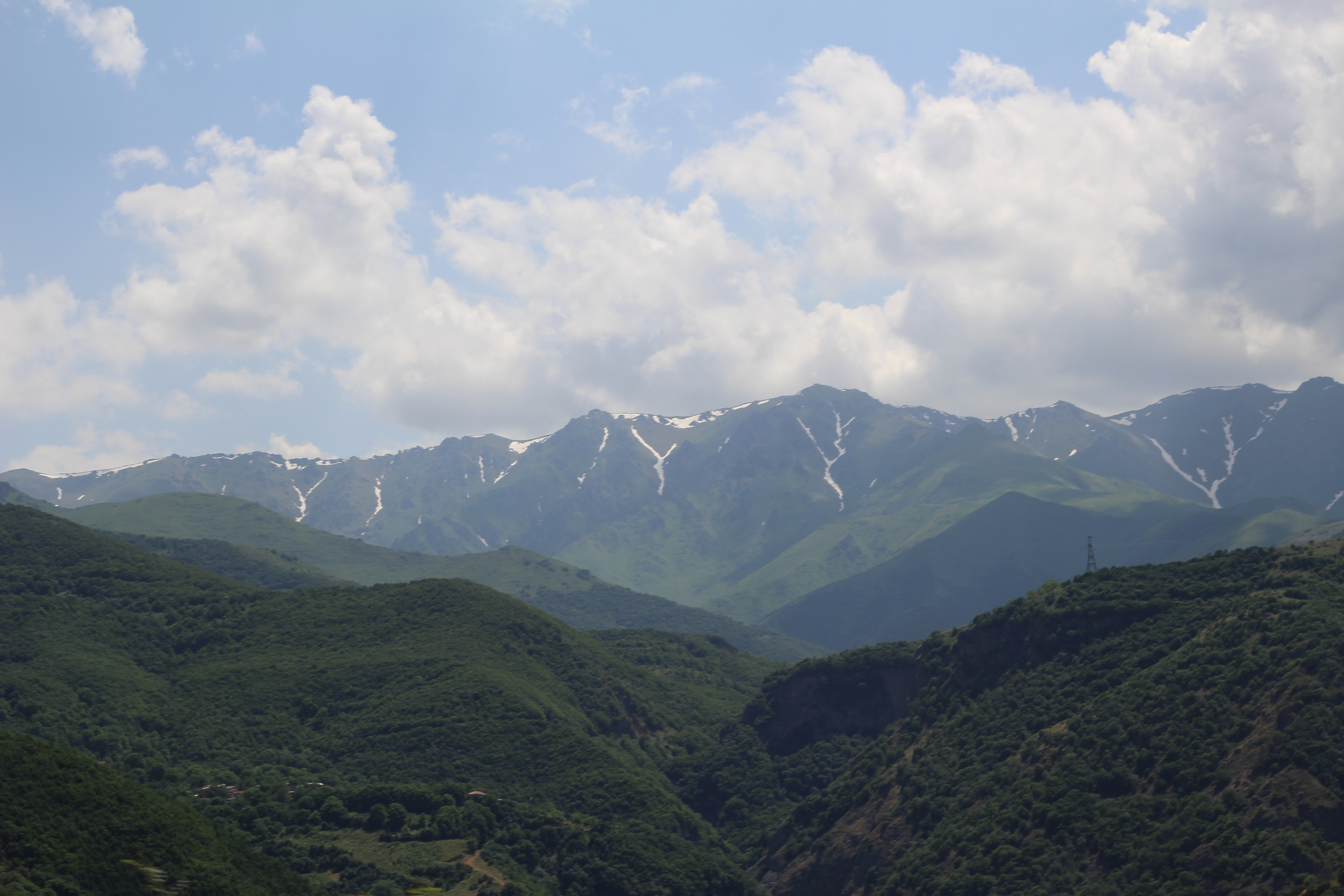

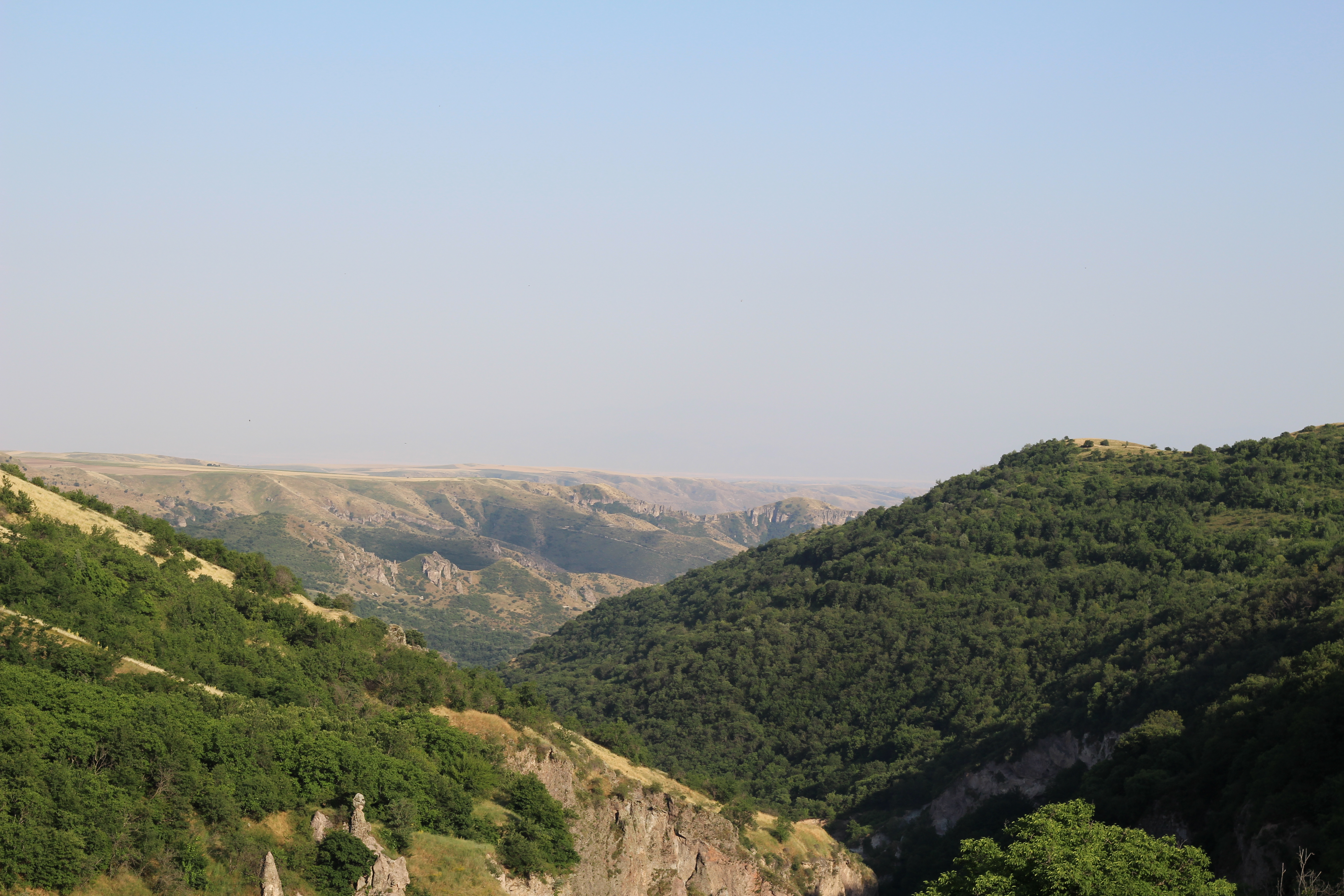

== See also ==
- Geography of Armenia
- Geography of Azerbaijan
