= Teghut mine =

Copper and molybdenum mine in Armenia

Teghut Mine
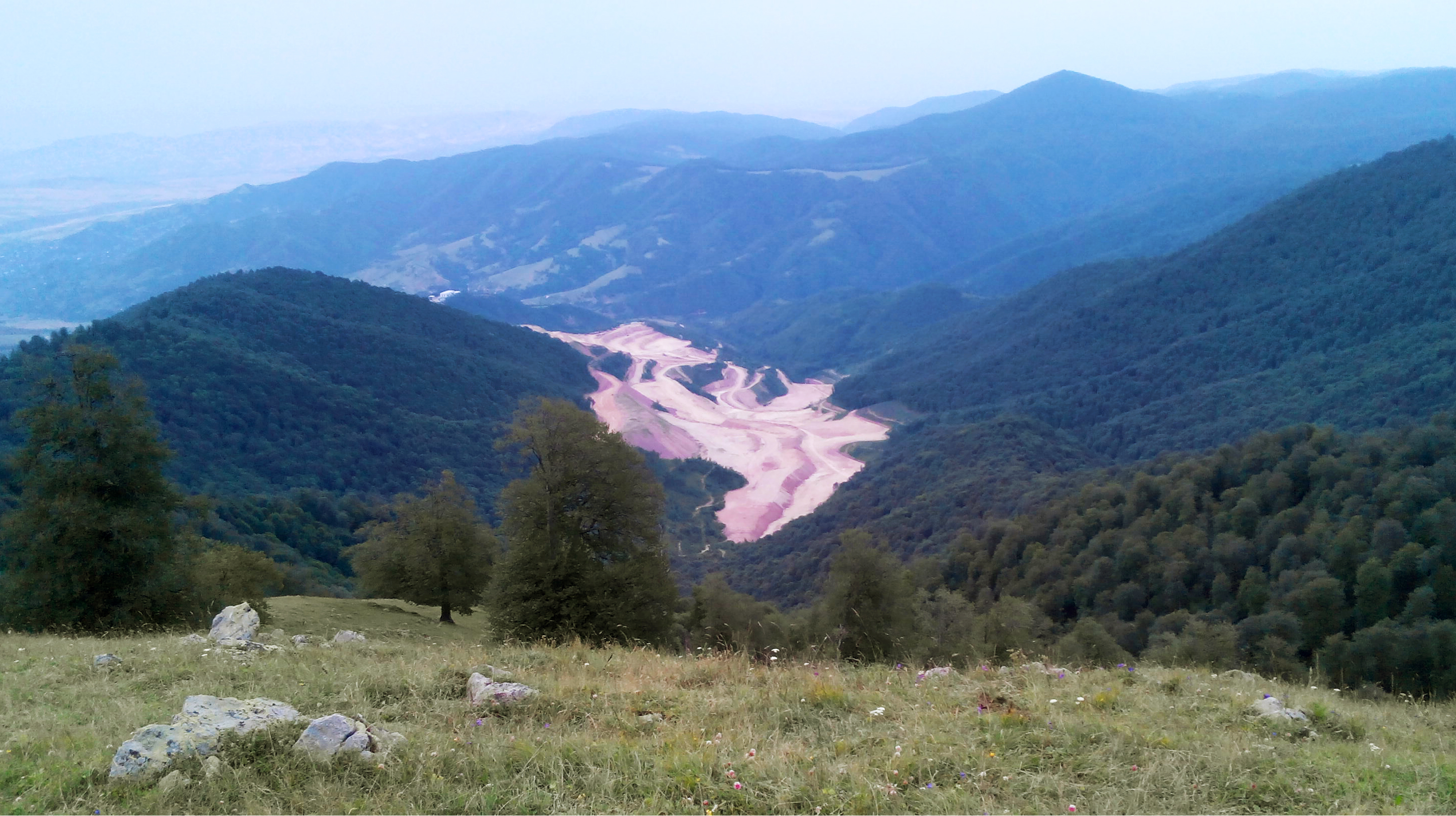
- Open-pit mining at Teghut (summer 2014)

- Location in Armenia
- Location: Teghut, Lori, Armenia; 41°05′17″N 44°50′47″E
- Products: Copper, molybdenum
- Production: 1.6 million tons of copper 100,000 tons of molybdenum
- Type: Open pit
- Opened: 2014
- Active: 2014 - Feb 2018
- Closed: 2018 (suspended)
- Company: Vallex Group (via Armenian Copper Programme)
- Website: www.teghout.am
- Acquired: 2001

Teghut Mine is a closed copper and molybdenum open-pit mine in Armenia's northern province of Lori in the village of Teghut with deposits valued at US$15.5 billion (in 2010). In December 2014, Vallex Group launched production operations at the mine, which is a US$380 million project. In February 2018 Vallex Group published a statement announcing suspension of all operations and laying off nearly all staff.

The mine was expected become comparable in size to the Kajaran Mine in southern Armenia.

== Available deposits and value ==
The Teghut forest lies atop ore deposits containing an estimated 1.6 million tons of copper and about 100,000 tons of molybdenum. In 2010, with the price of copper at US$7,500 per ton and molybdenum at US$35,000 per ton, this amounts to about US$12 billion in copper and US$3.5 billion in molybdenum. Therefore, the total value of the mine's deposits was about $15.5 billion in 2010.

== Mine financing and ownership ==
Vallex, which is run and at least partly owned by Russian-Armenian businessman Valeri Mejlumyan, claims to have already invested almost $340 million in Teghut. It has borrowed the bulk of that money from VTB, a leading Russian bank.

In 2013, the company also attracted $62 million in funding from a Danish pension fund which was due to be partly or fully channeled into purchases of metallurgical equipment from another Danish company, FLSmidth. In 2017, the Danish state credit agency decided to withdraw export credit guarantees to mine operators, accusing its private owner of failing to comply with environmental standards.

== Notable incidents, statements and events ==
=== Assessments before opening ===
Pre-project reports indicated that open-pit mining at Teghut will lead to the destruction of 357 hectares of rich forest, including 128,000 trees. Environmentalists claimed that ore crushing and enrichment will also pollute a local river and underground waters.

=== 2014 - Statements by the mine operator ===
Vallex claimed to have created about 1,300 new jobs and pledged to build new schools and upgrade infrastructure in nearby villages.

The company said that it planned to manufacture $182 million worth of non-ferrous ore concentrates there in 2015.

=== 2017 August - Mine operator acknowledges environmental pollution ===
At public hearings, Vallex Deputy Director General Sahak Karapetyan didn't reject the fact of environmental pollution and promised to find a solution.

=== 2017 October - Funding withdrawal due to environmental issues ===
After a series of warnings, the Danish state agency EKF decided to withdraw export credit guarantees to mine operators, accusing its private owner of failing to comply with agreed environmental standards.

=== 2017 December - Discontent of community residents ===
Community residents formally demanded that the Ministry of Nature Protection cancels the mine expansion project.

=== 2018 January - Leak into river ===
By the end of January 2018, reports were published that the mine's tailings dam had cracks, and that unprocessed mine waste leaked into Shnogh River, making it become visibly polluted. However, the Ministry of Nature Protection maintained that its measurements were unable to determine that there was any river pollution.

=== 2018 February - Vallex Group declared suspension of all operations ===
The mine operator issued a statement declaring it will suspend all operations and lay off all workers except for few responsible for preservation of existing infrastructure.

== Gallery ==
2015

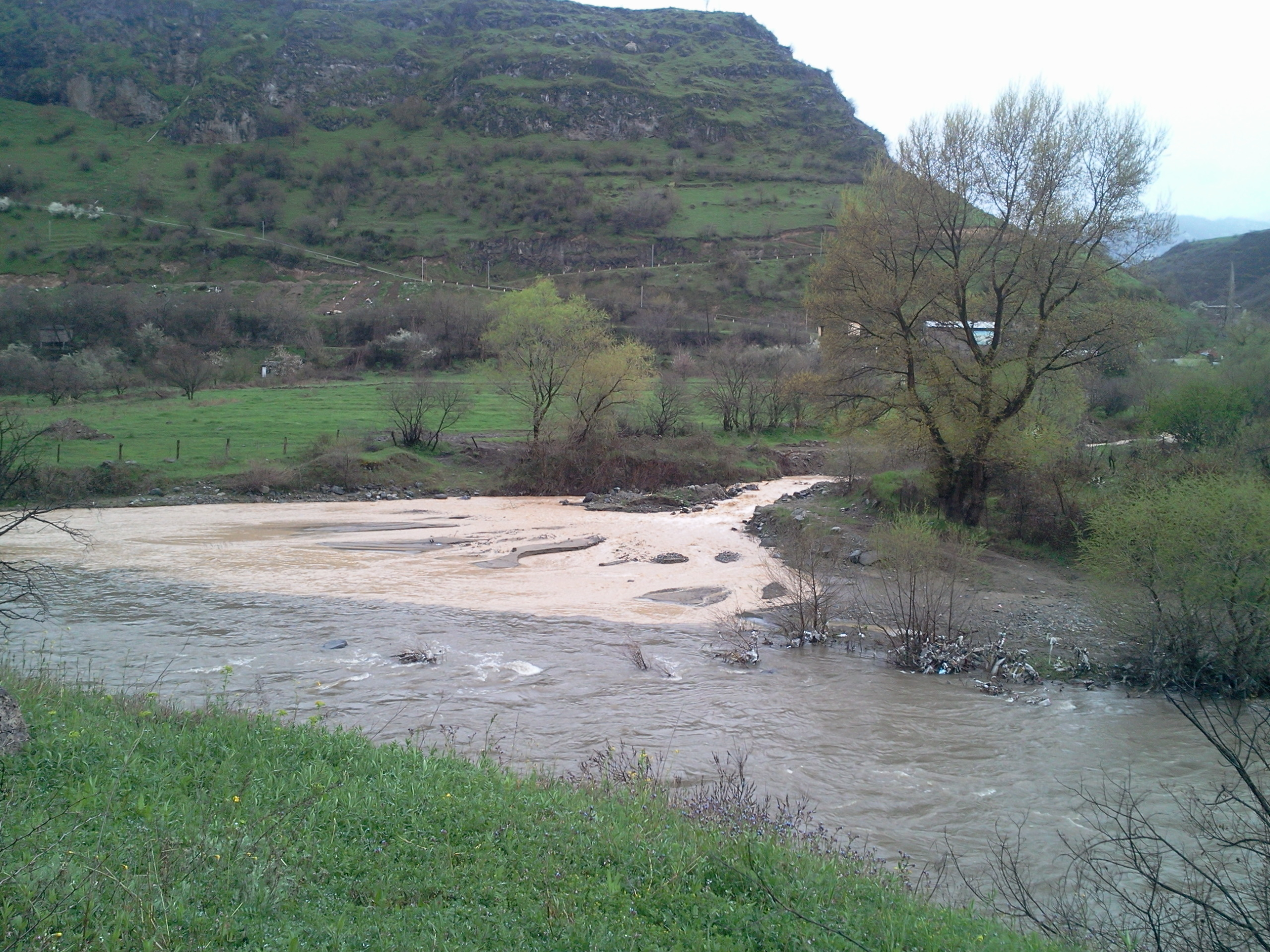
The Shnogh River, muddied by the mine, meets the Debed

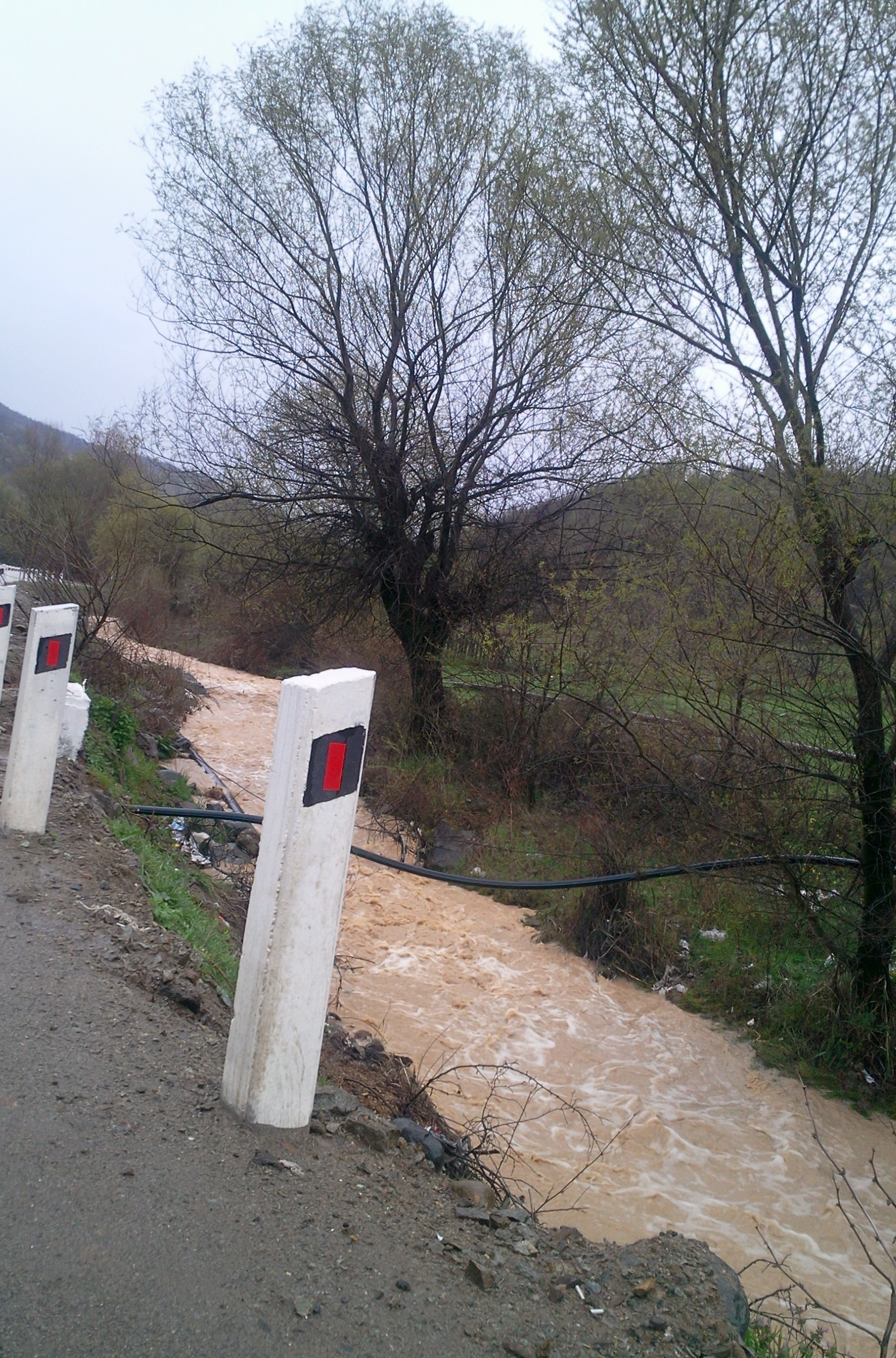
A muddied Shnogh River
2014

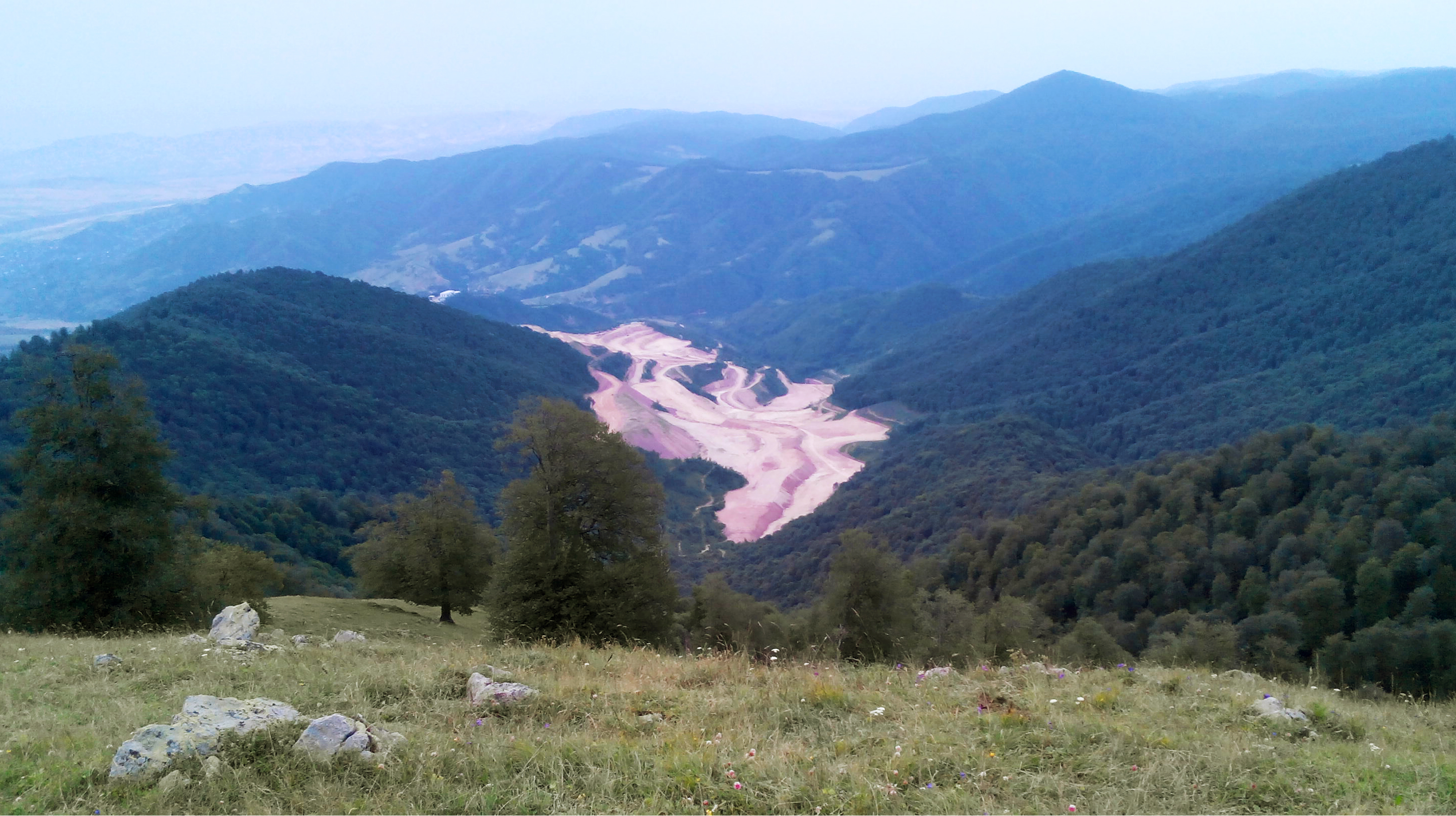
View of the open-pit from past the southern border of the mine
2013

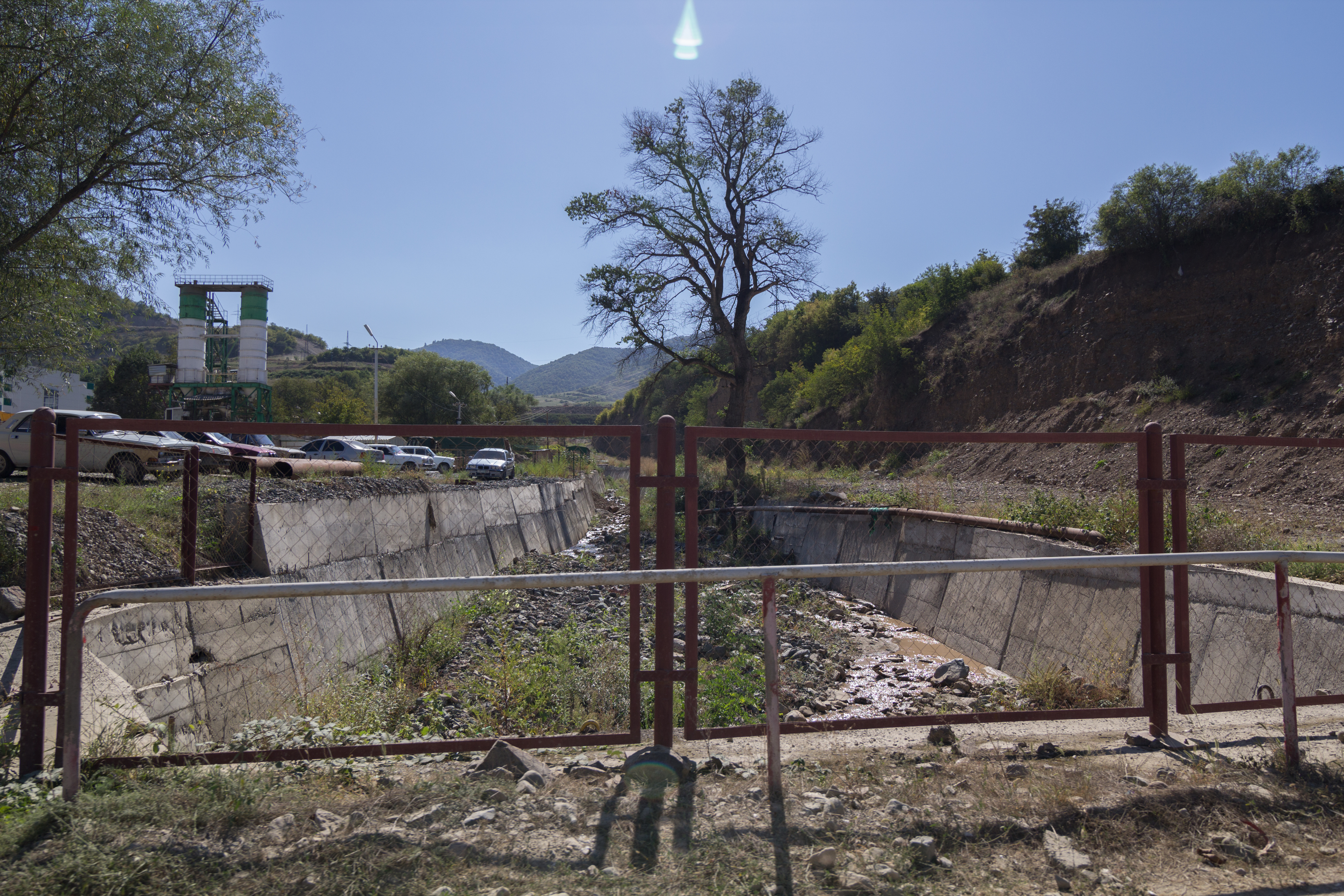
Stream next to main entrance with tailing dump in background

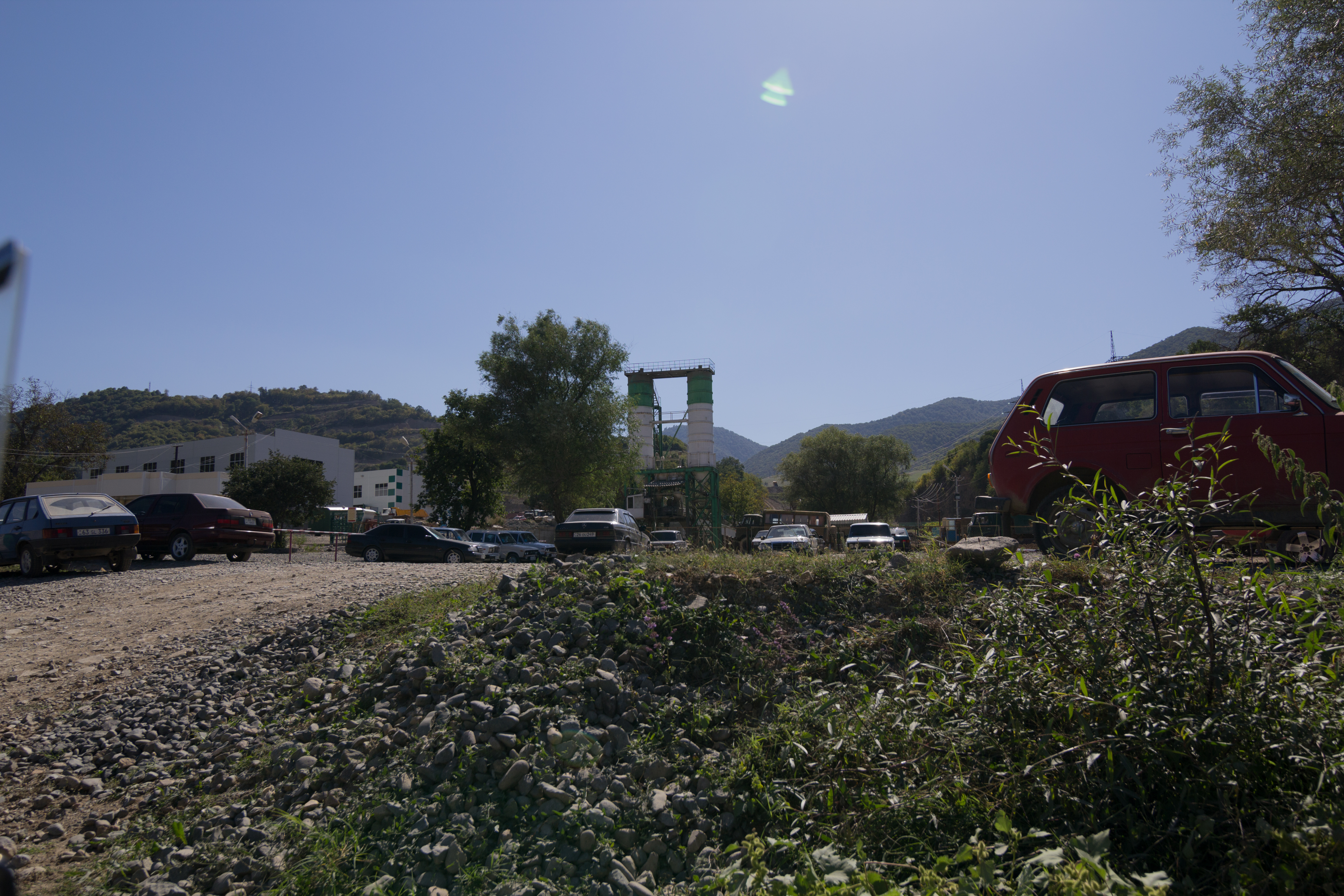
General view near administrative building

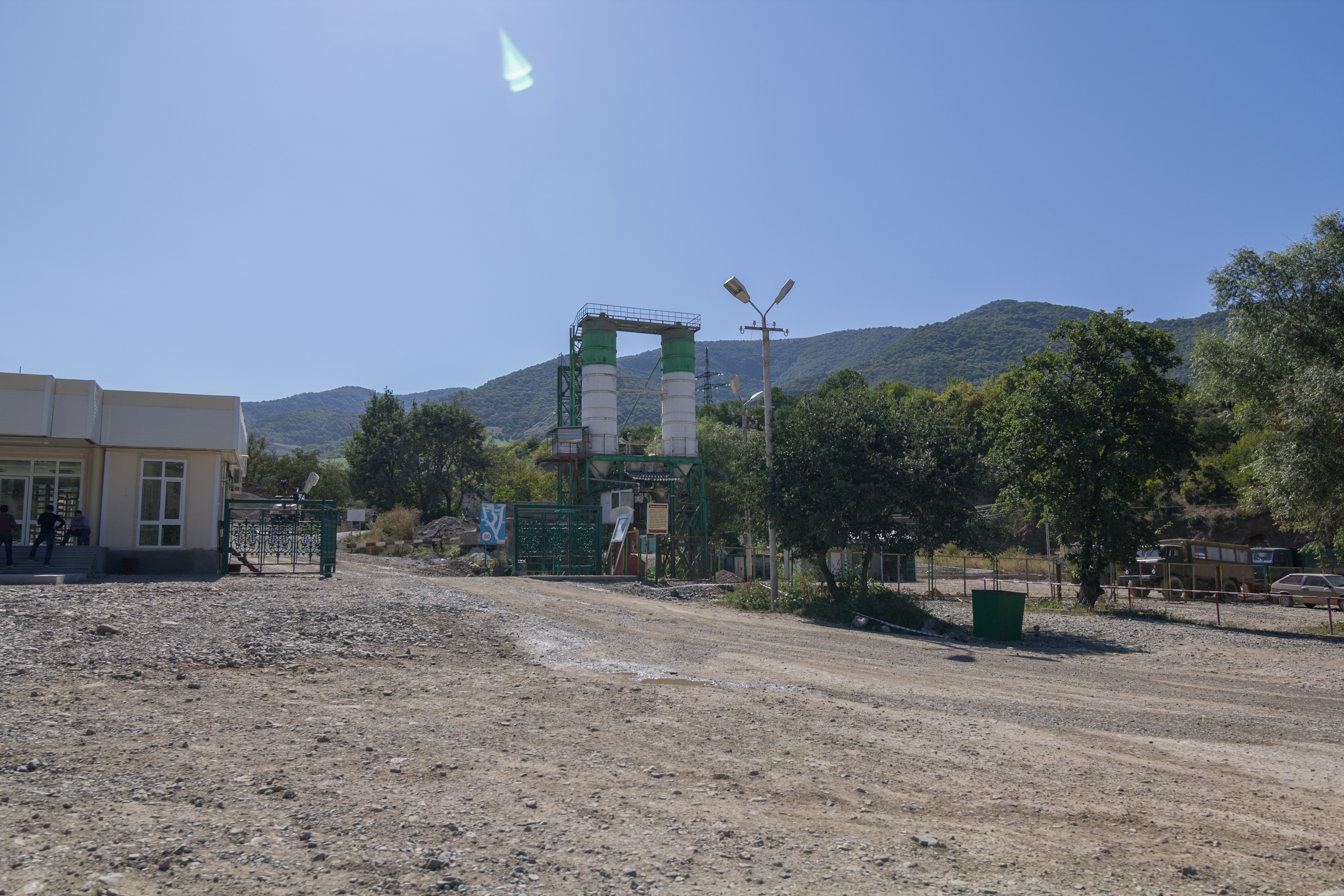
Main entrance

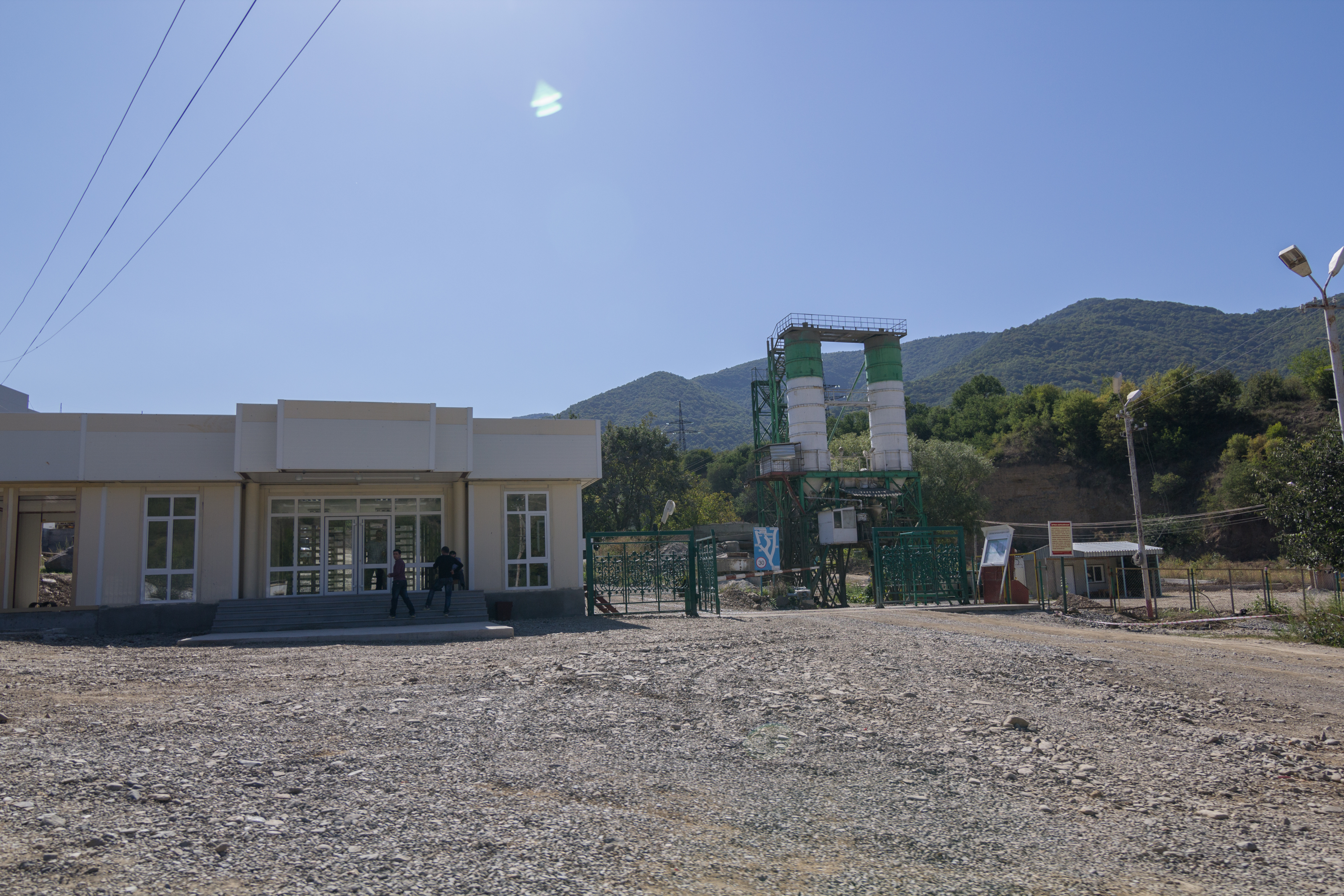
Main entrance security

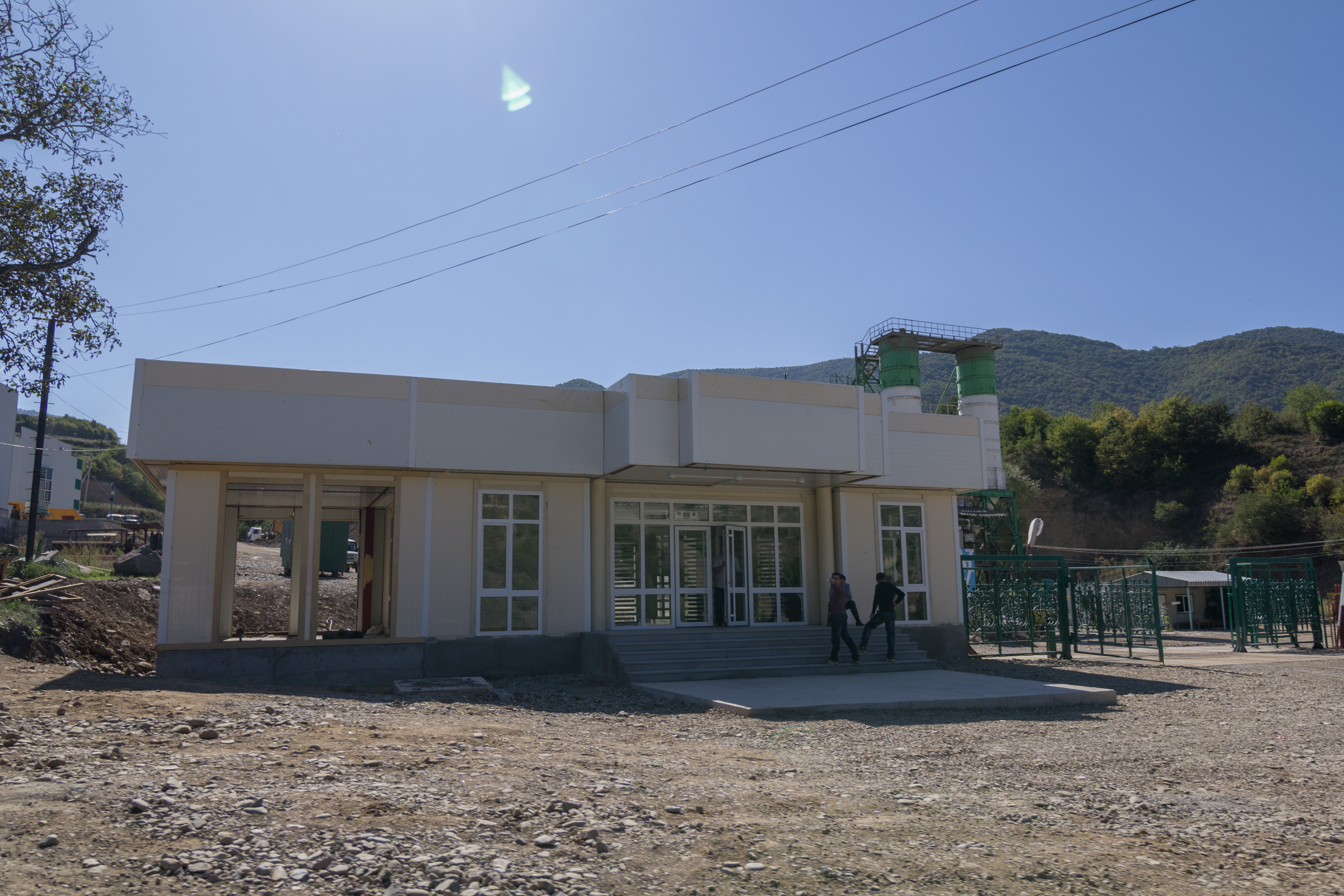
Security building at main entrance

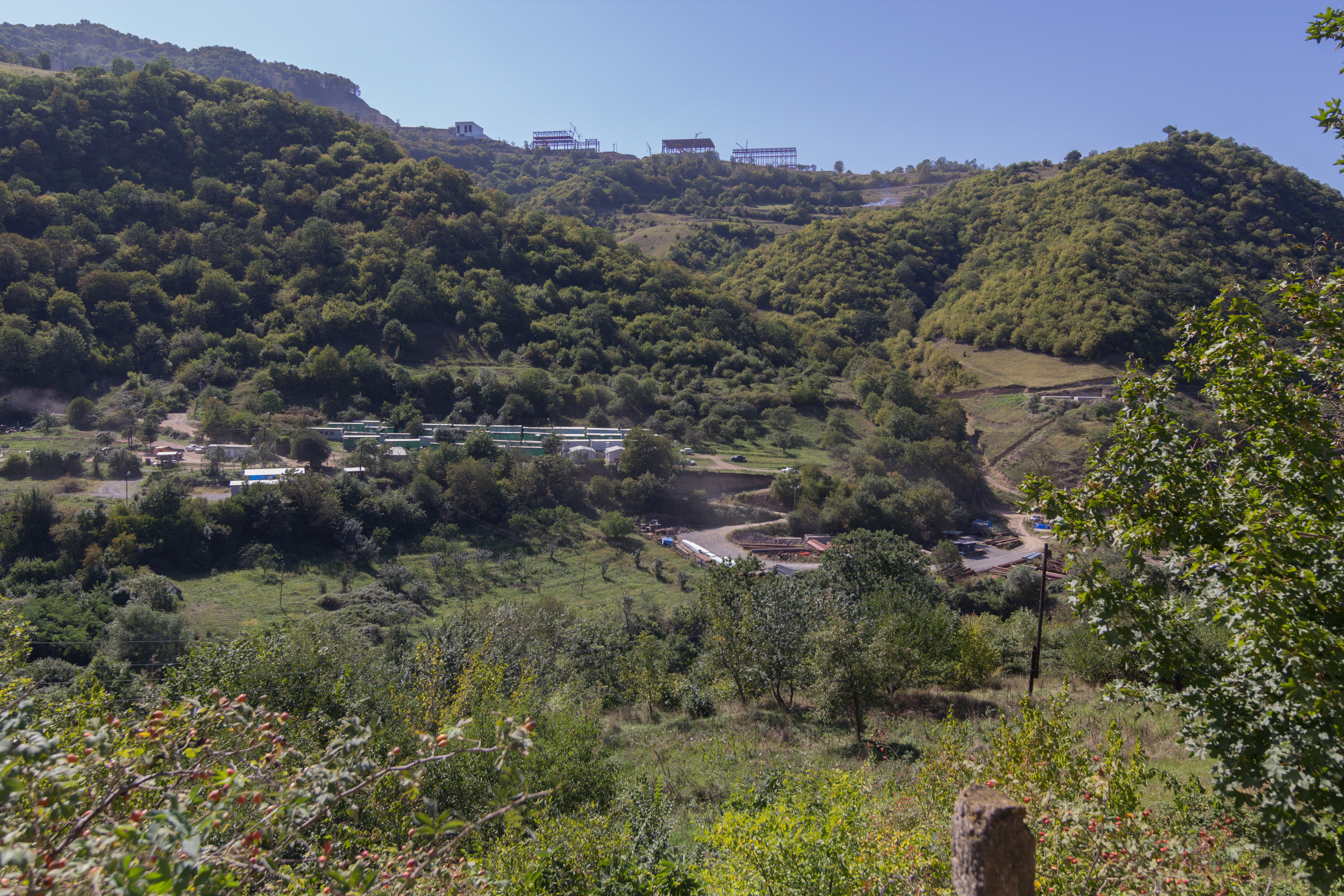
Ore processing facility under construction atop hill, behind which is the massive tailing dump

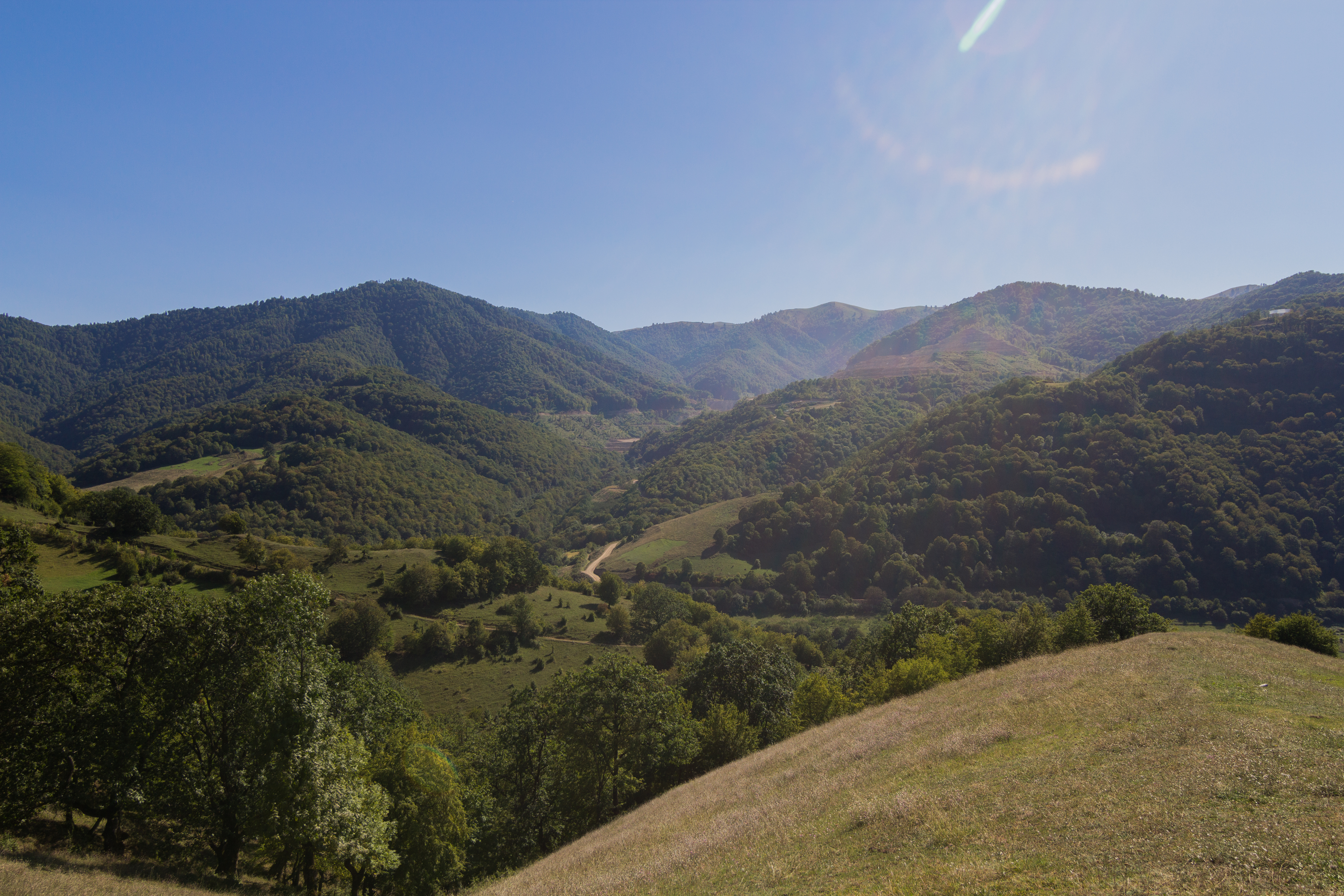
Open pit and eastern border of the mine property

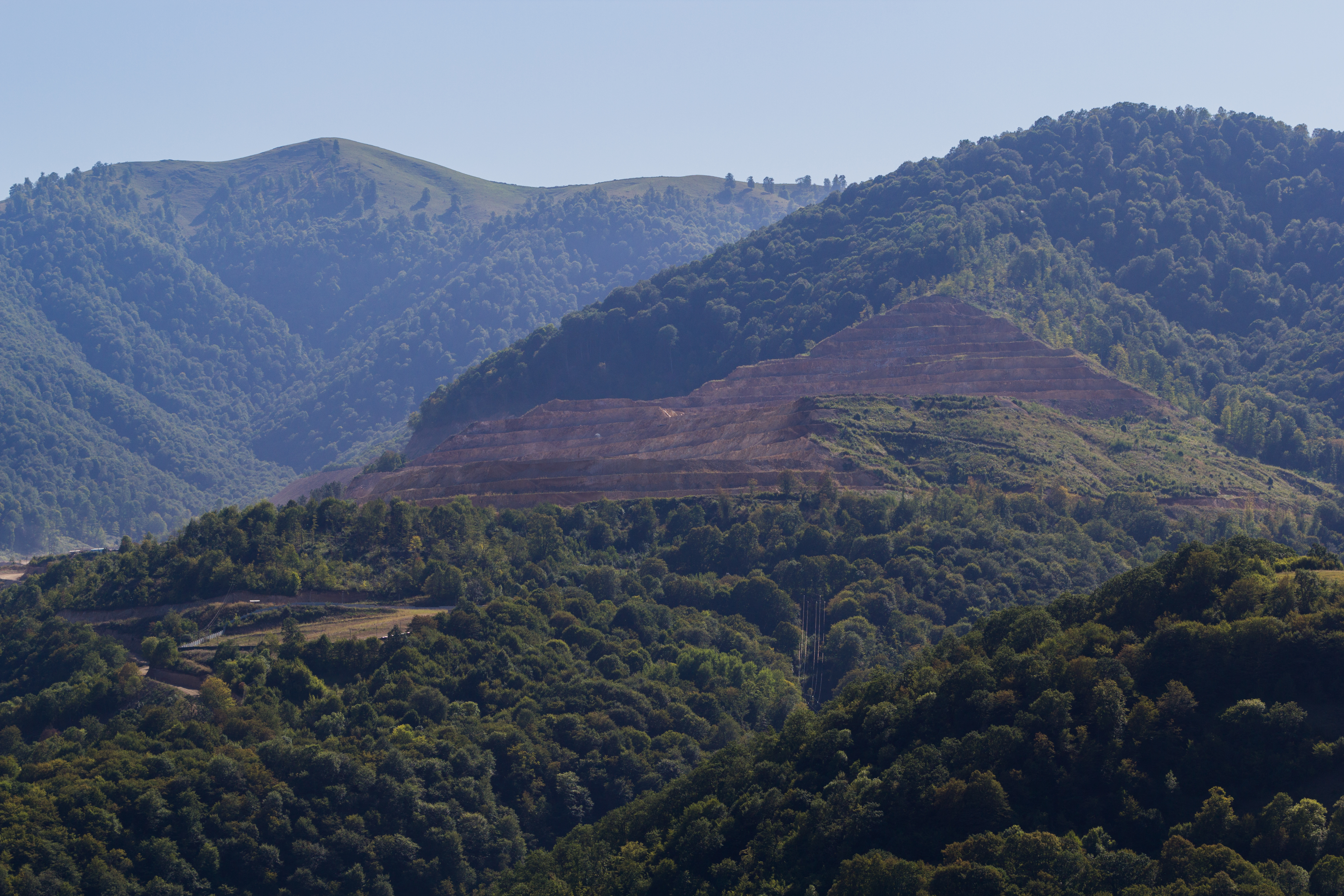
Location of open pit mine

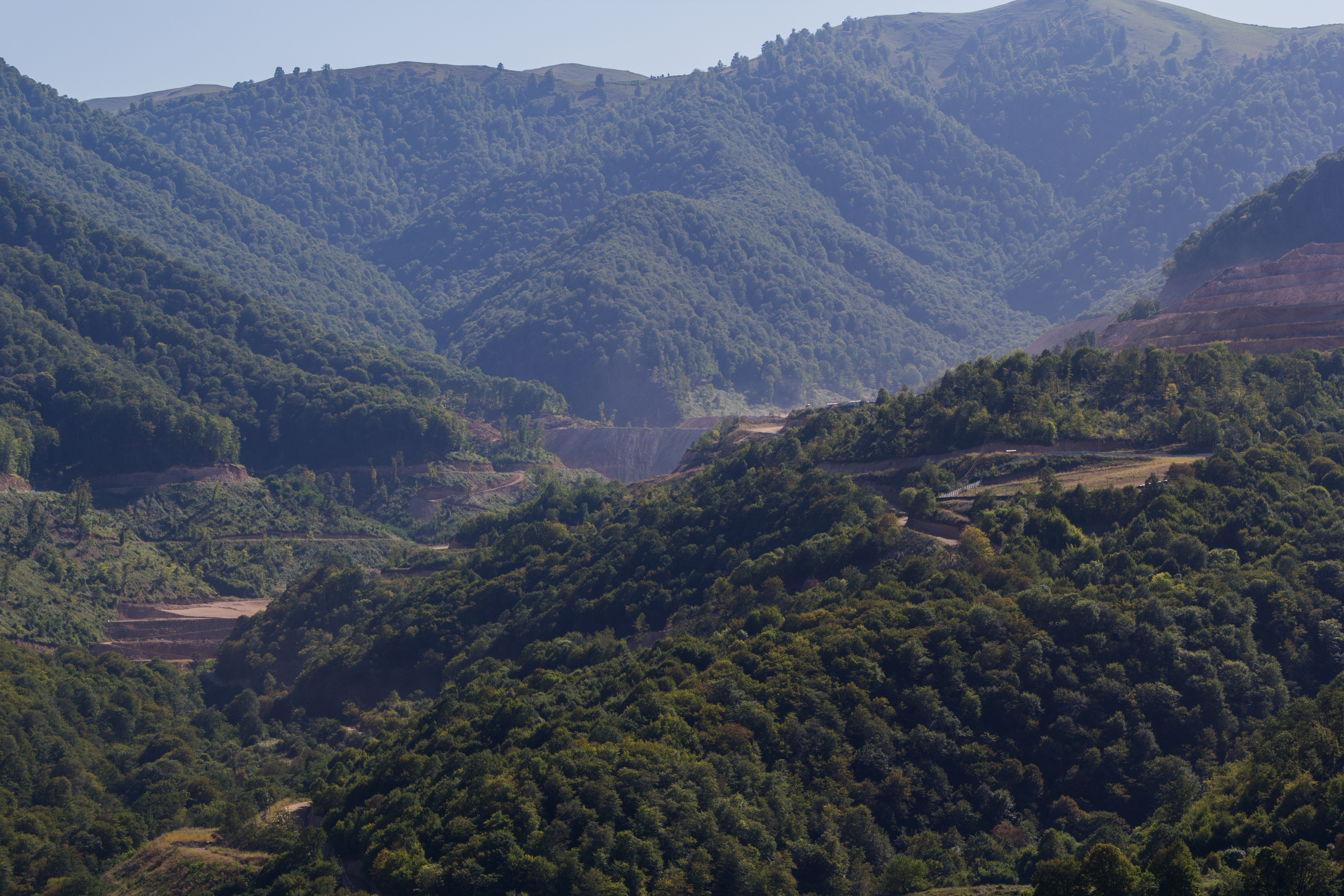
Location of open pit mine and waste rock storage

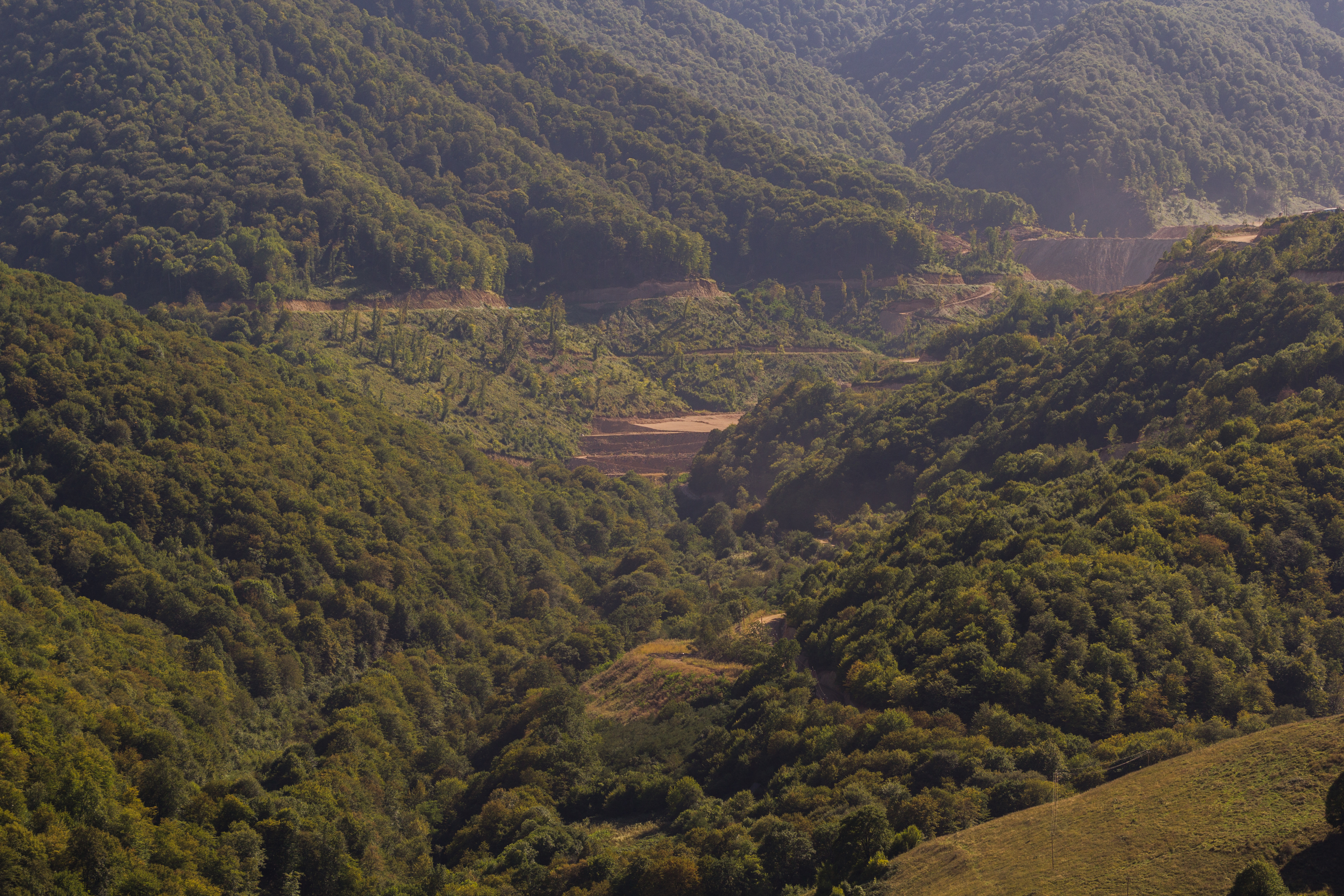
Waste rock storage area

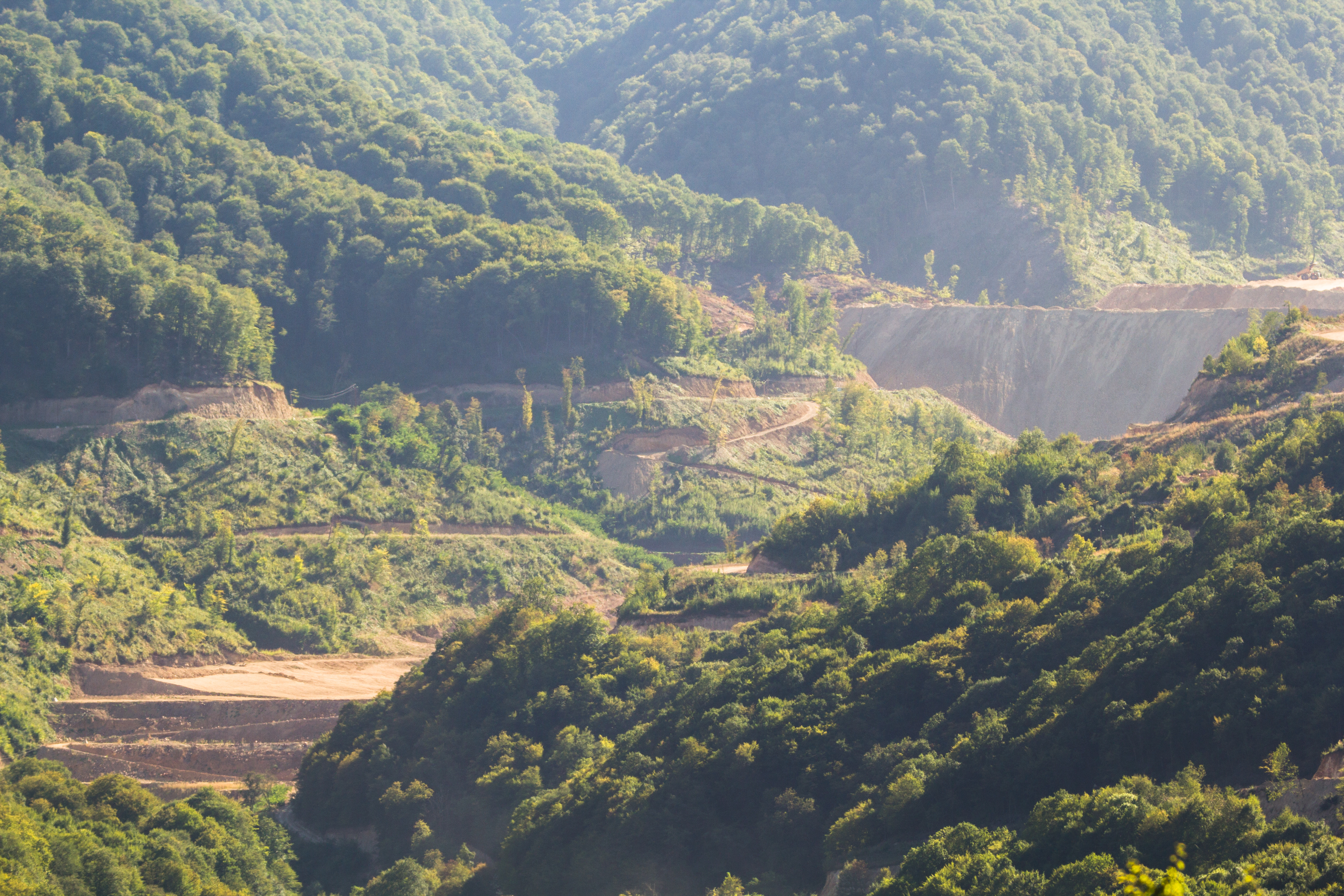
Closeup of waste rock storage area

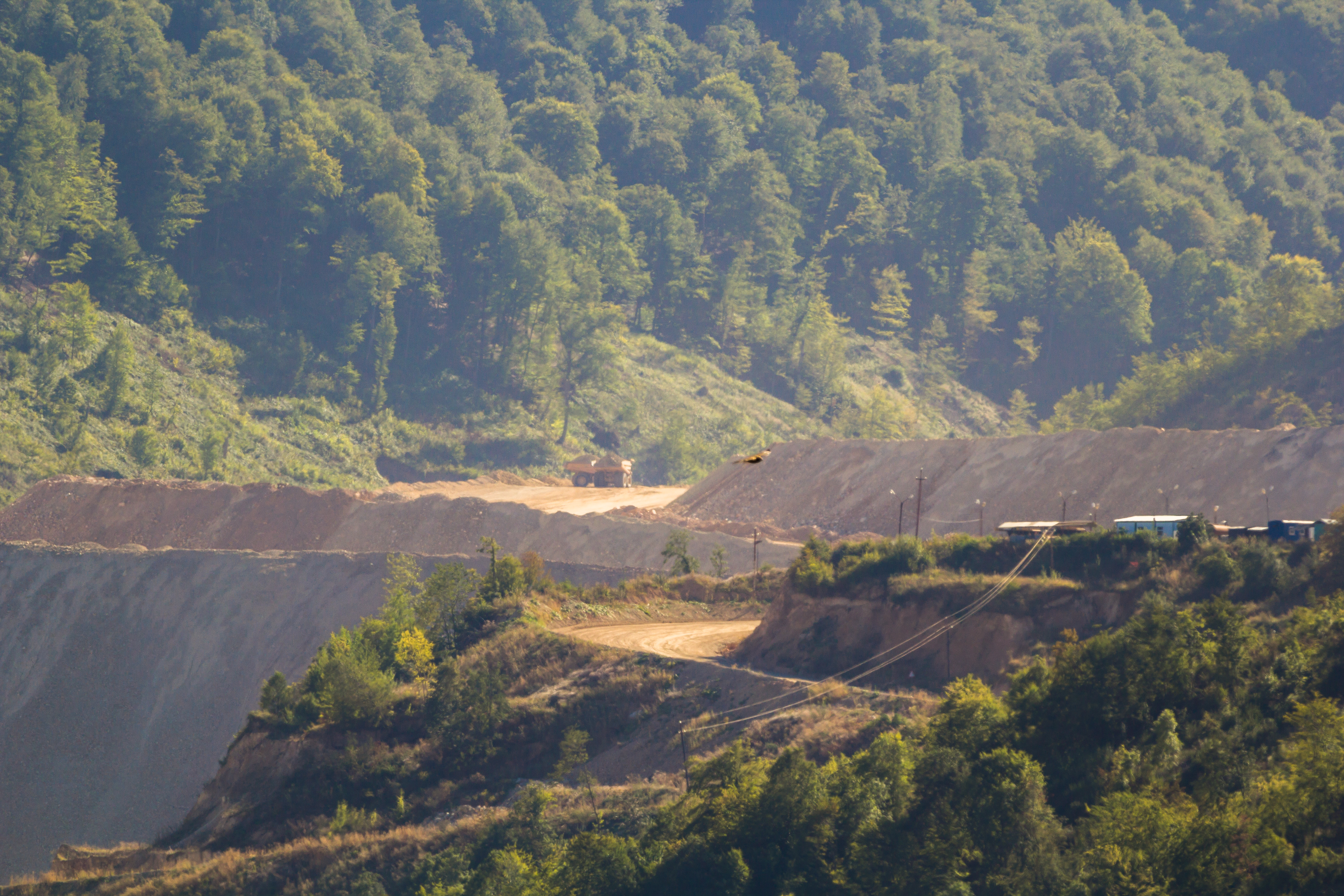
Closeup of upper rock storage area

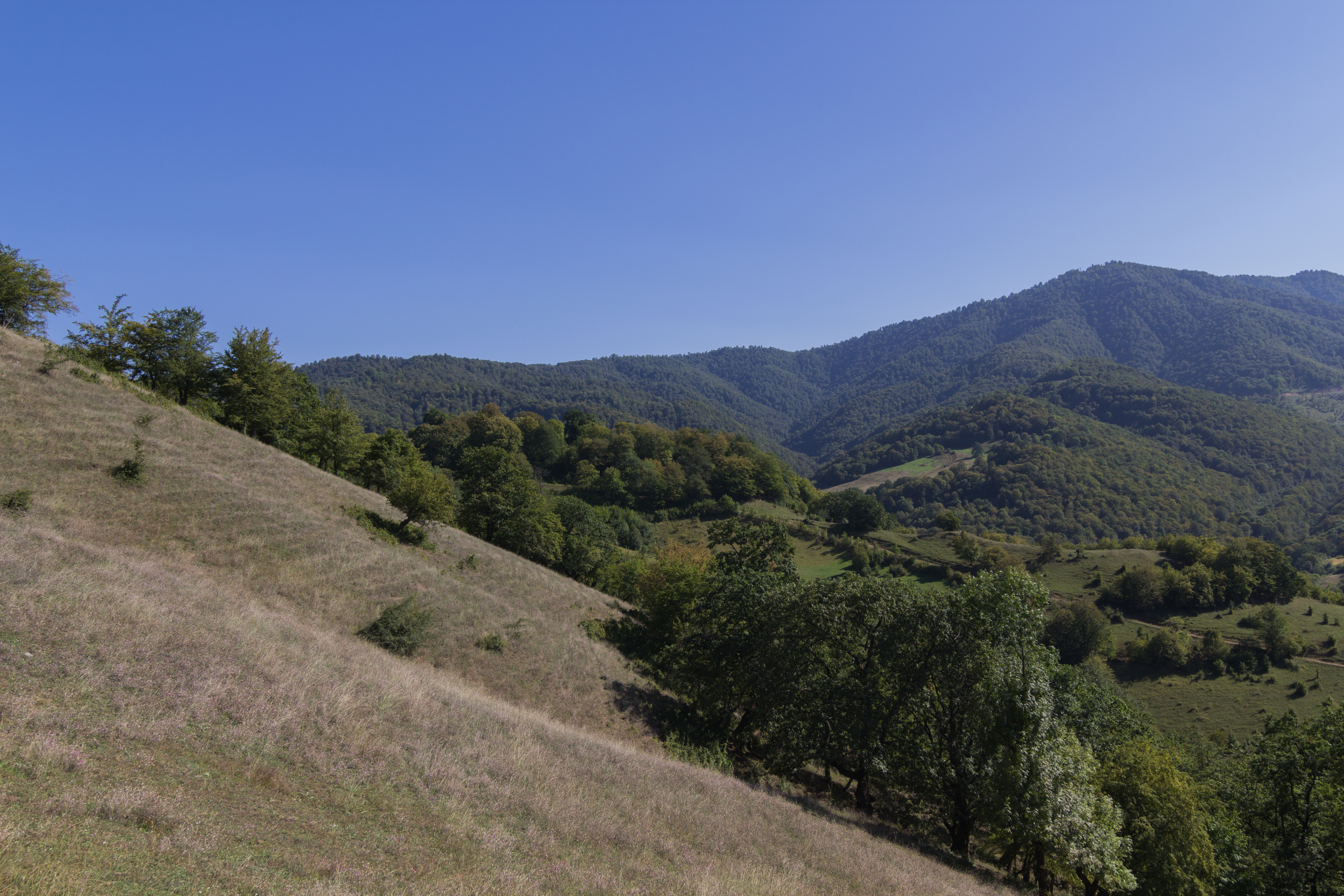
Eastern boundary and explosives storage area

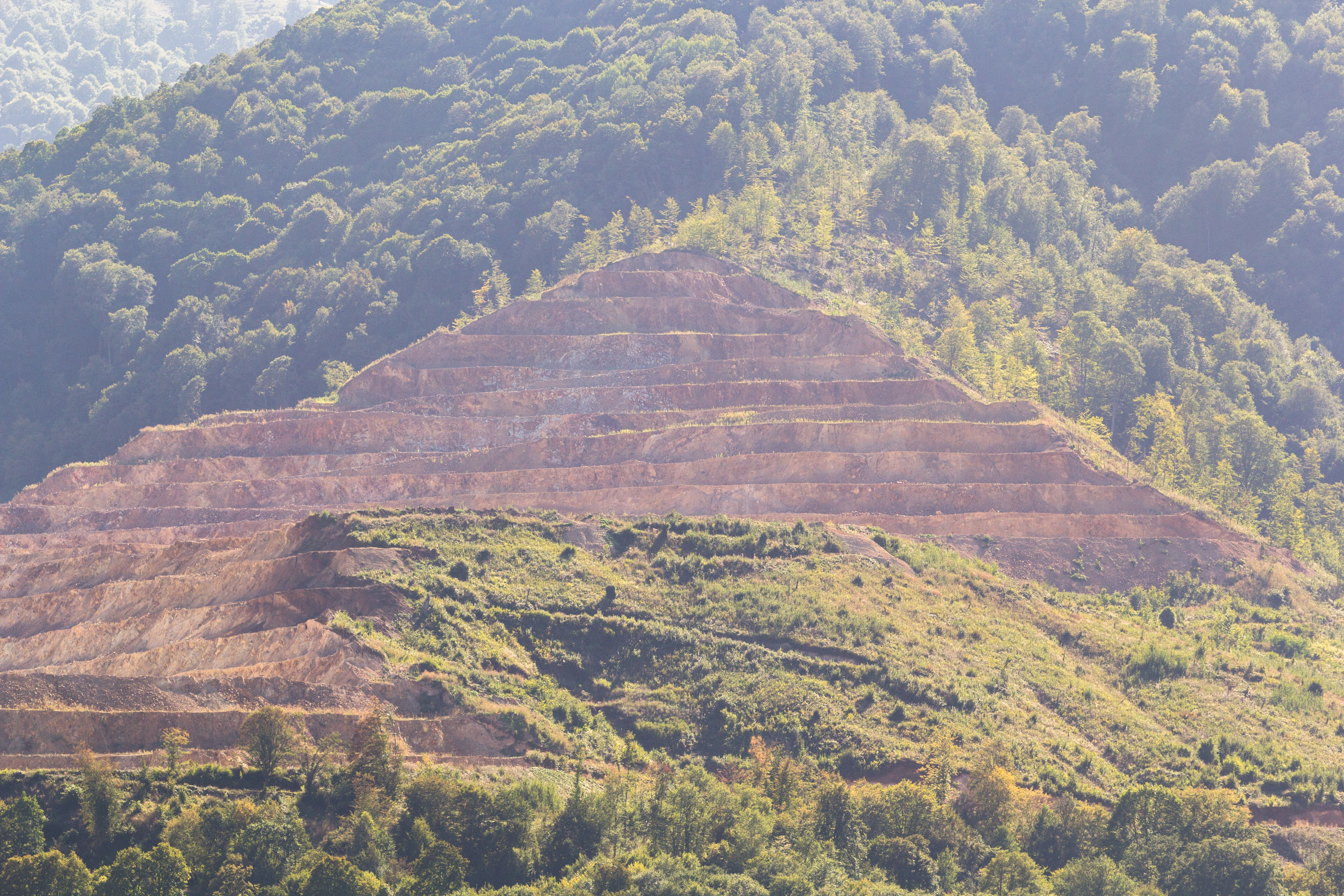
Closeup of open pit

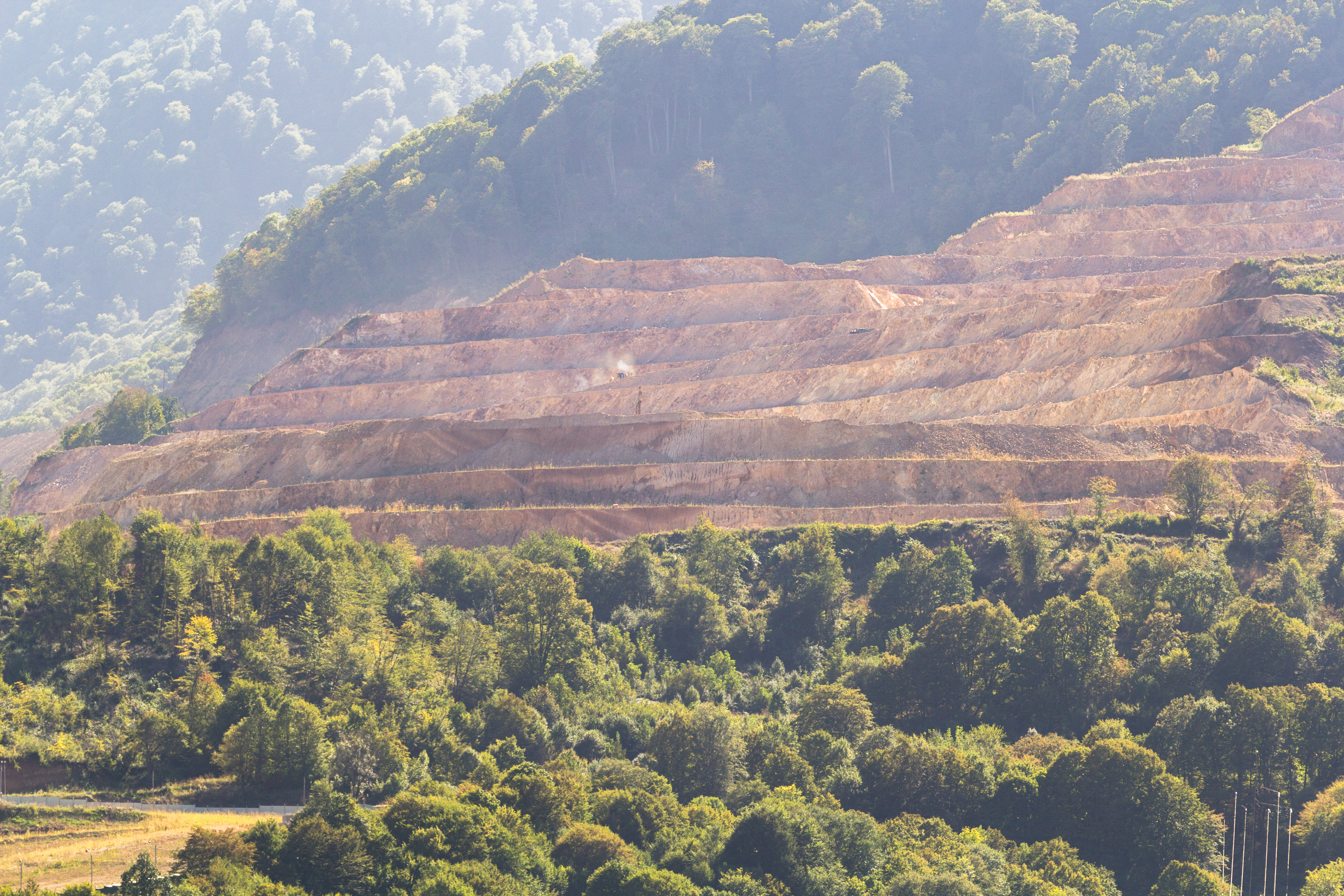
Open pit

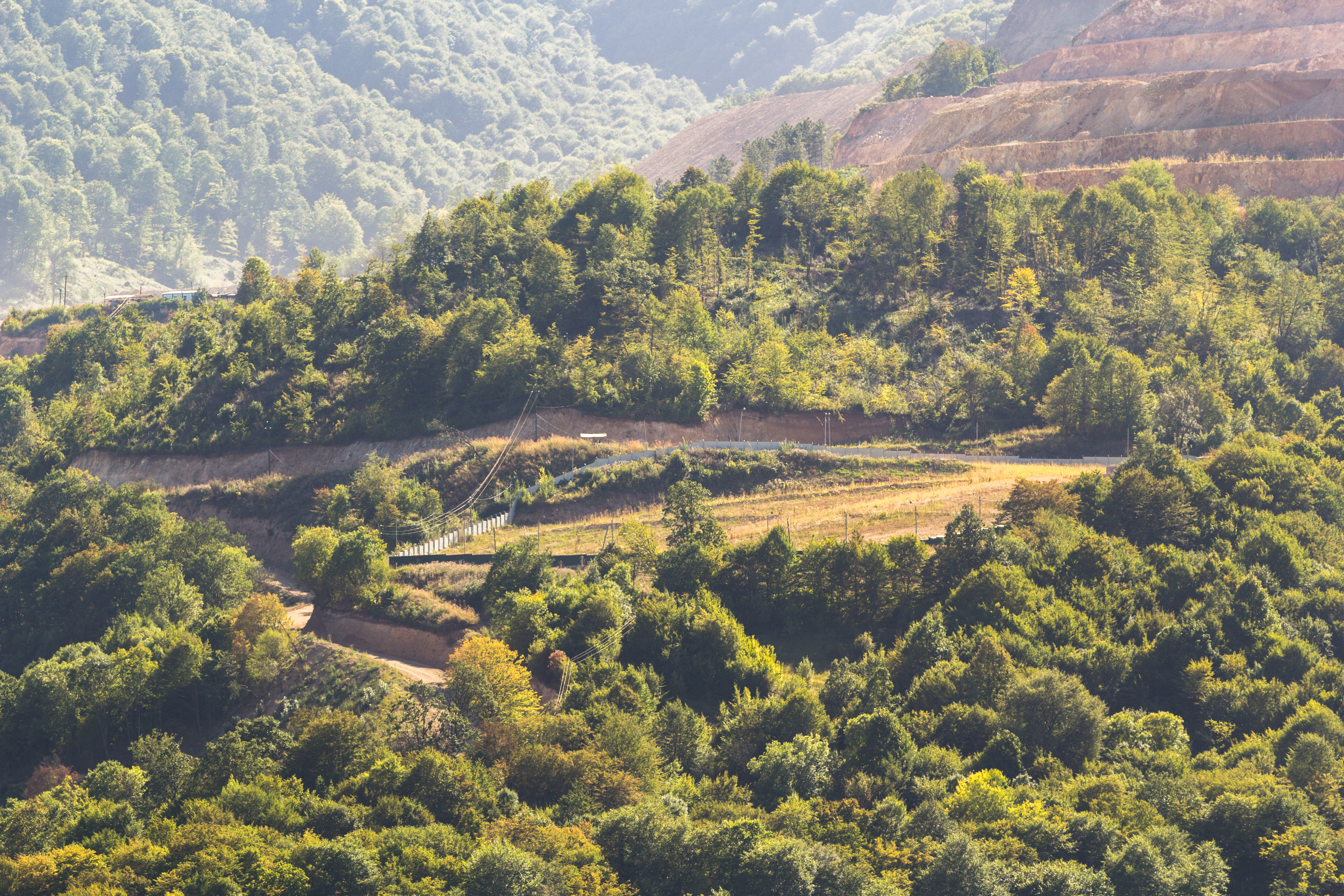
Open pit

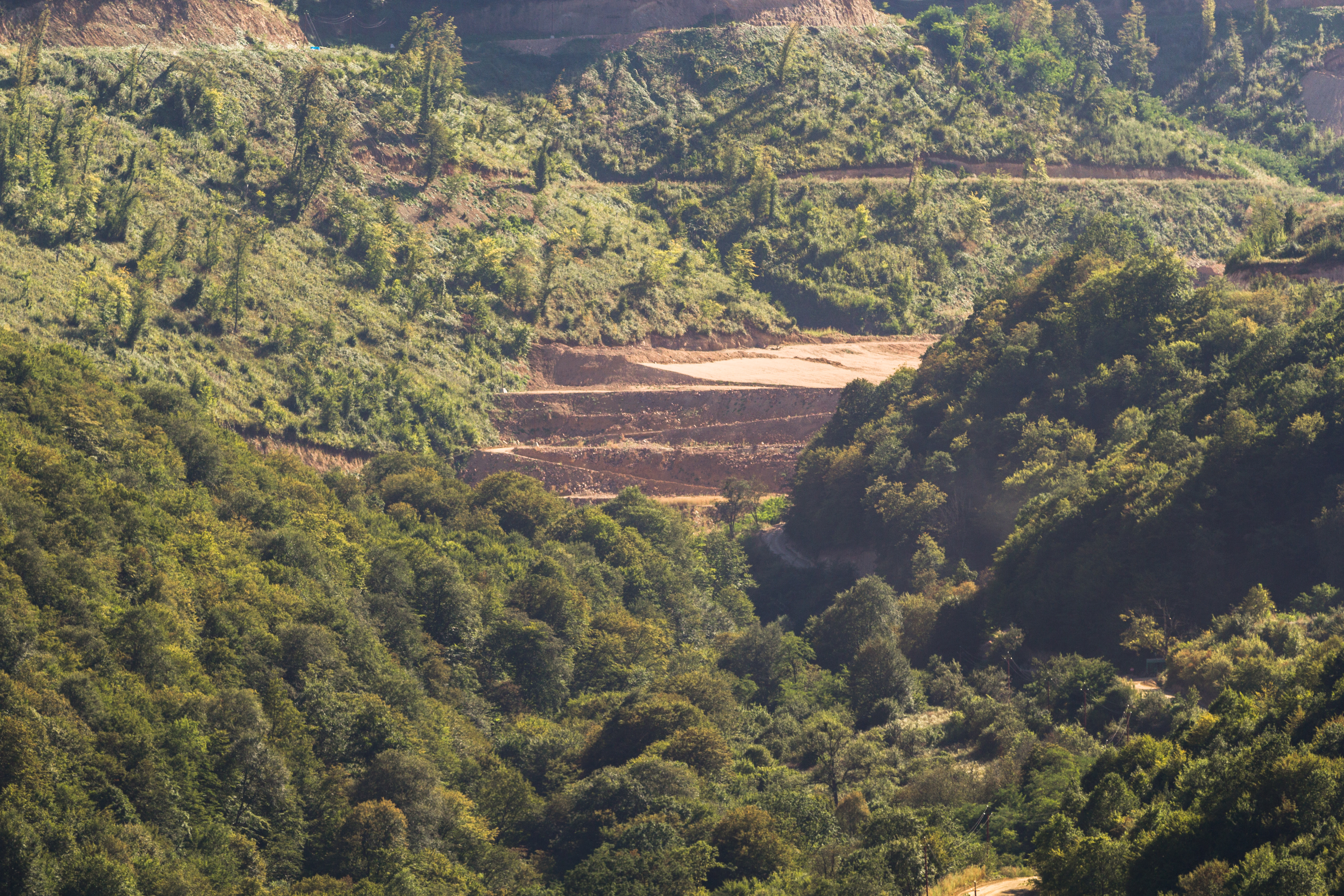
Closeup of lower waste rock storage area

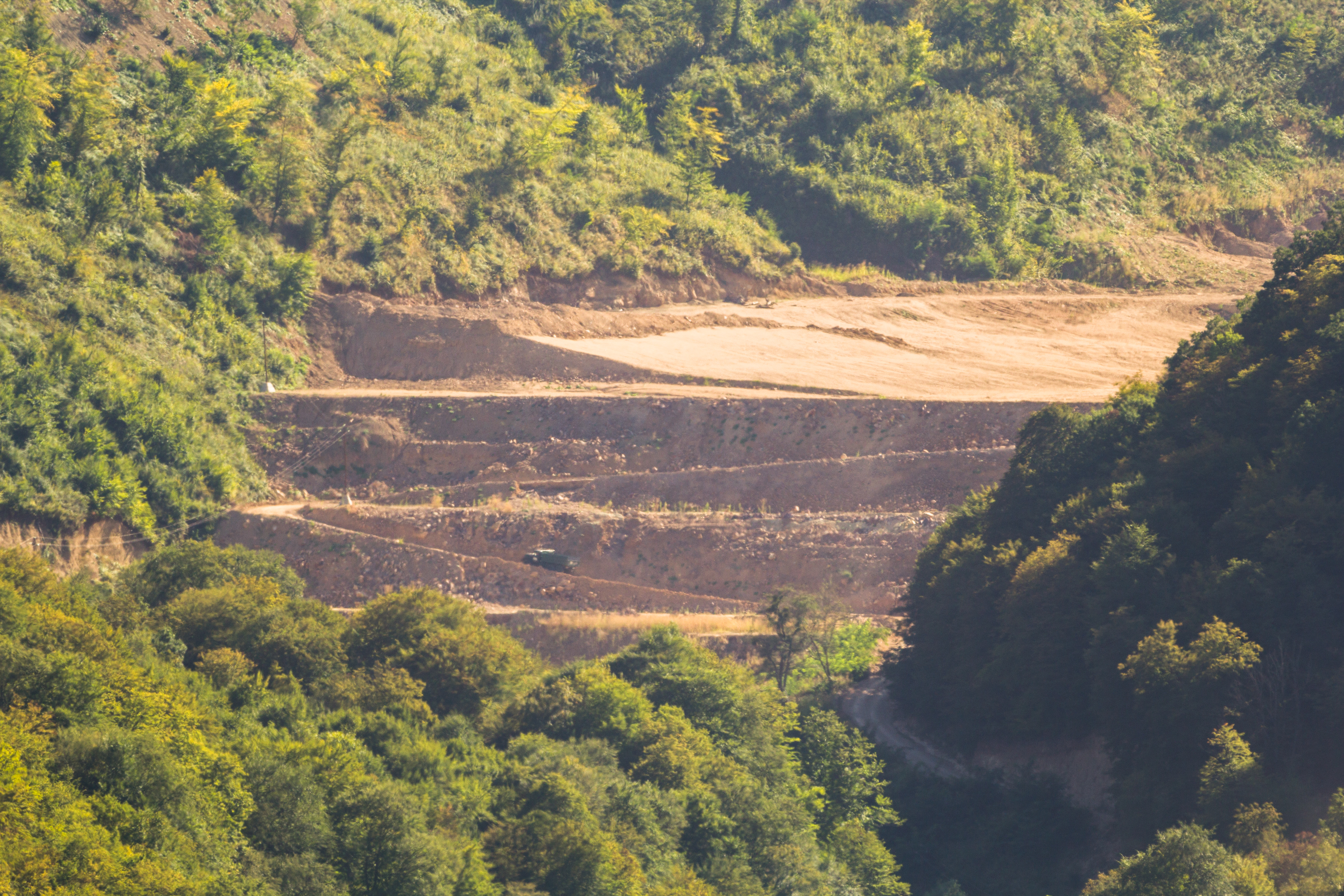
Super closeup of lower waste rock storage area

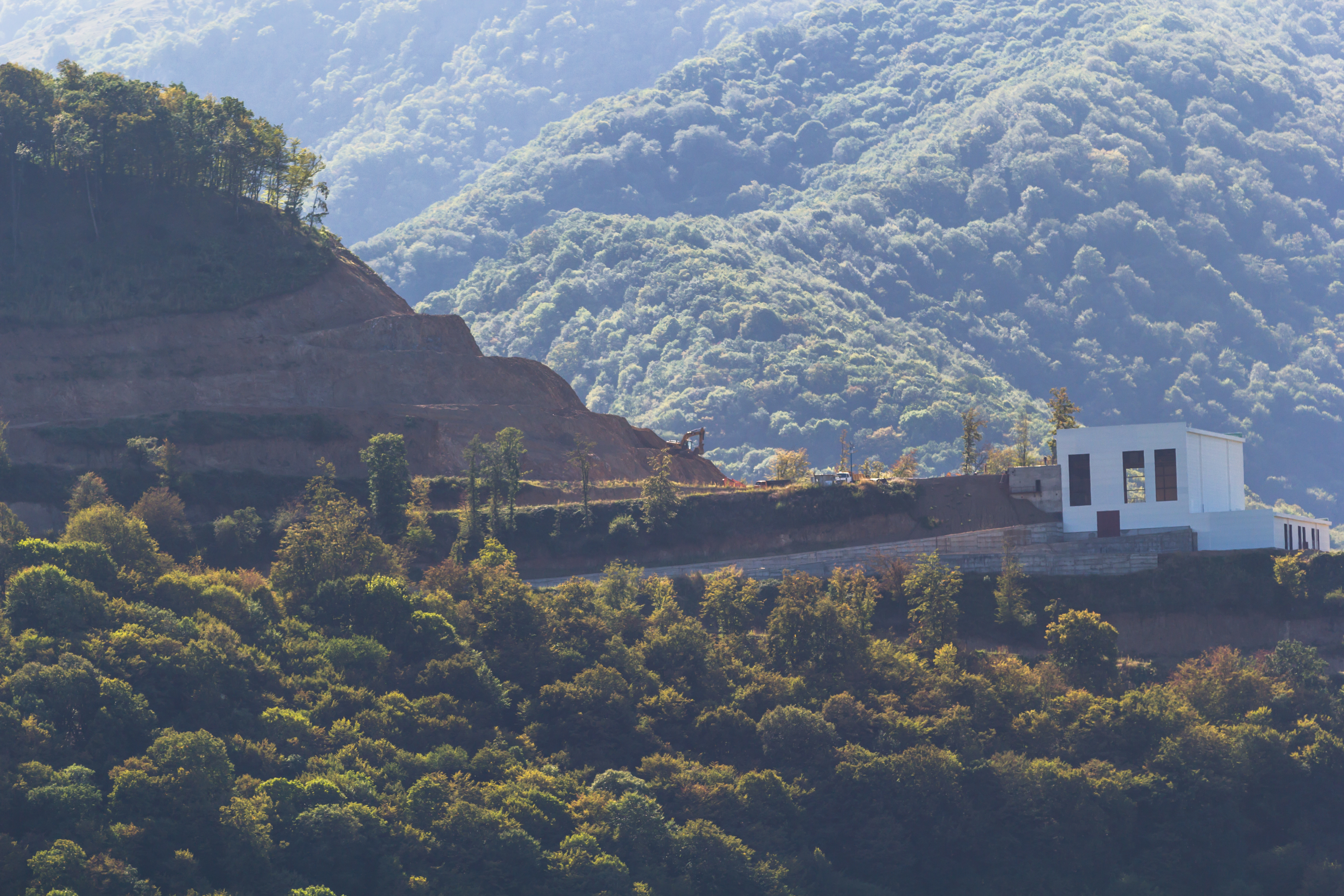
Raw ore receiving facility

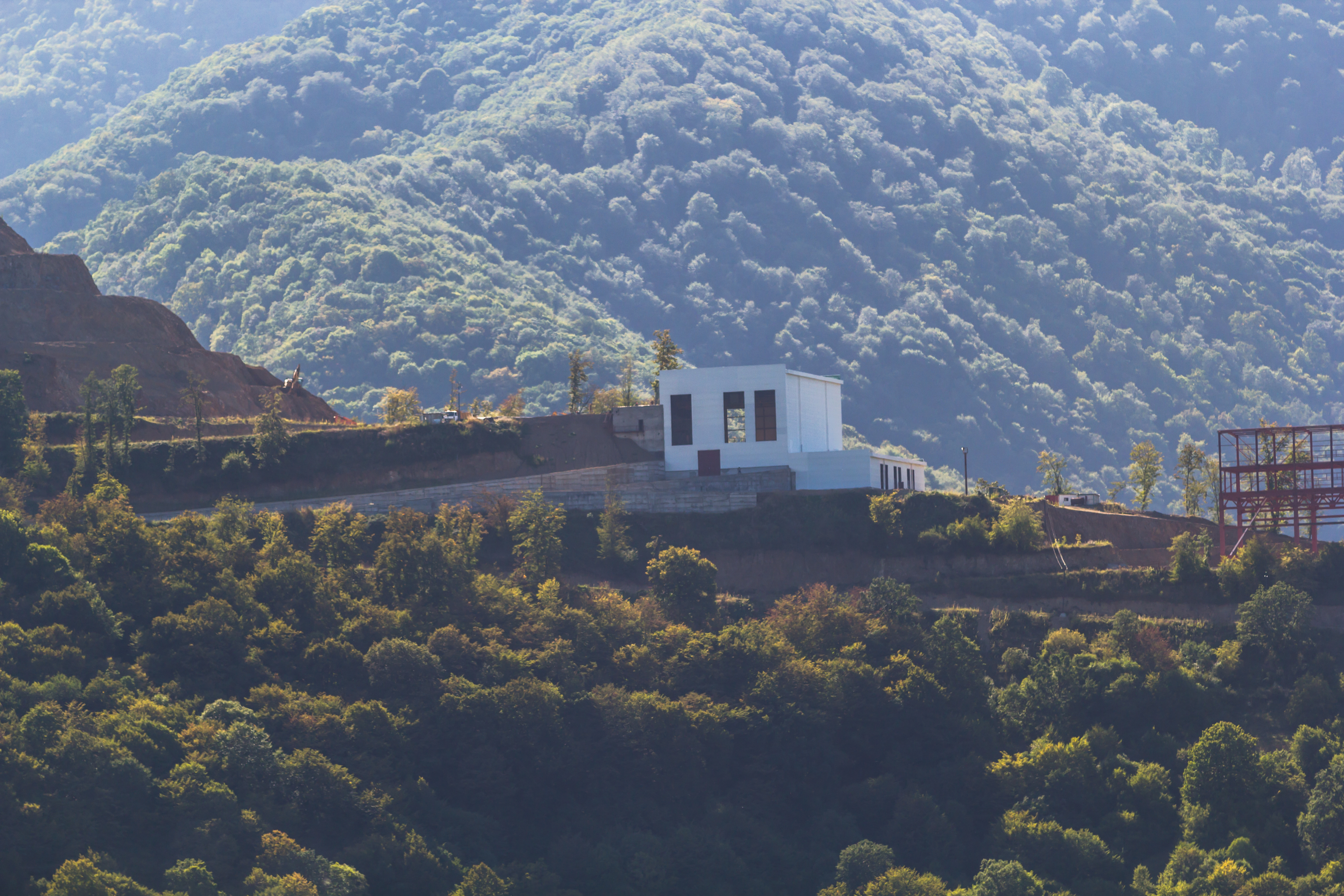
Raw ore receiving facility

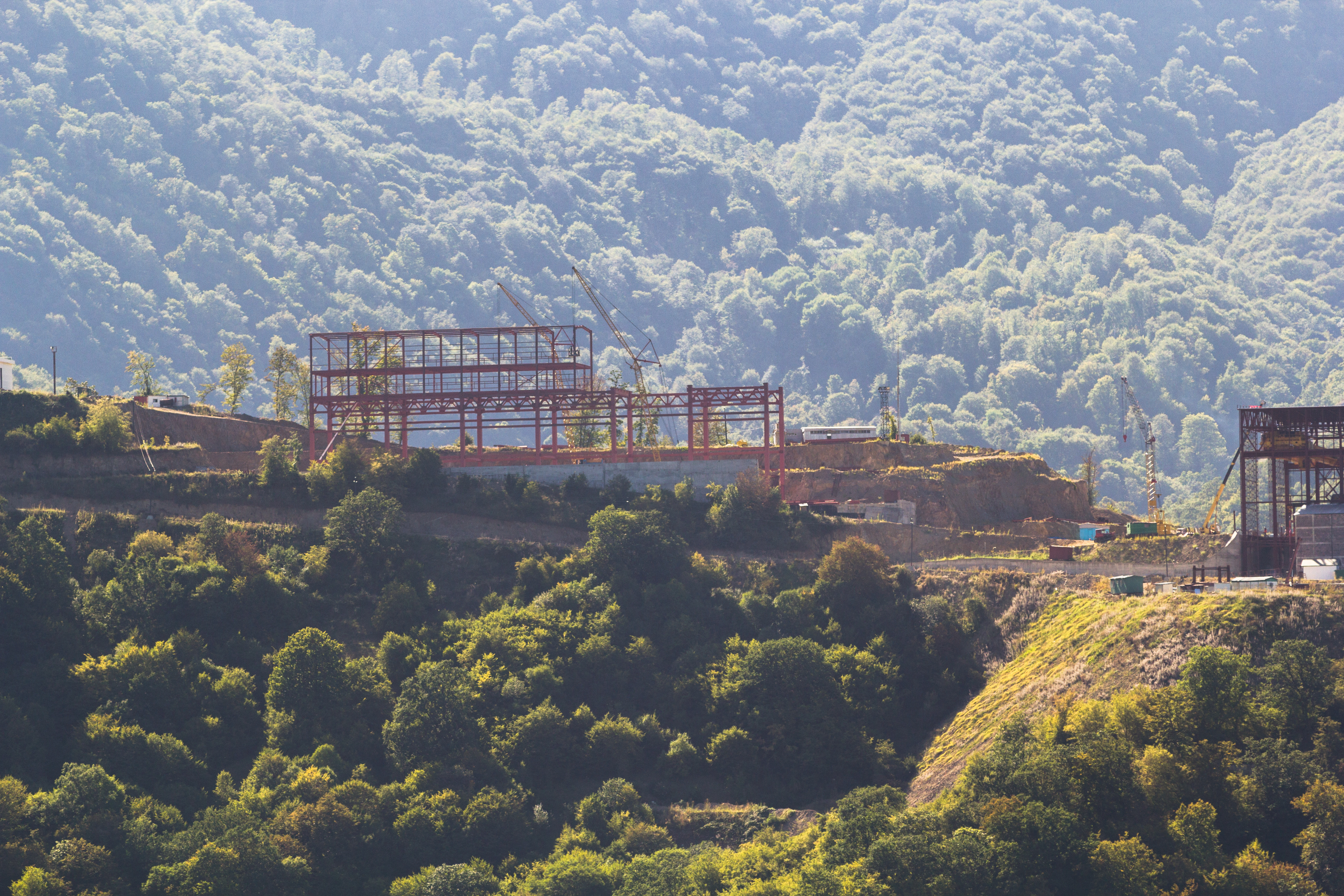
Building 1 of ore processing facility

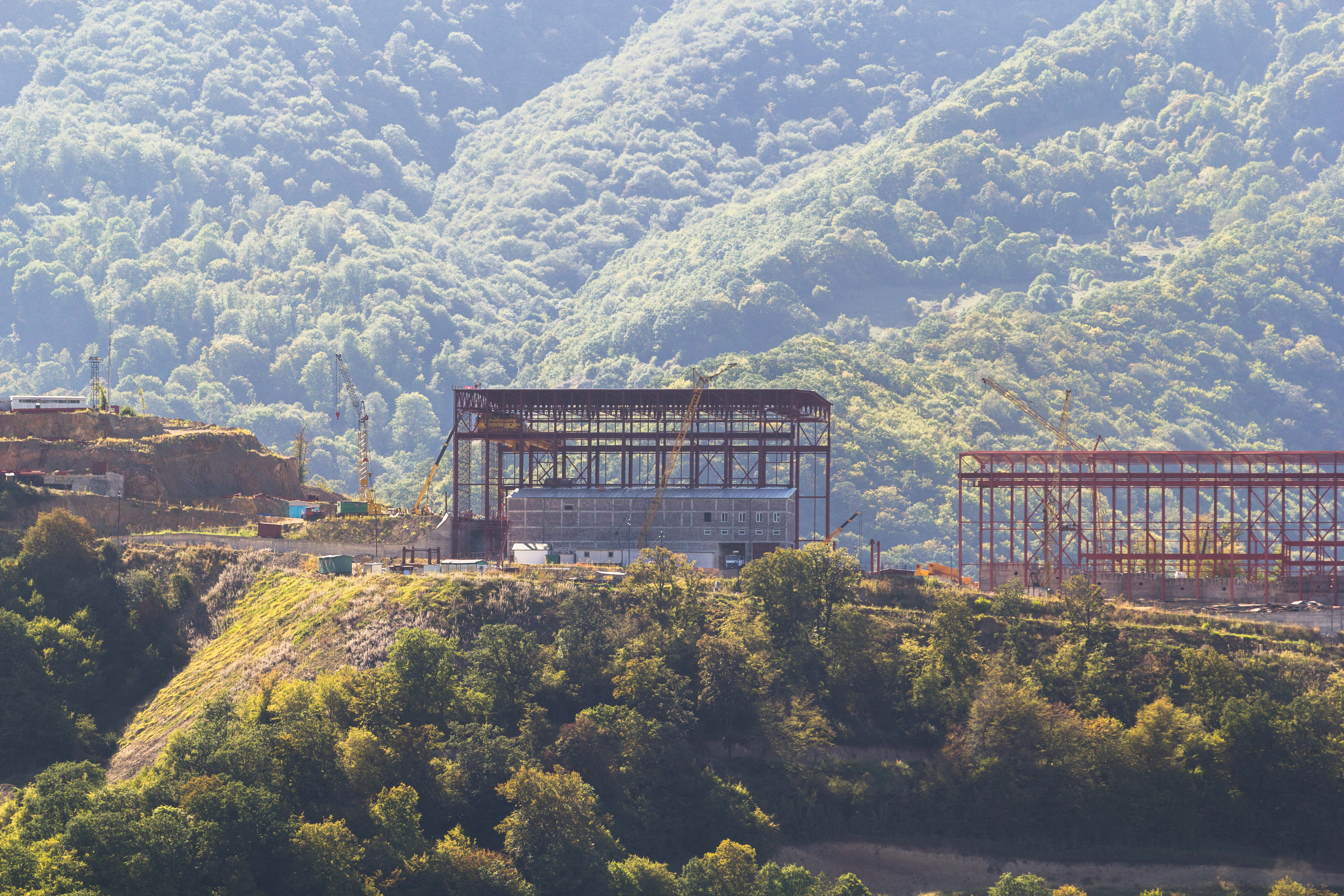
Building 2 of ore processing facility

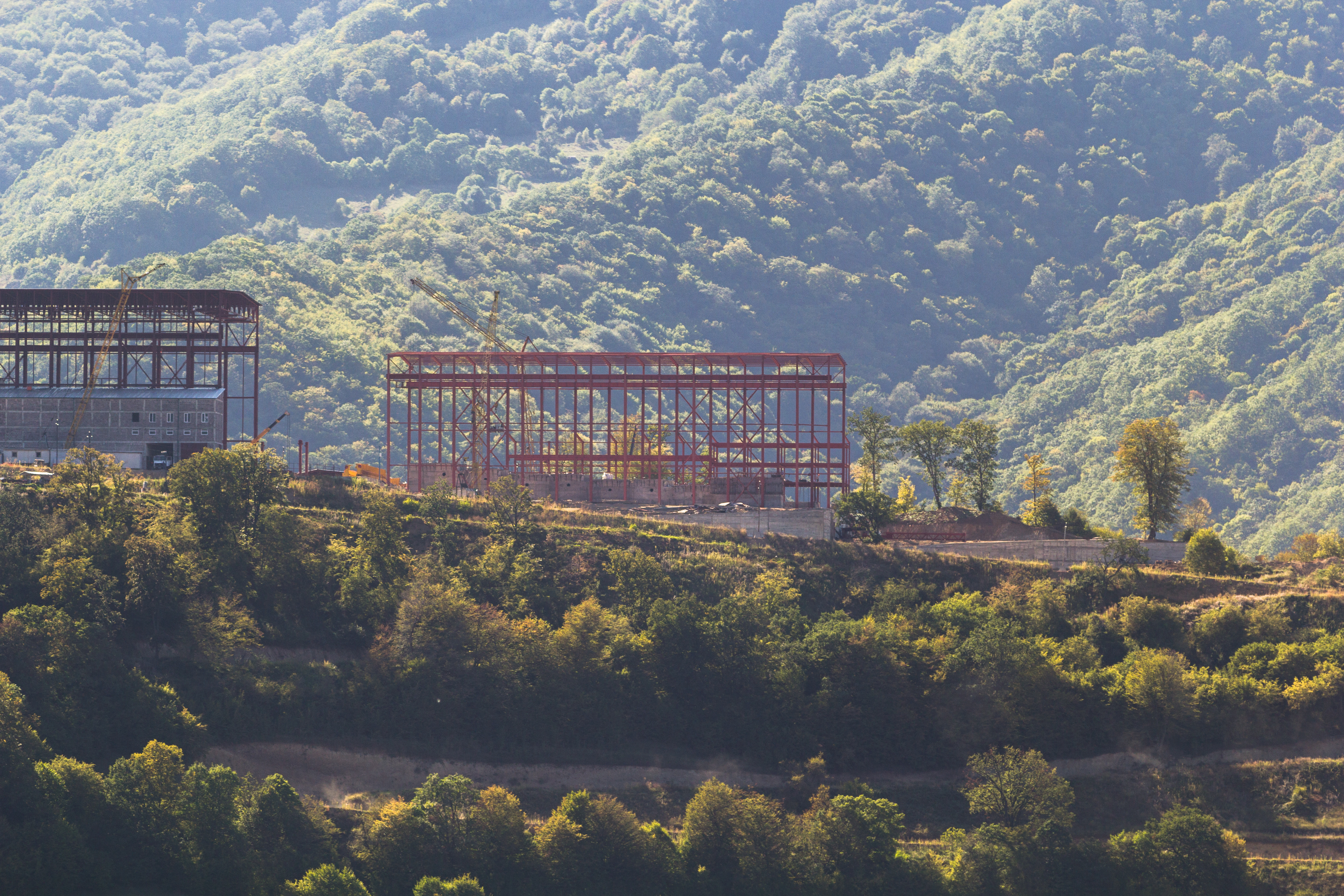
Building 3 of ore processing facility
2012

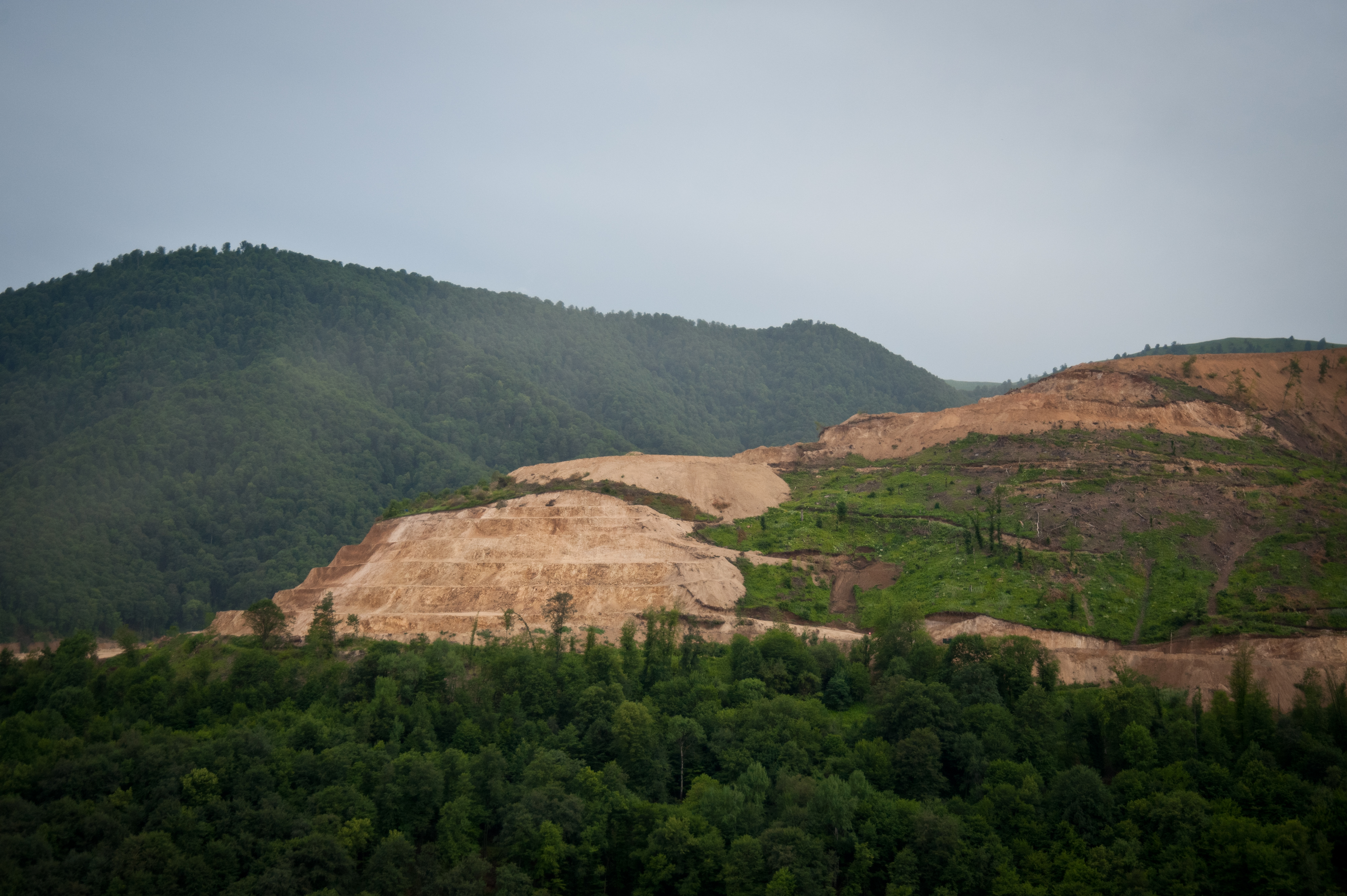
Destruction of the old-growth forest at Teghut in summer 2012

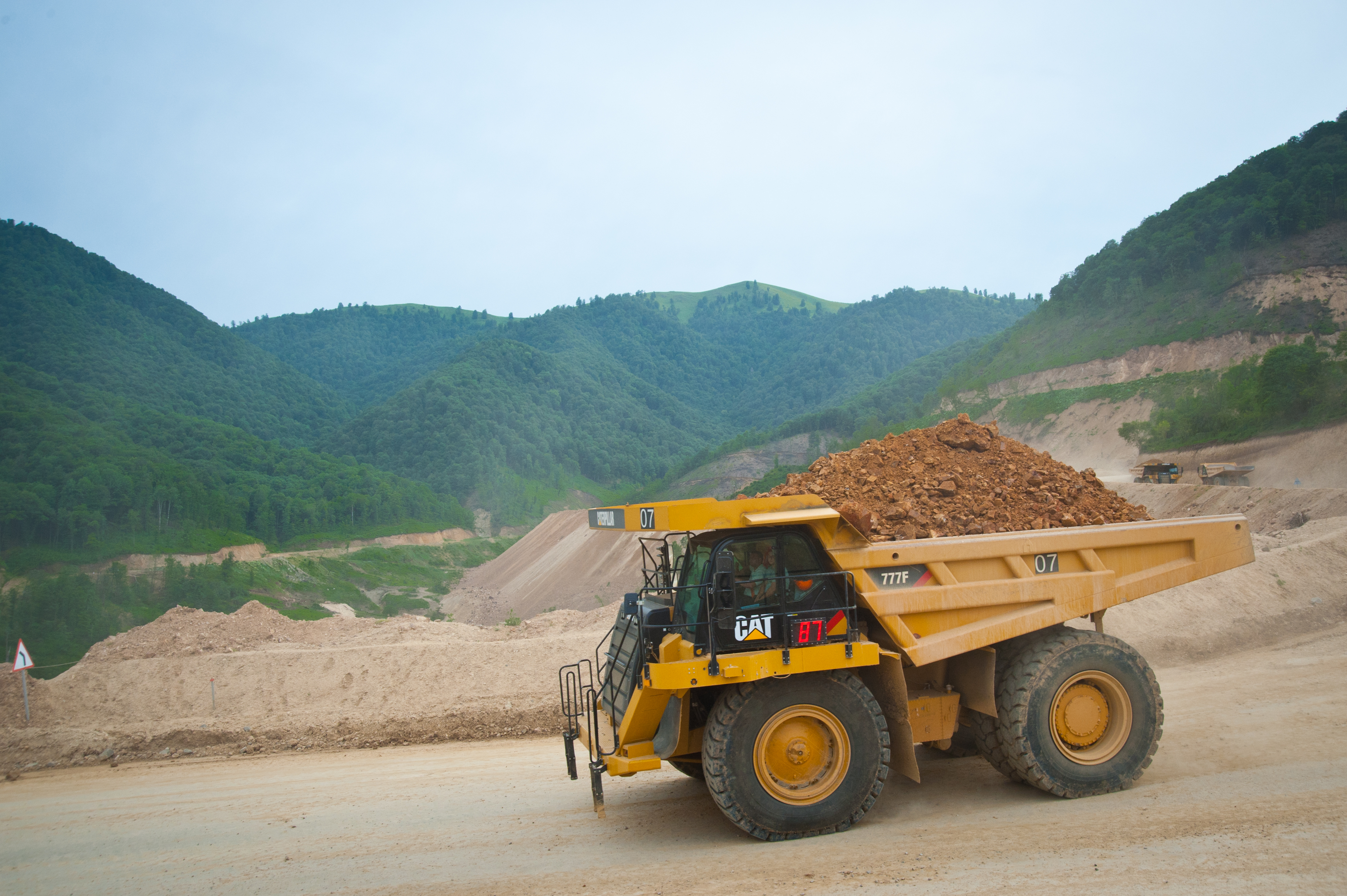
Mining trucks at work

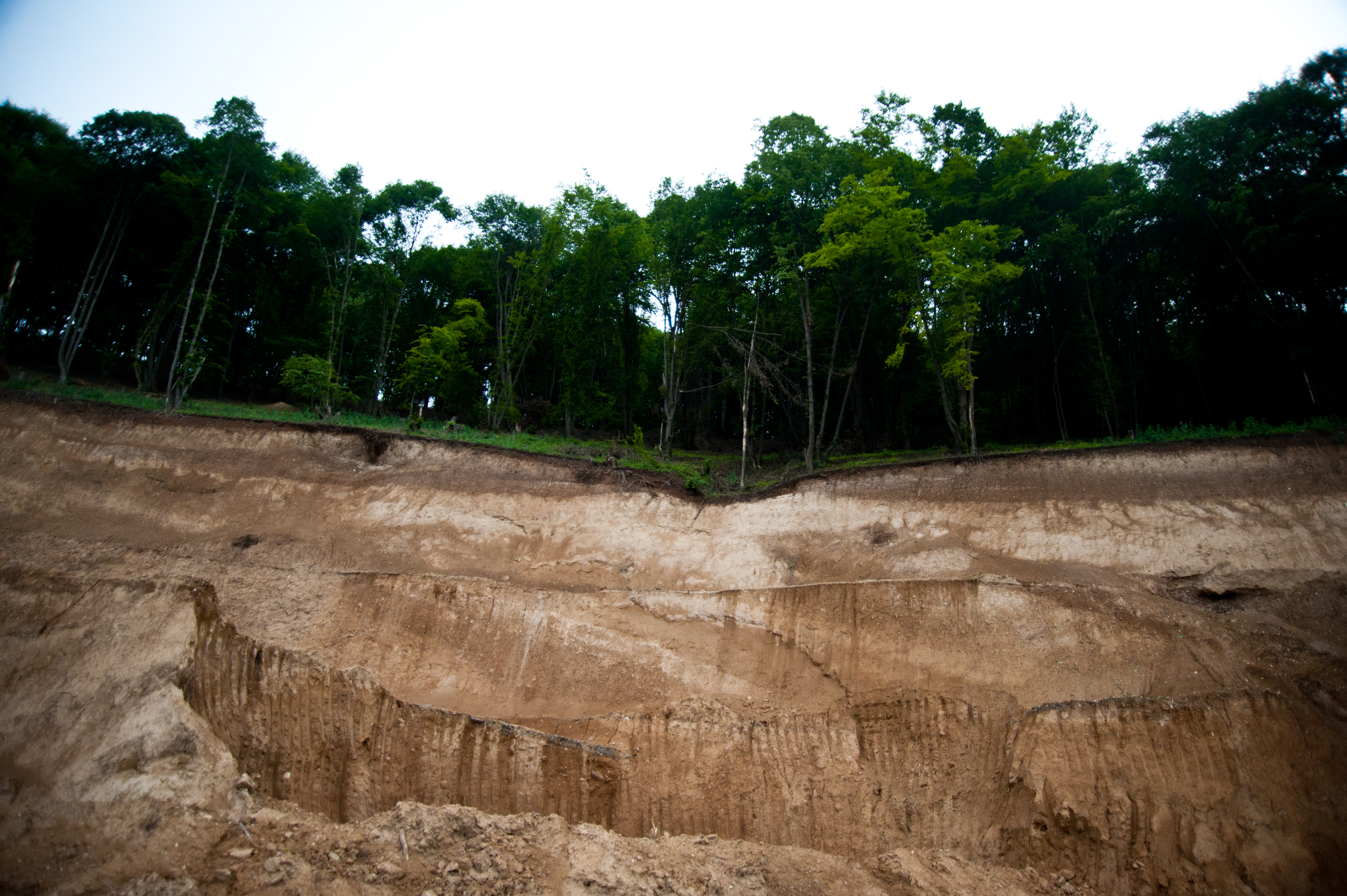
Forest destruction in summer 2012

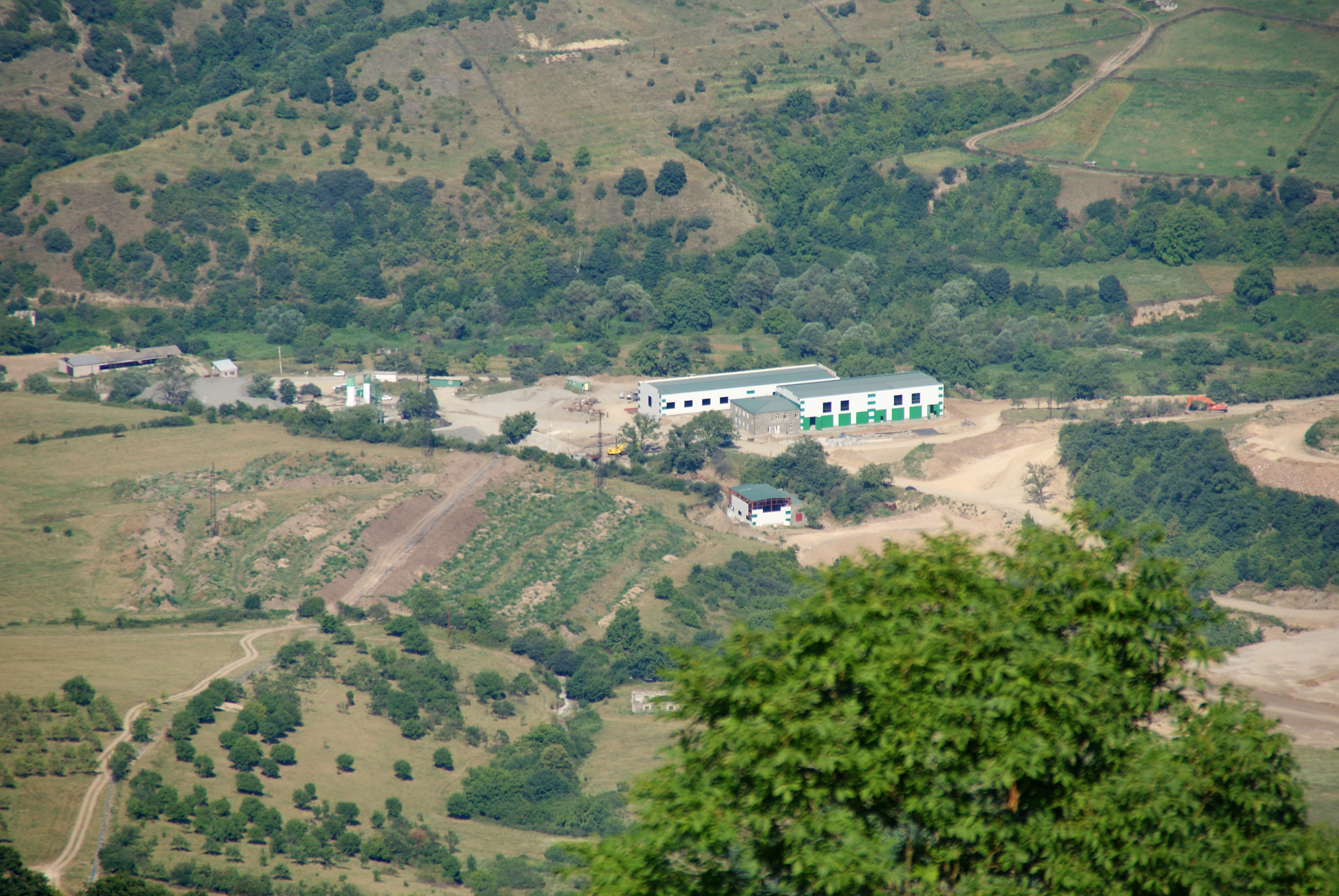
Main entrance and administrative buildings, with beginning of tailings dump on the lower right

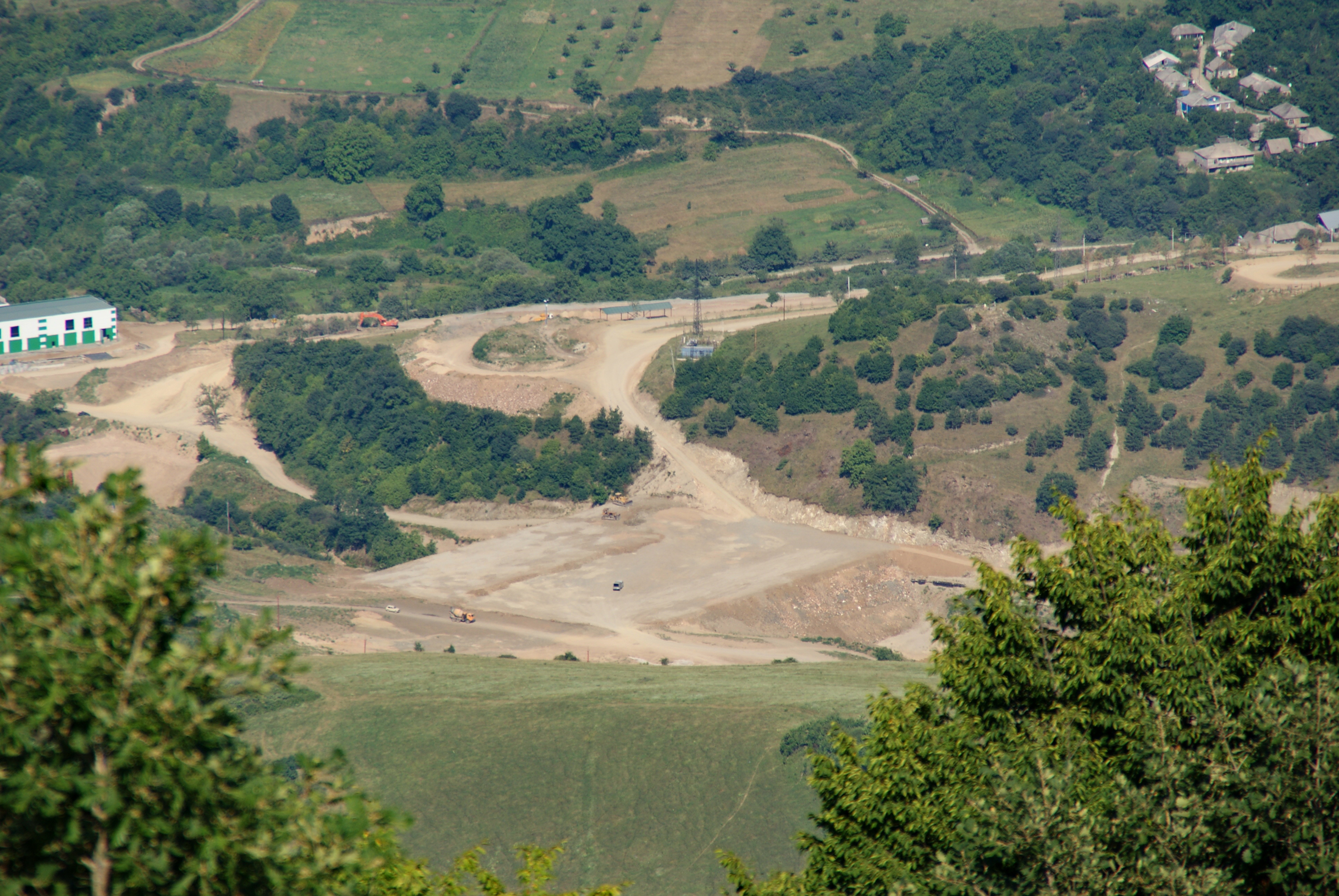
Construction of tailings dump

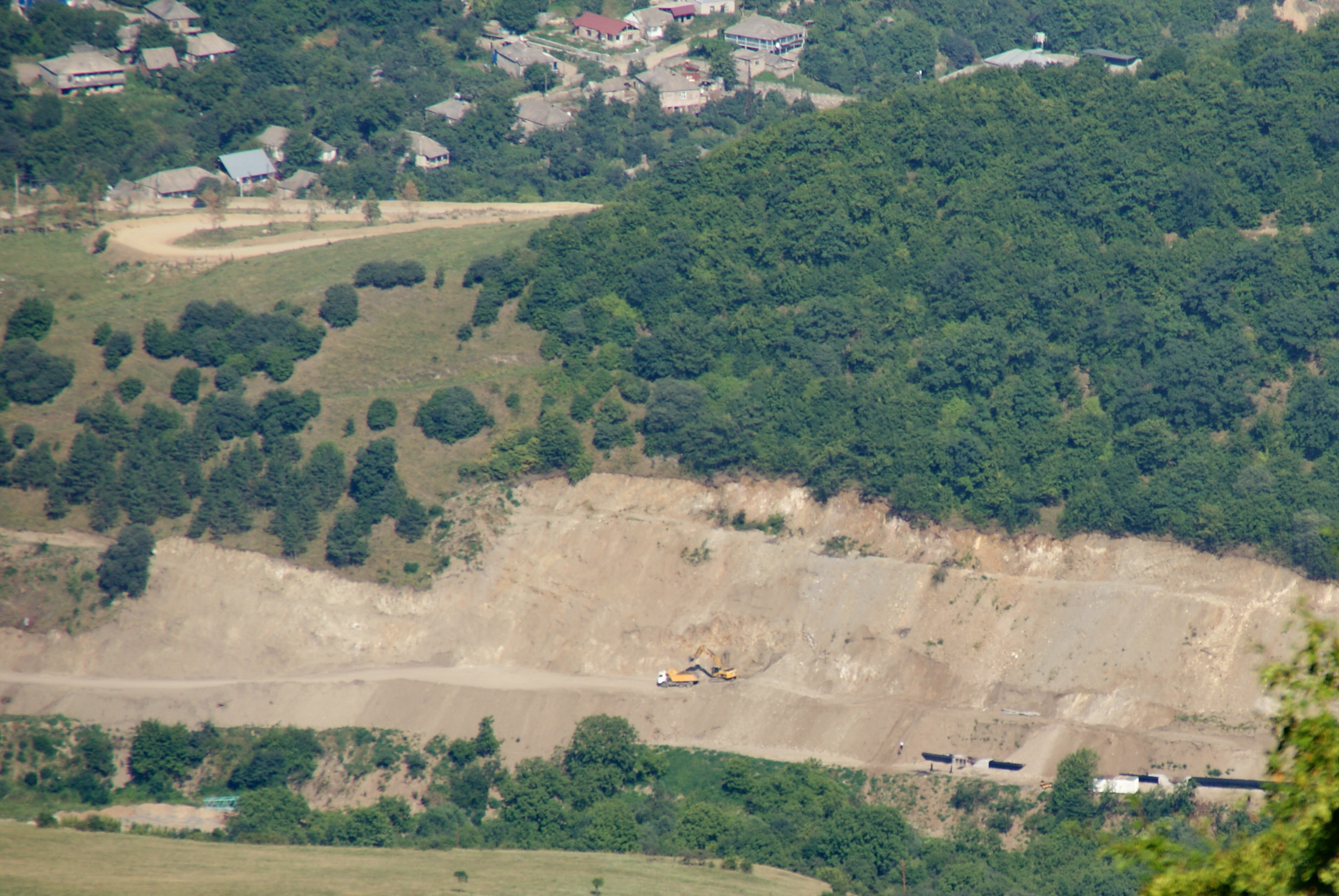
Construction of massive tailings dump with Teghut village in the background

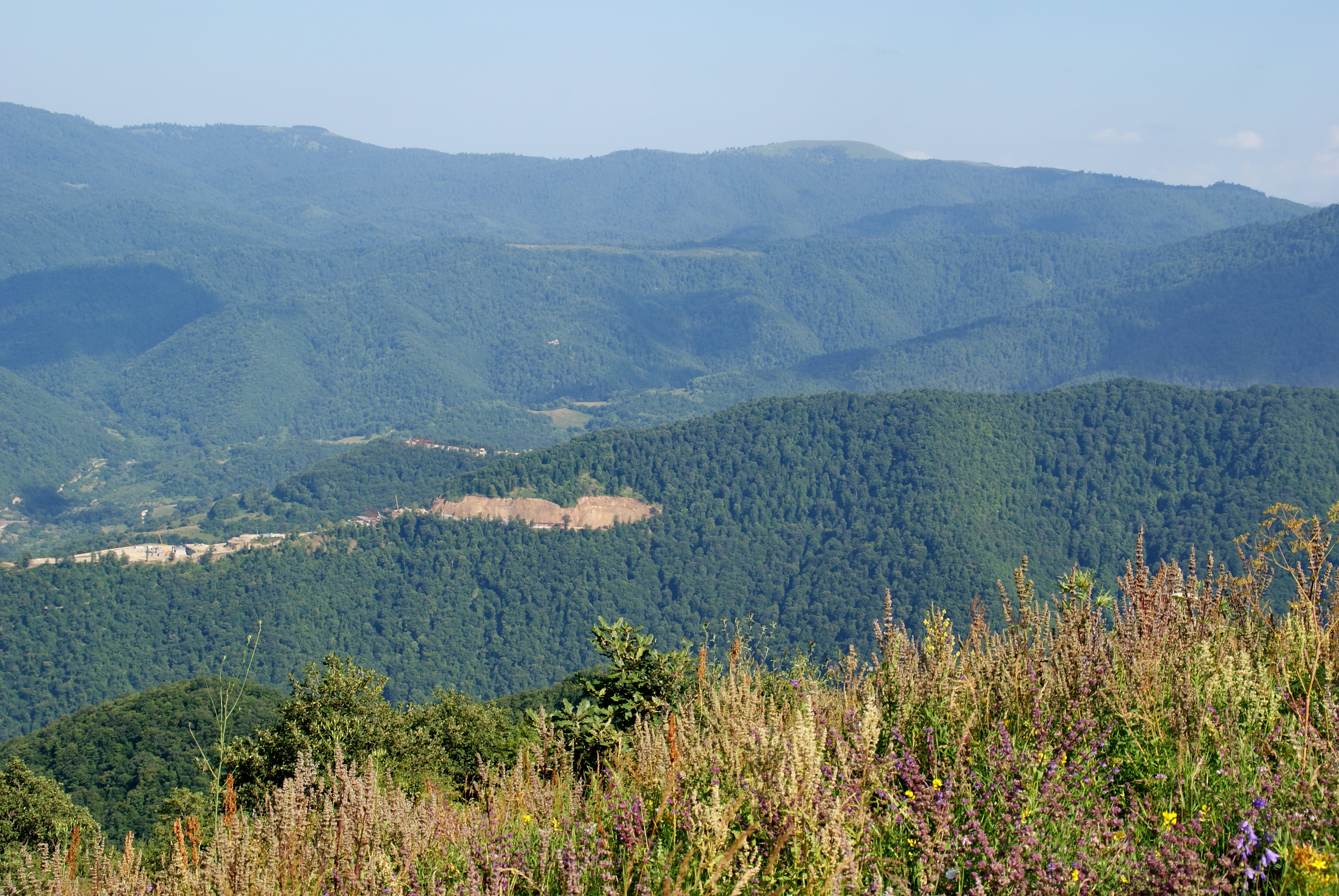
General view of ore processing facility (under construction) and forest

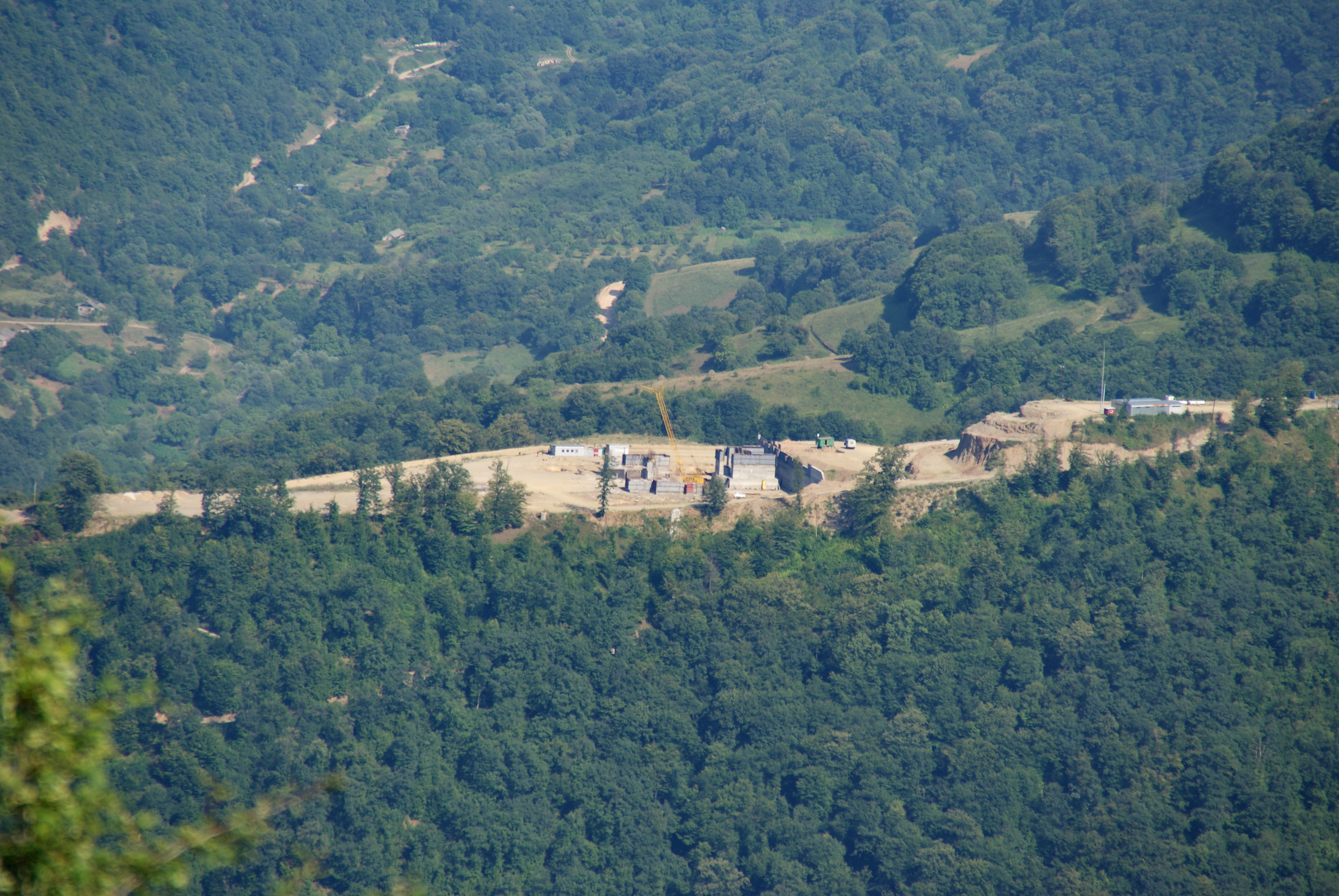
Closeup of main ore processing facility area

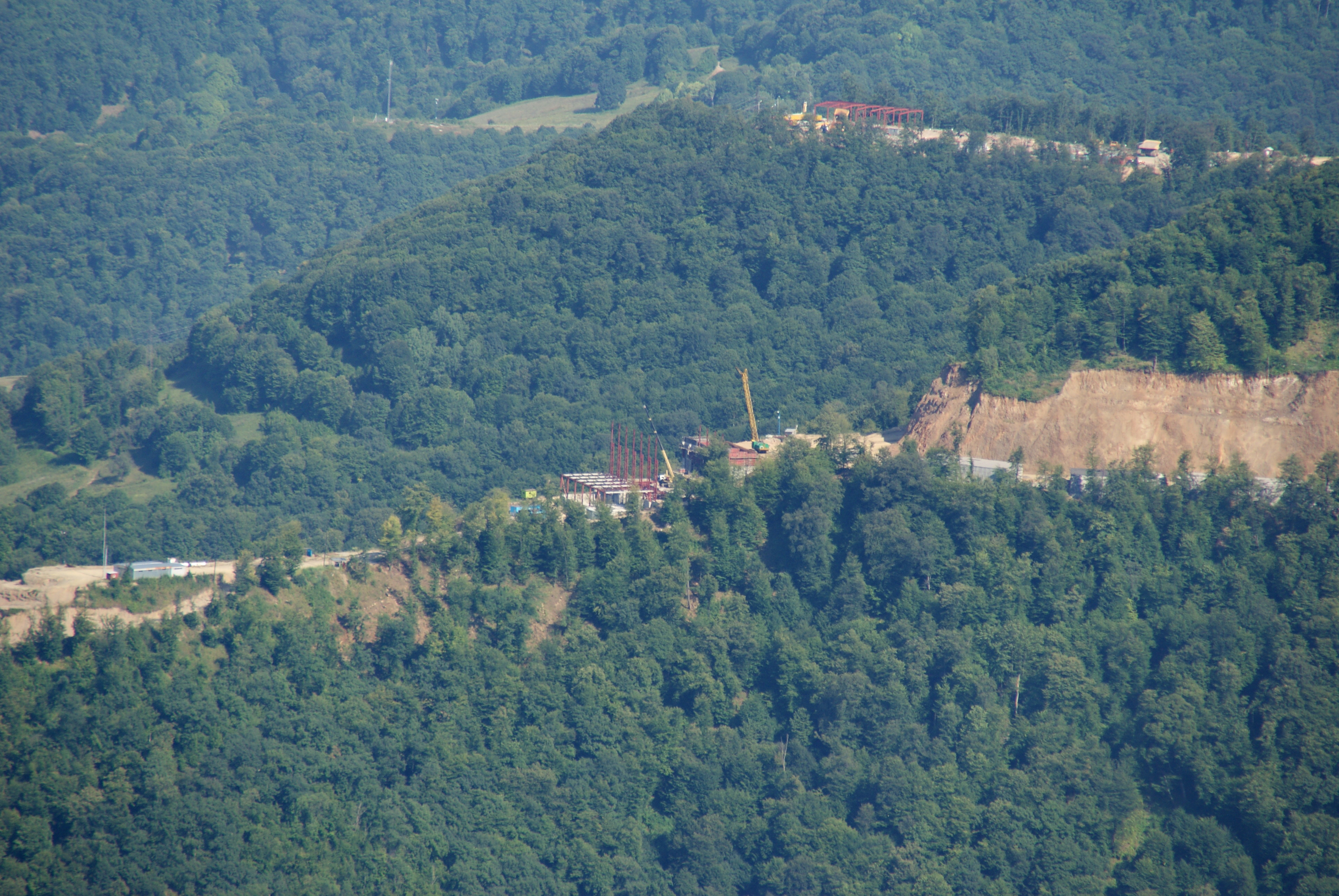
Construction of ore processing facility

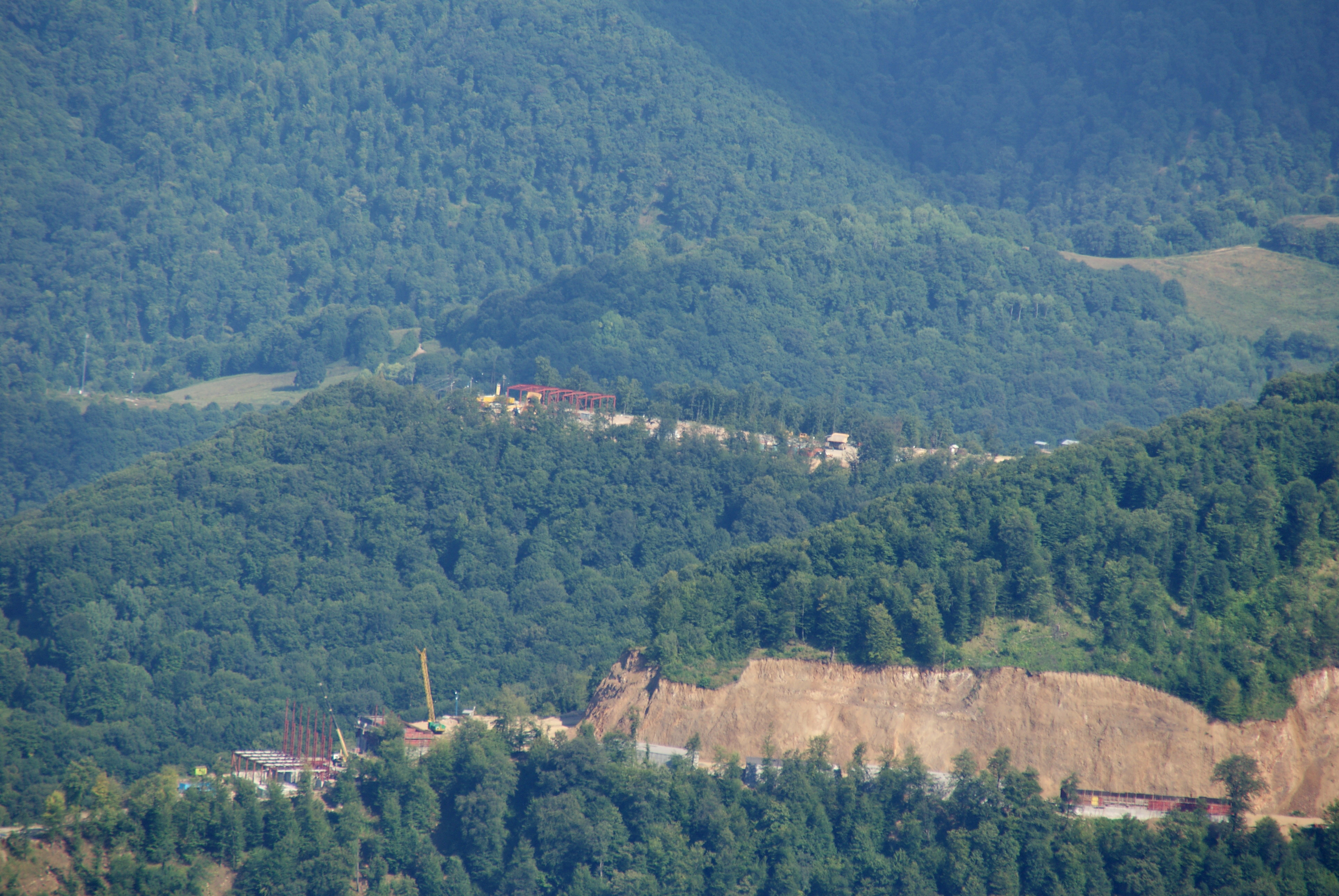
Construction of ore processing facility

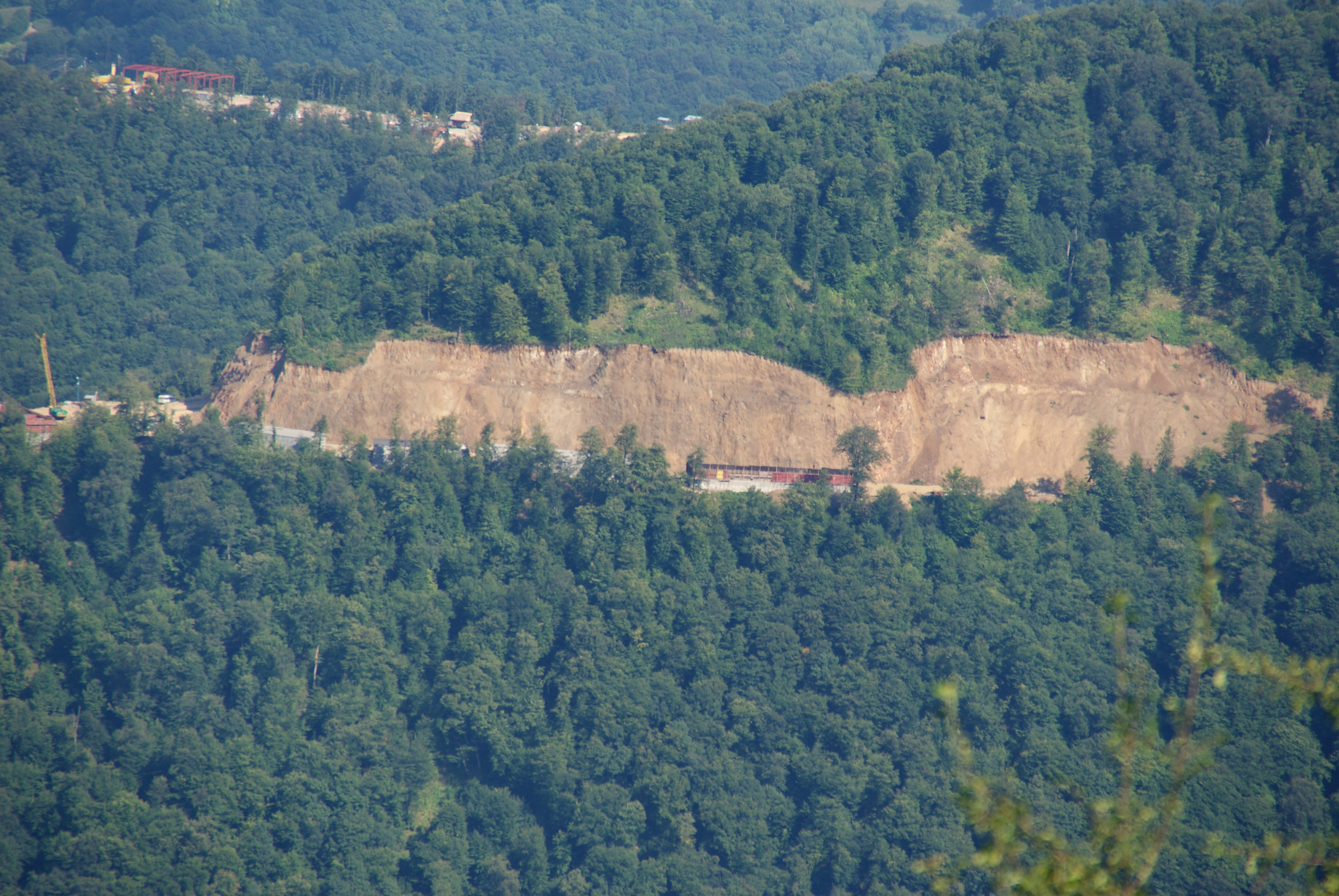
Closeup of raw ore receiving area

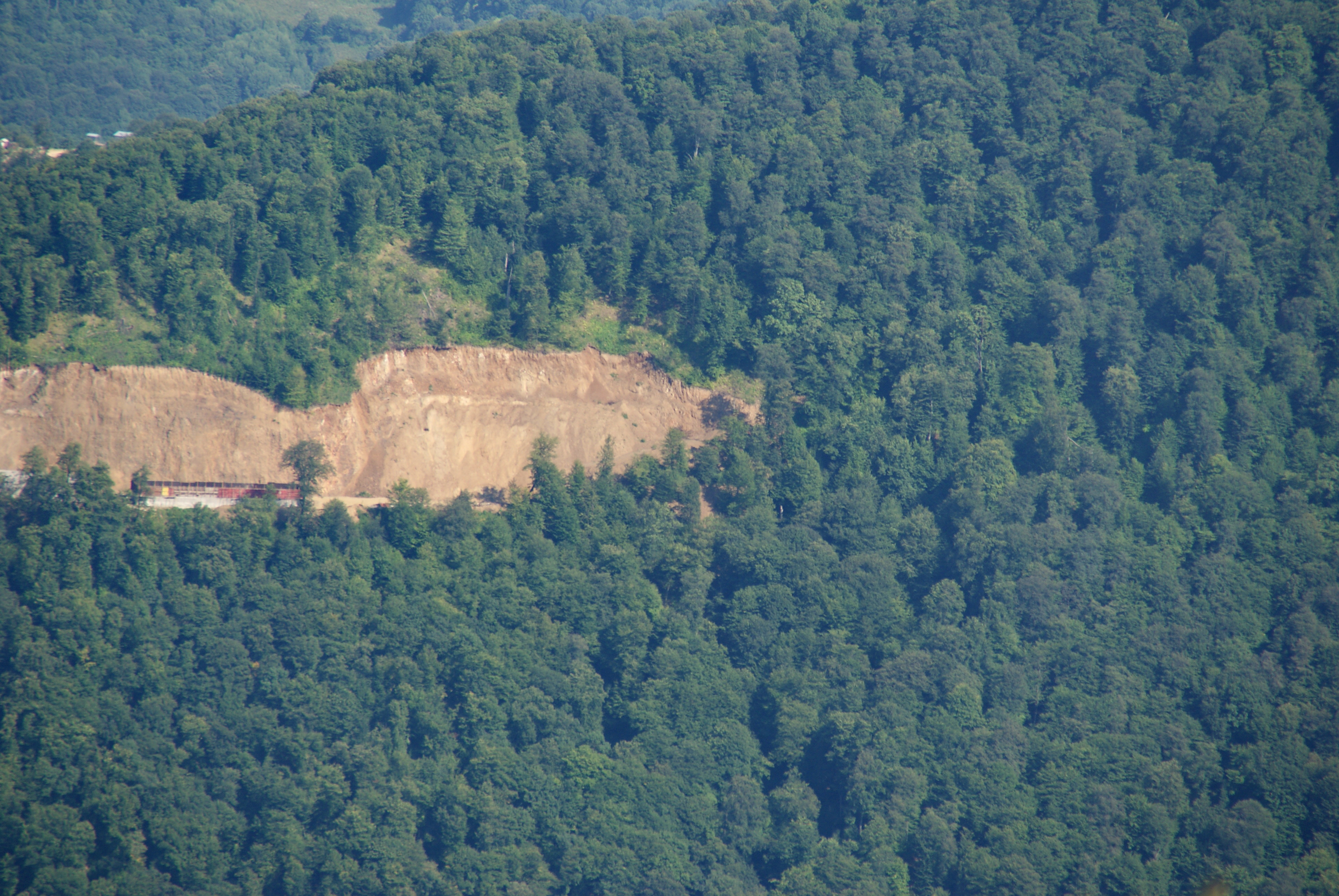

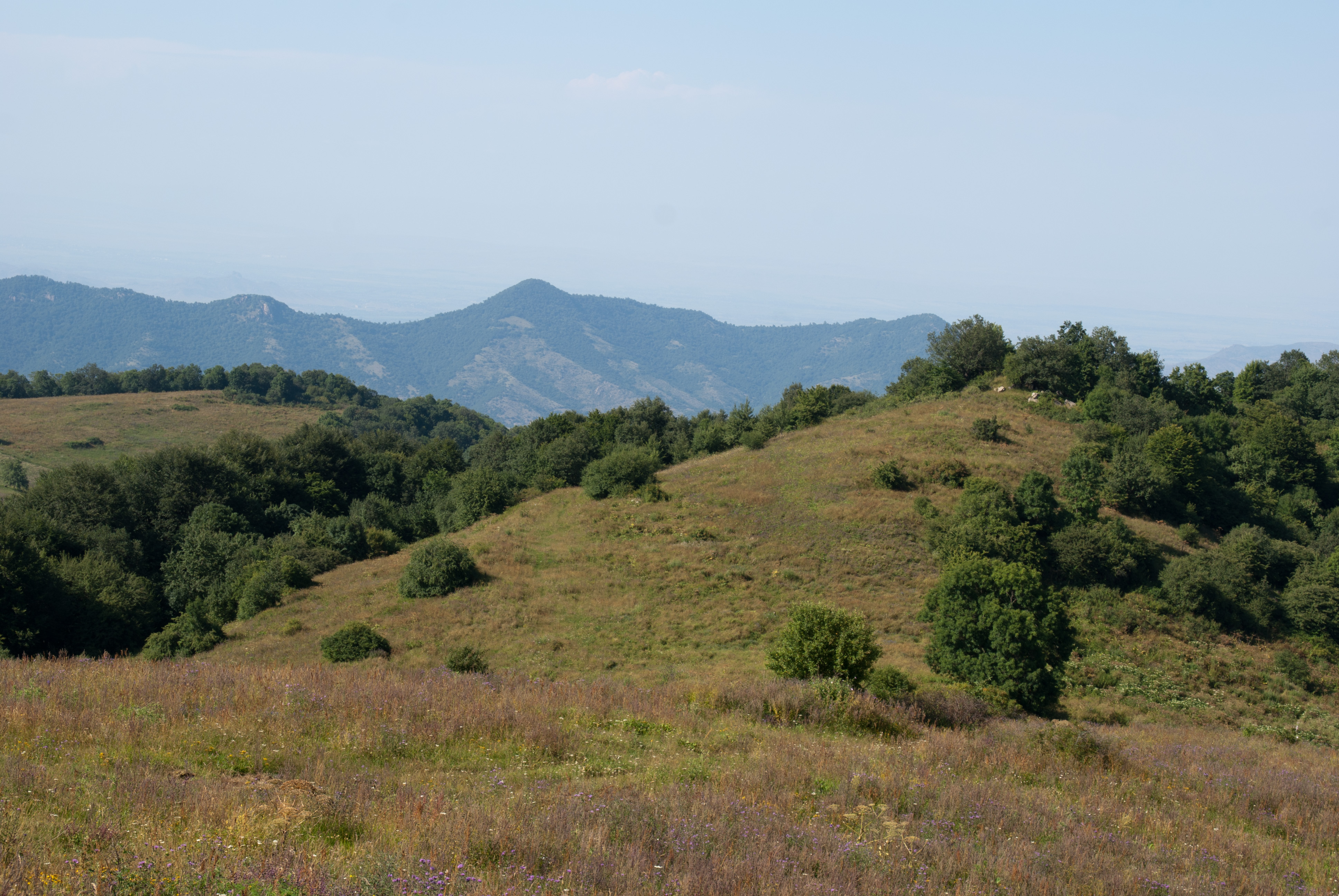
View north towards Chochkan village and Georgia
2008 (Deforestation)

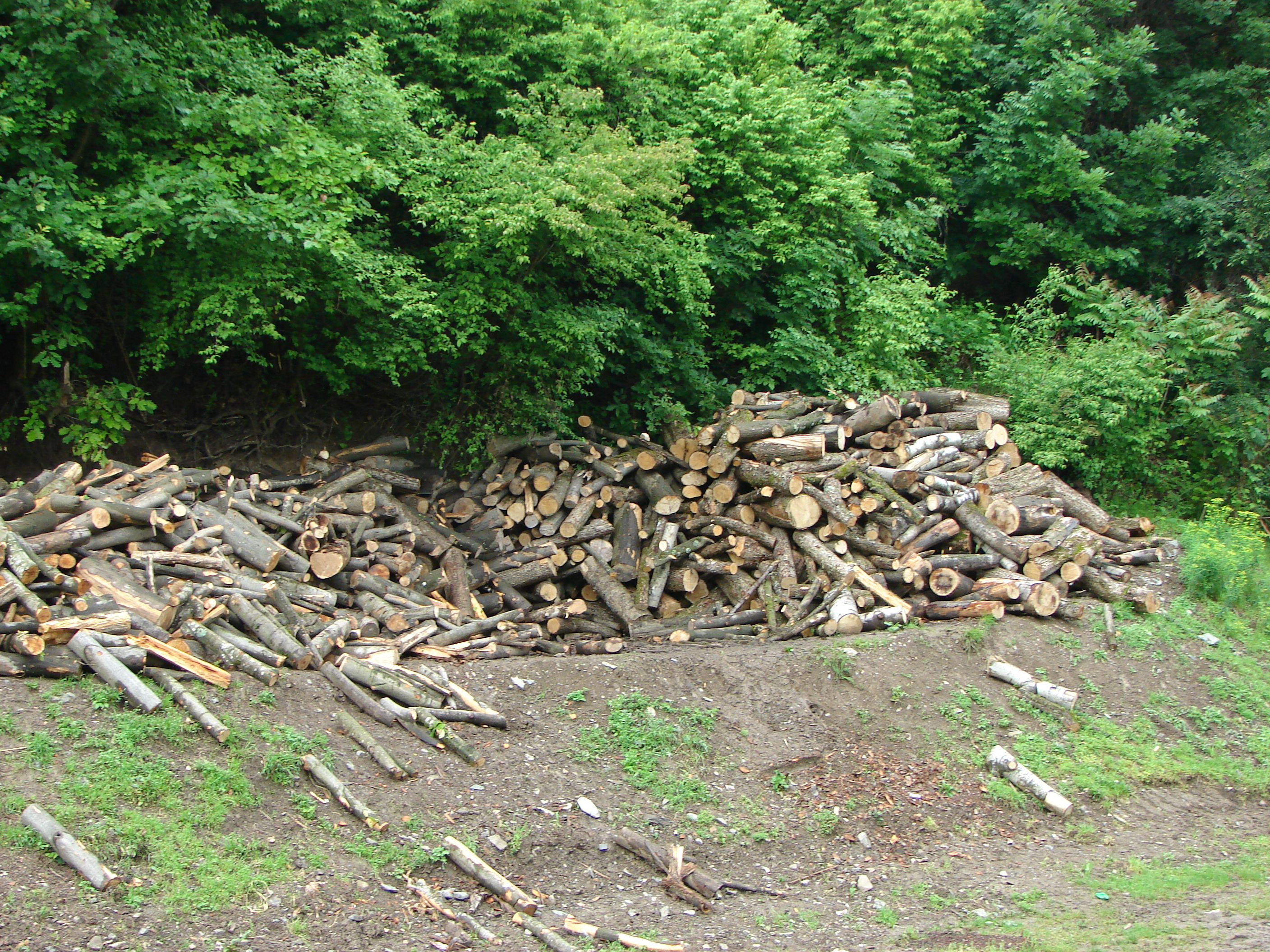
Trees cut into logs

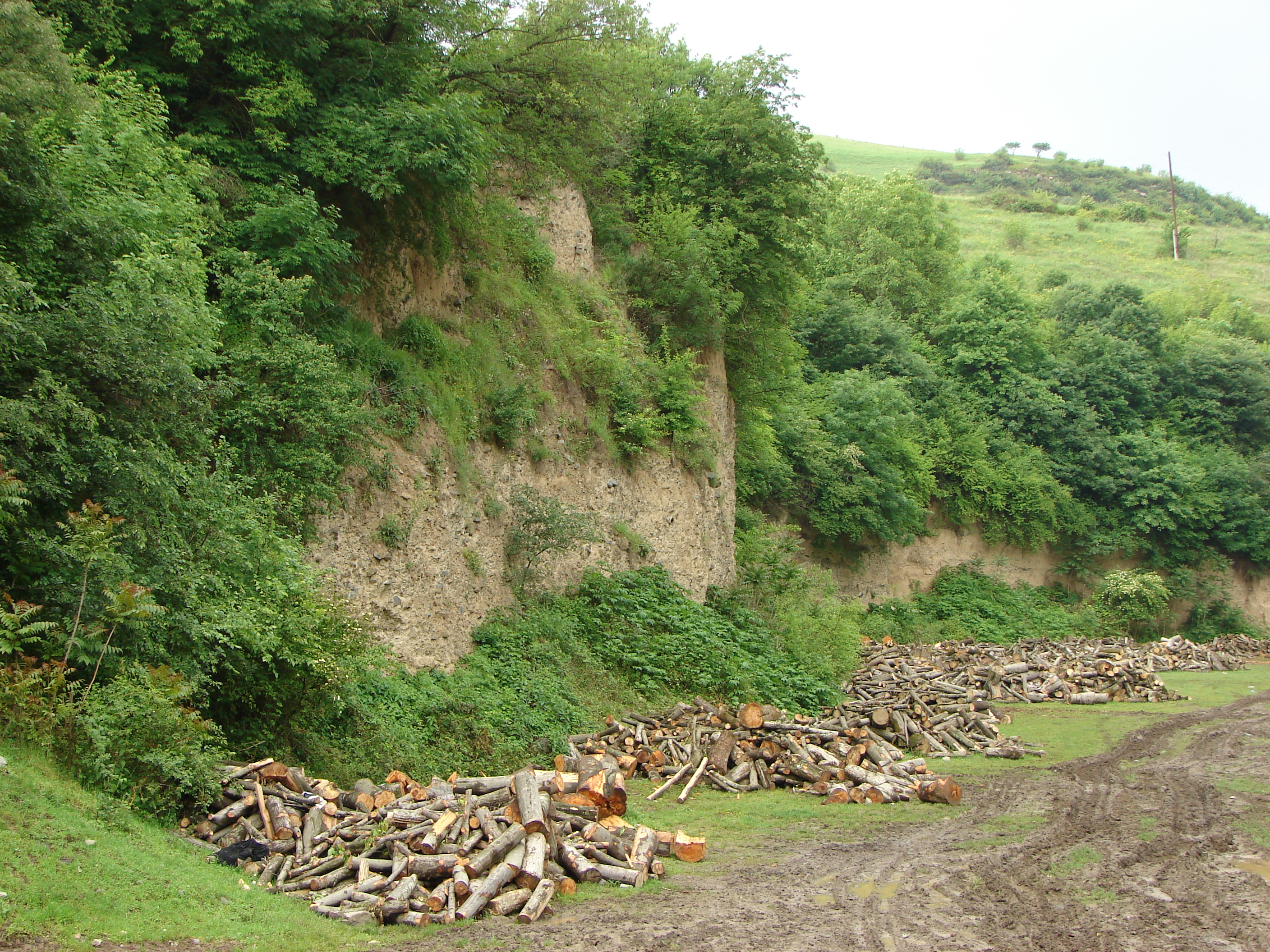
Logs for sale

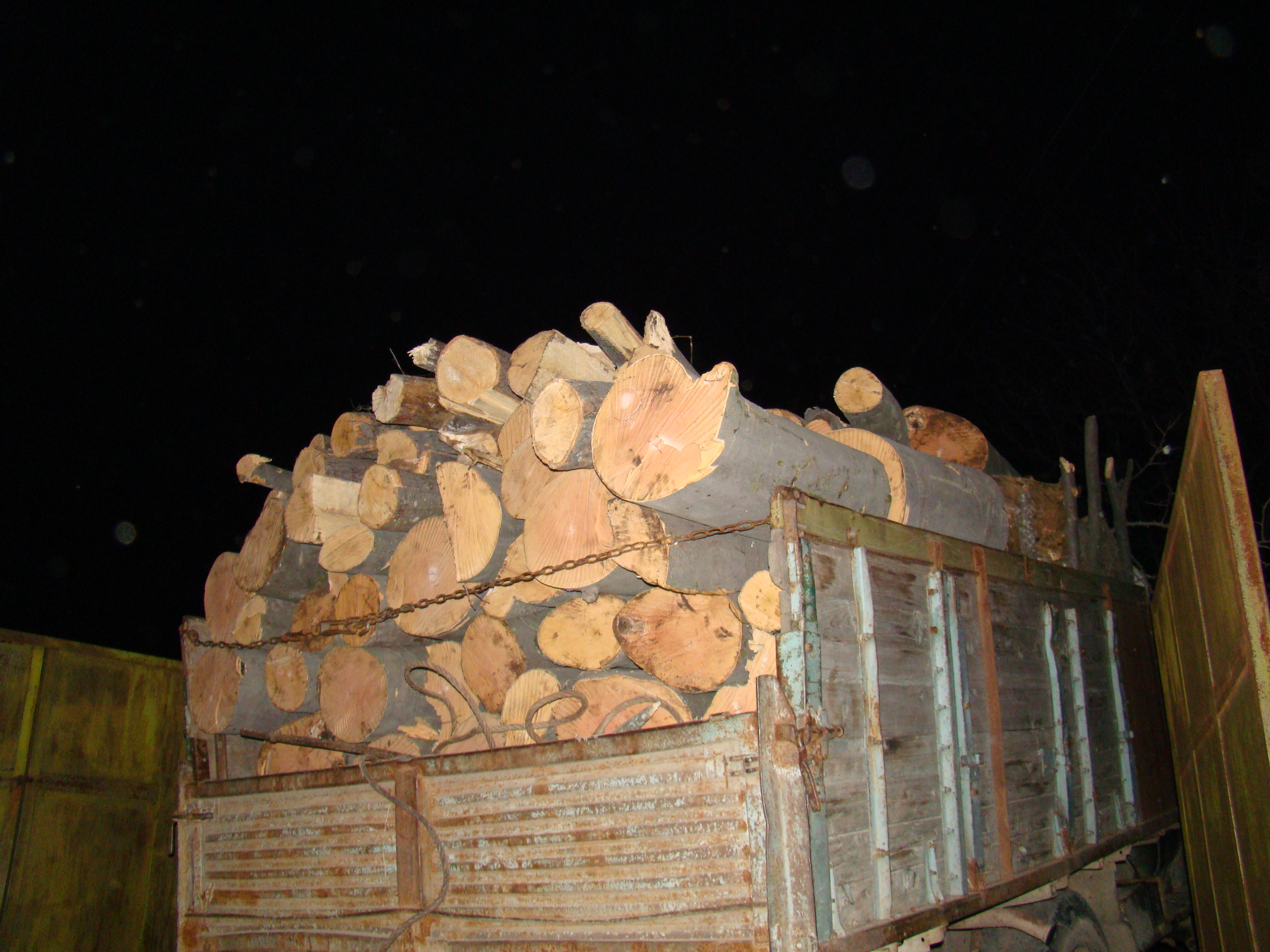
Logs loaded onto a truck

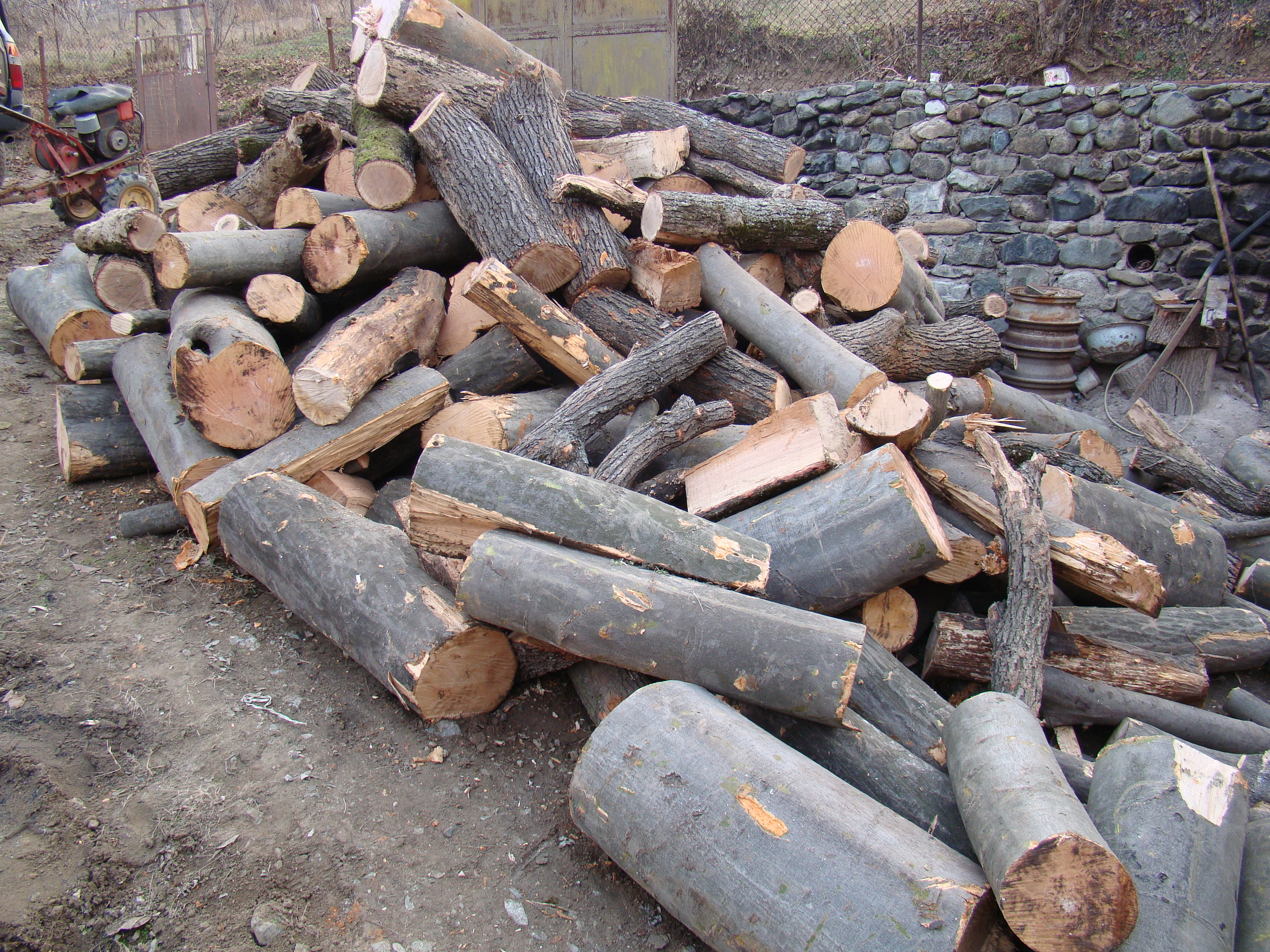
Forest converted to logs

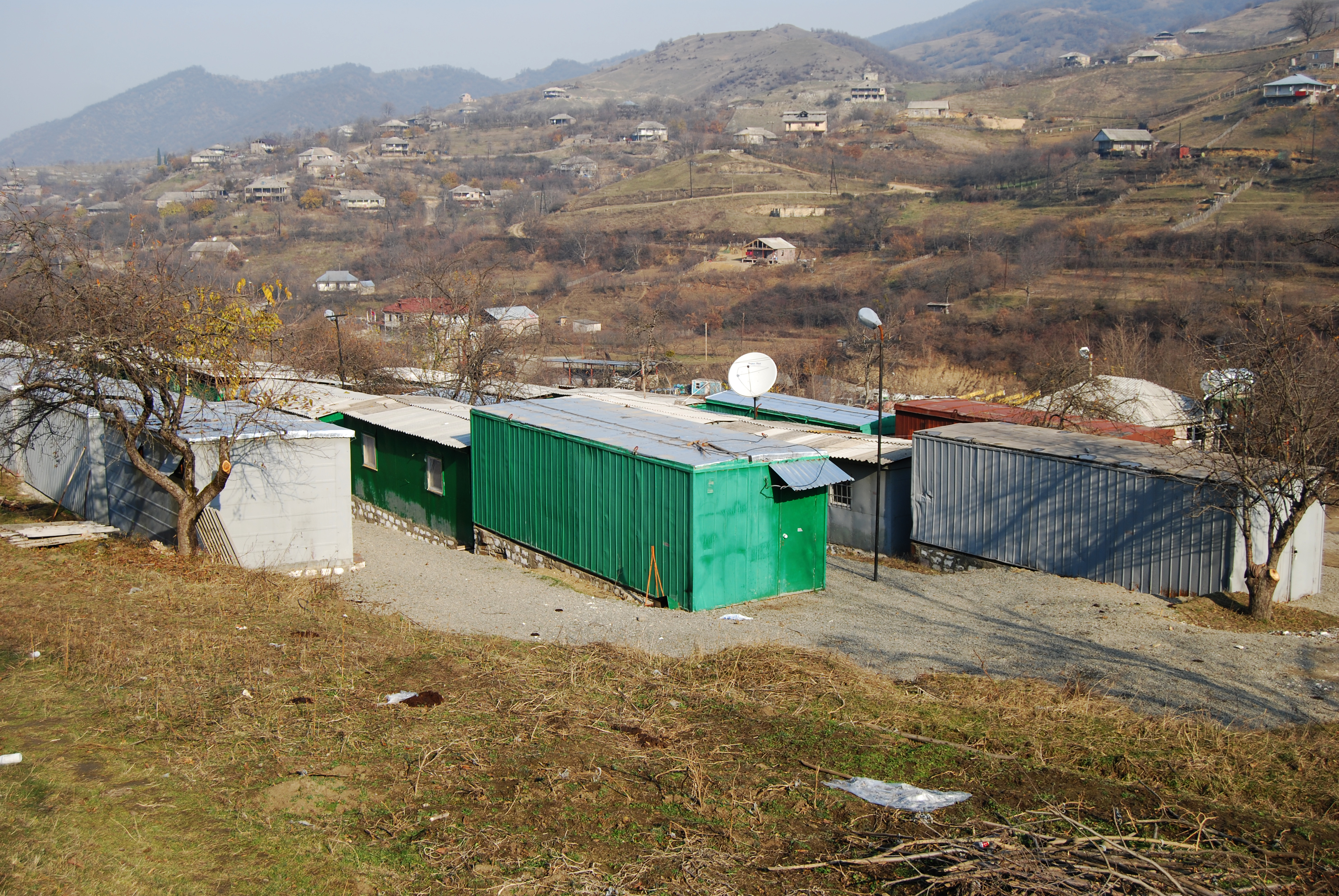
Administrative or workers' quarters
2008 (Location of waste rock storage area)

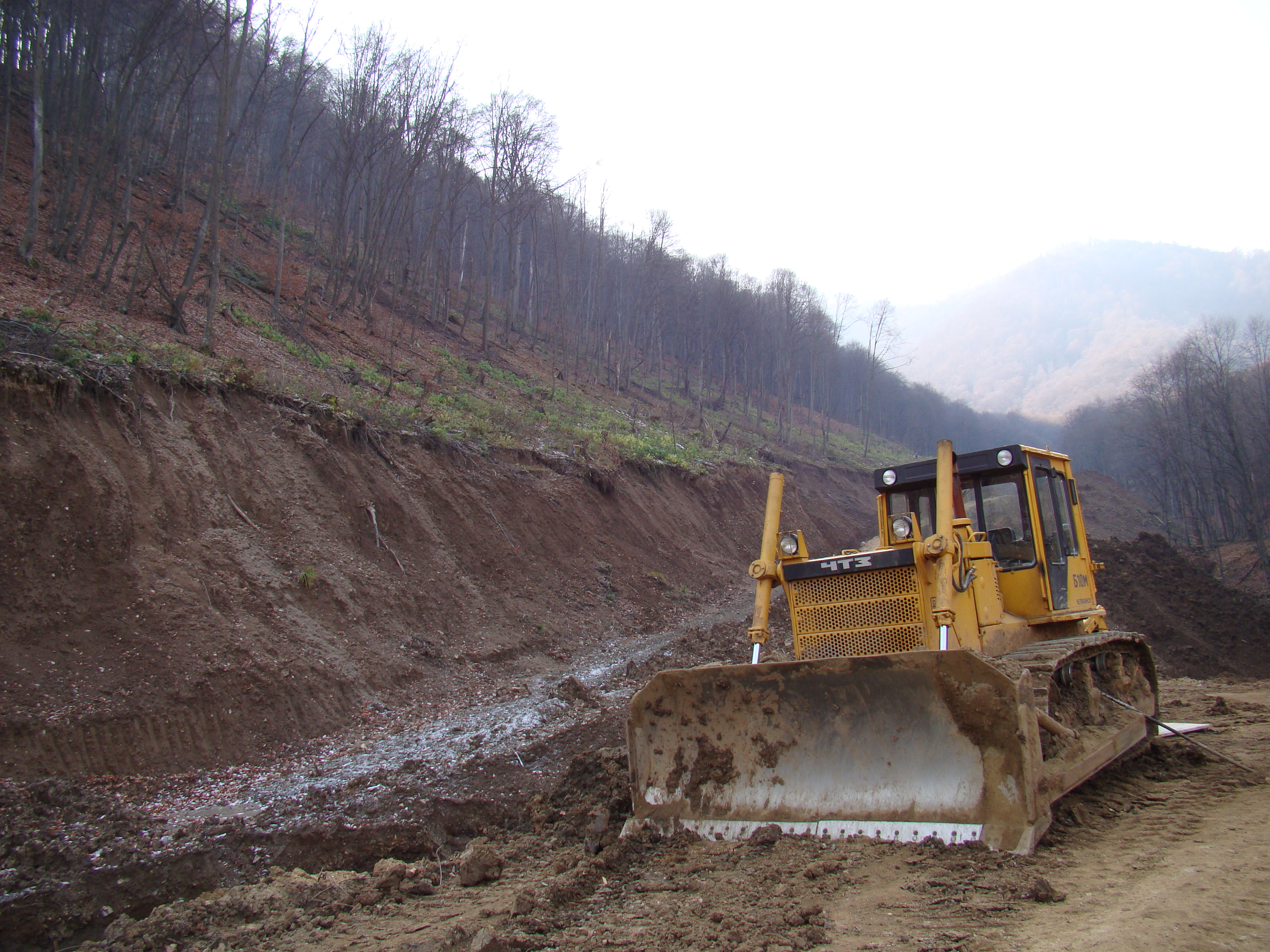

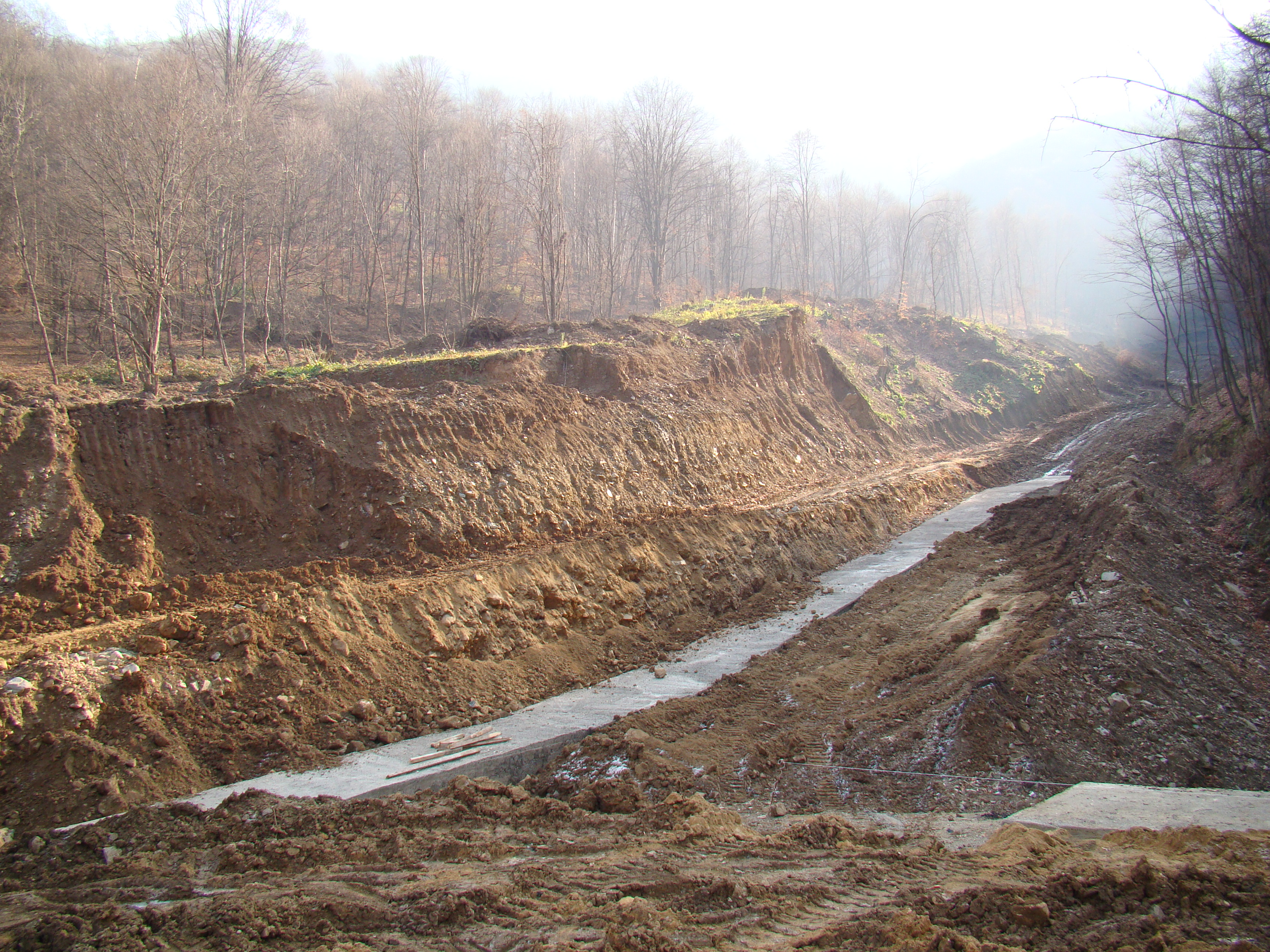

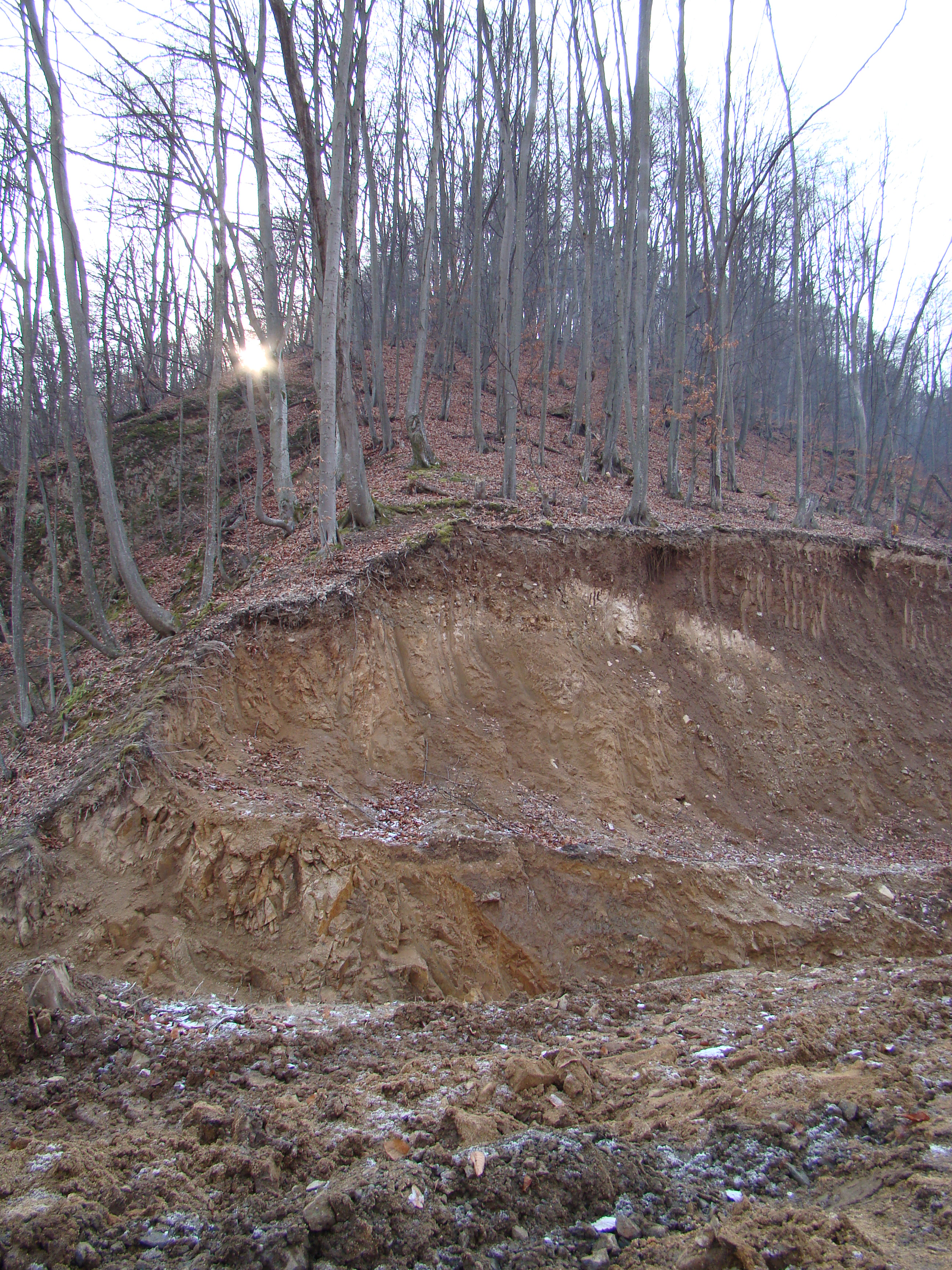

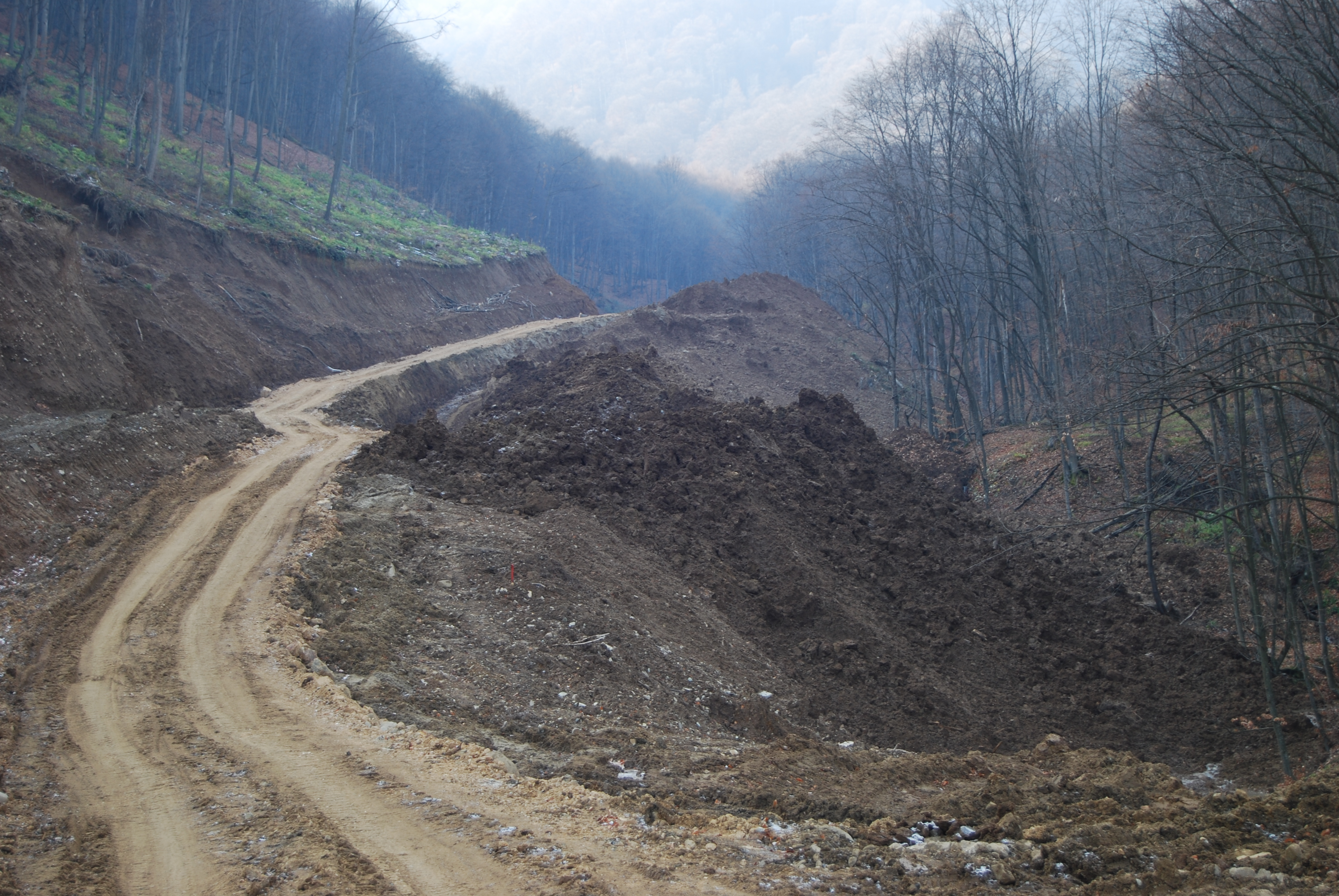

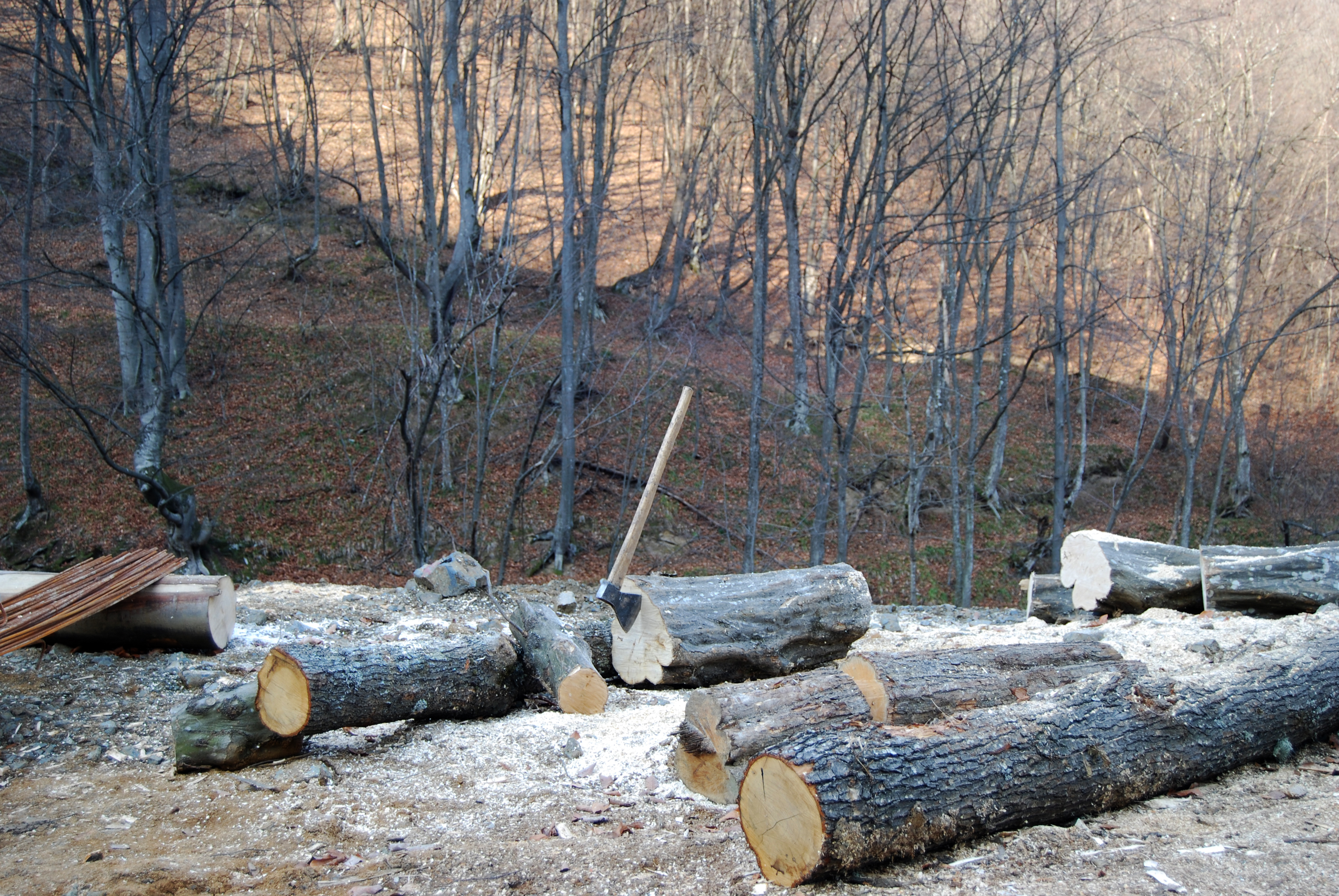
2008 (Location of future tailings dump)

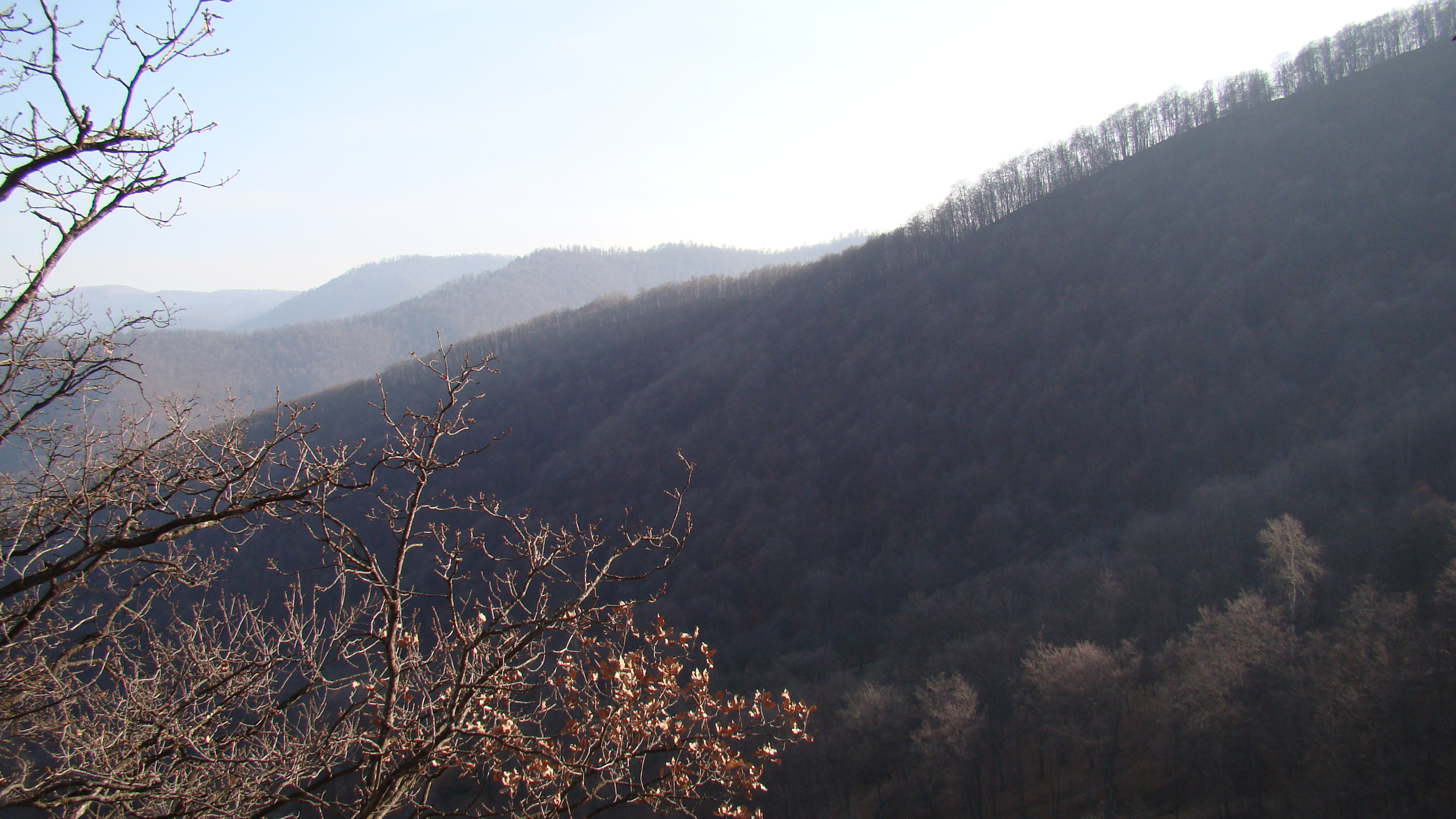
General view

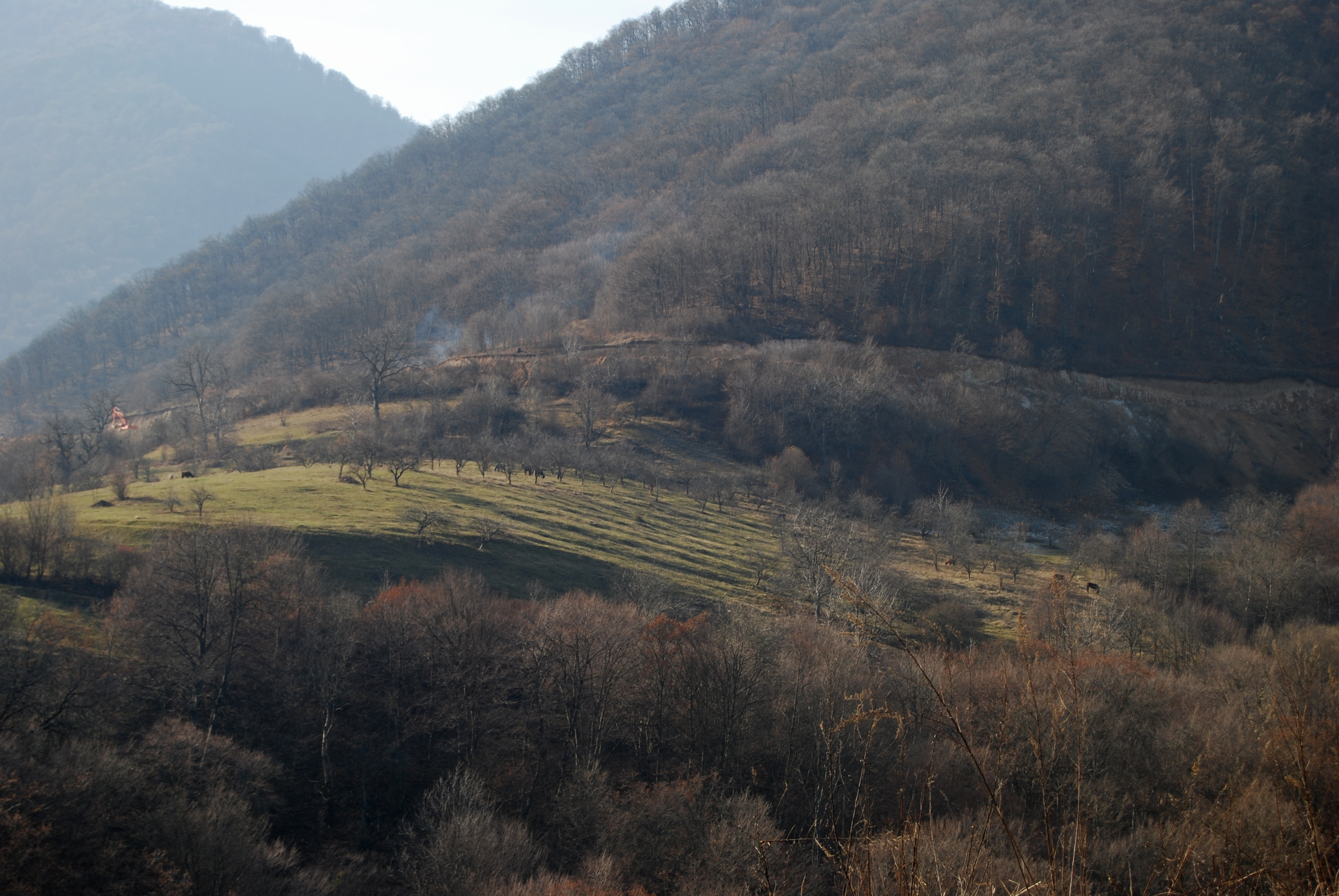
Another general view

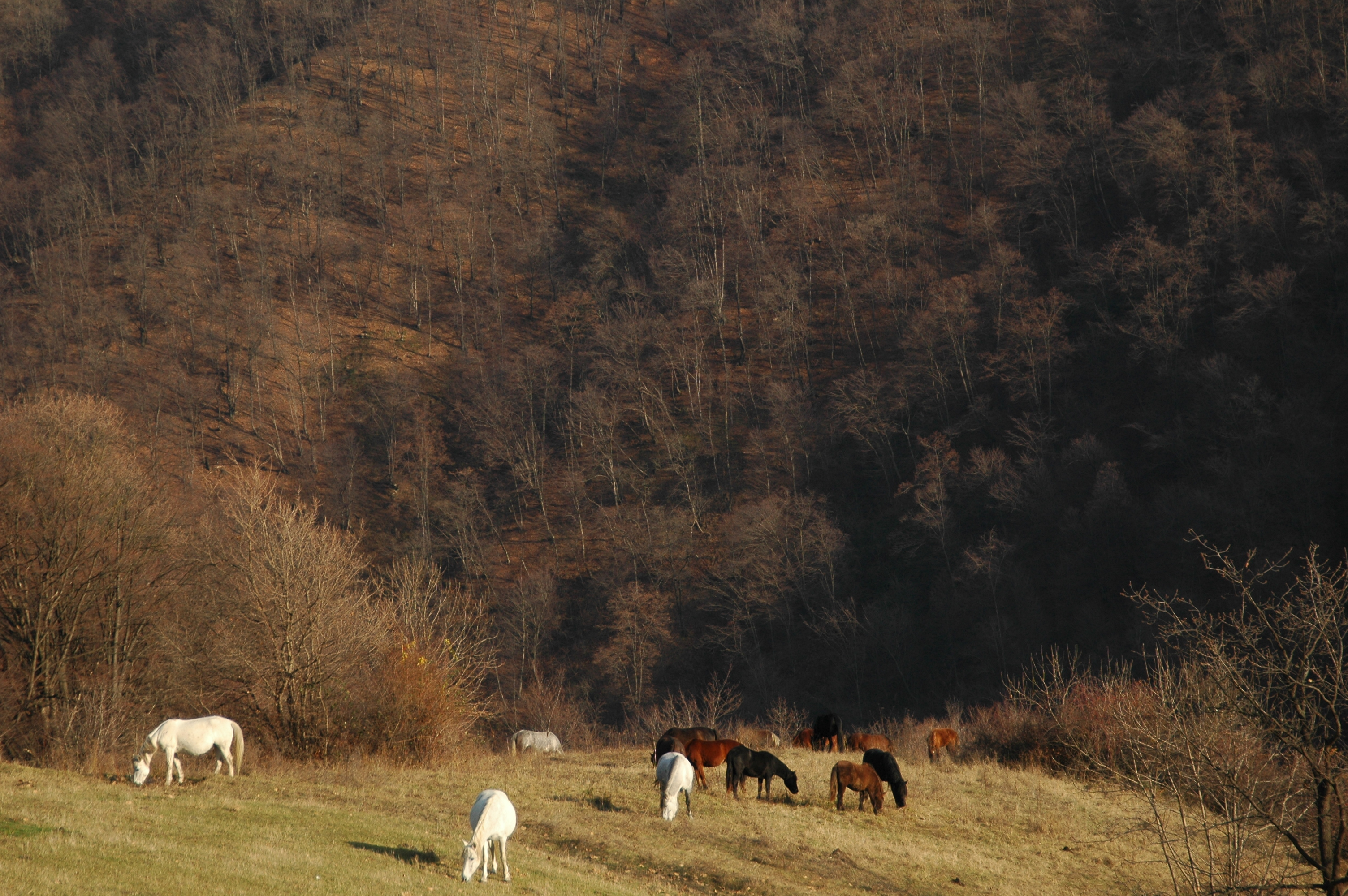
Horses grazing

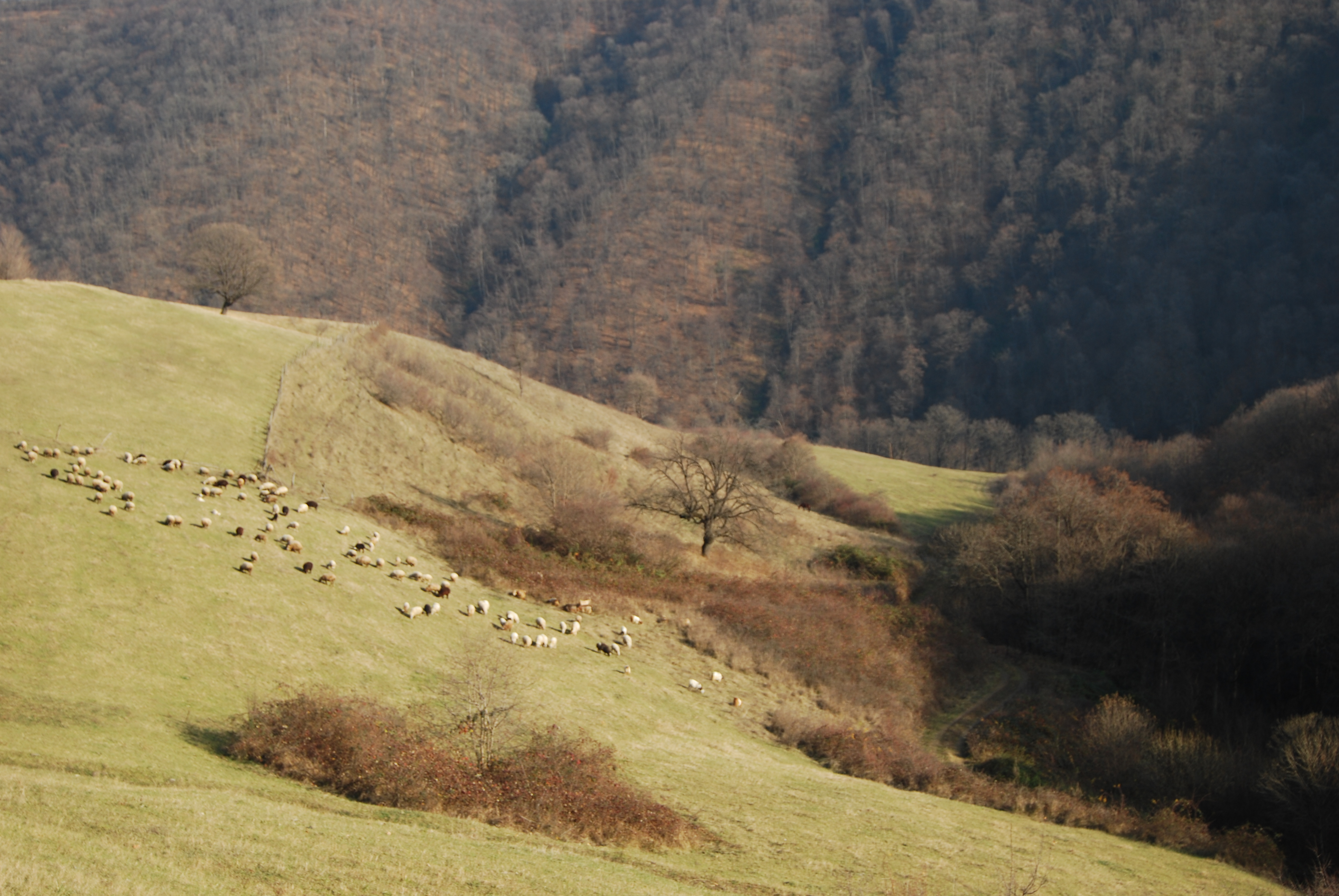
Livestock grazing

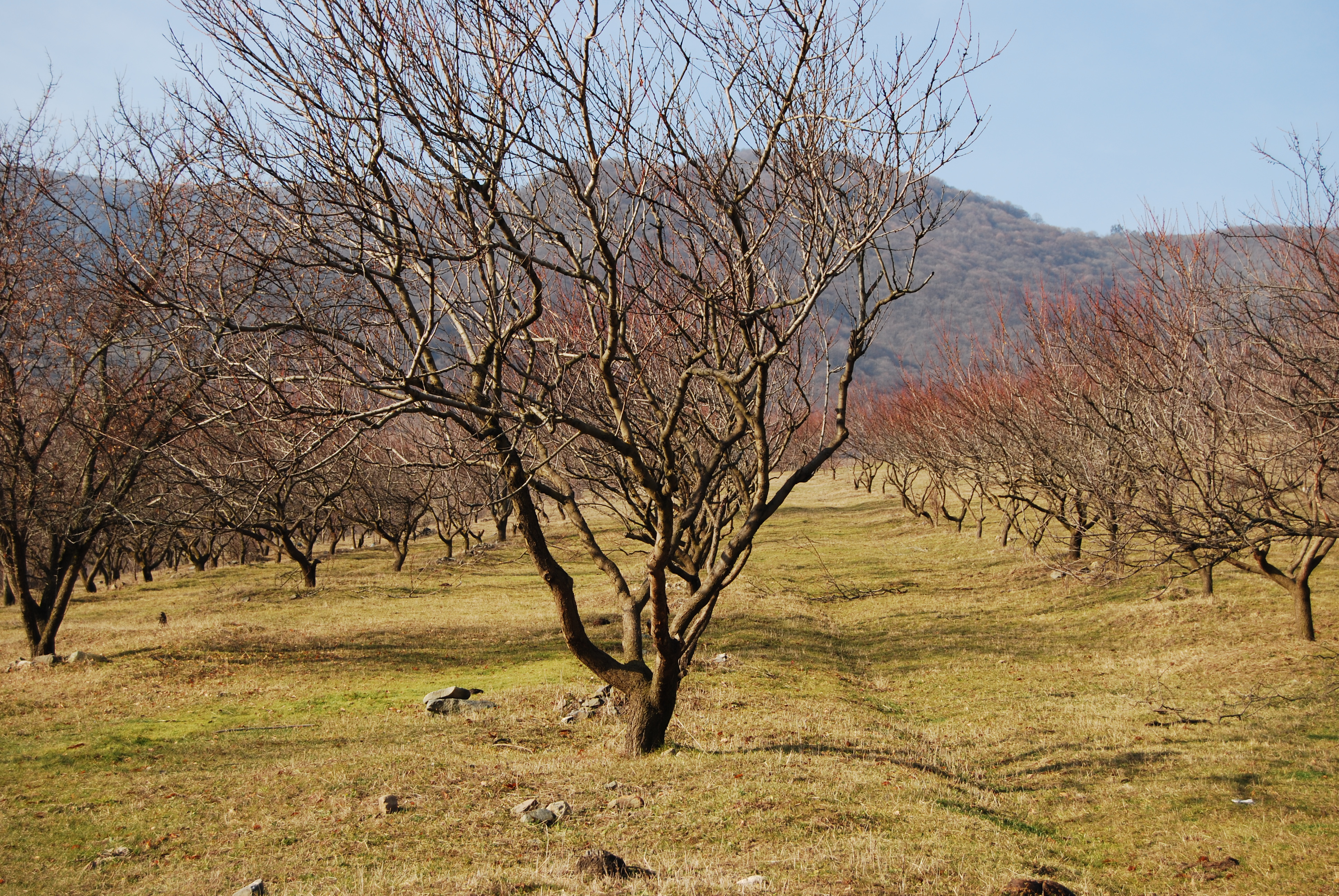
Peach trees

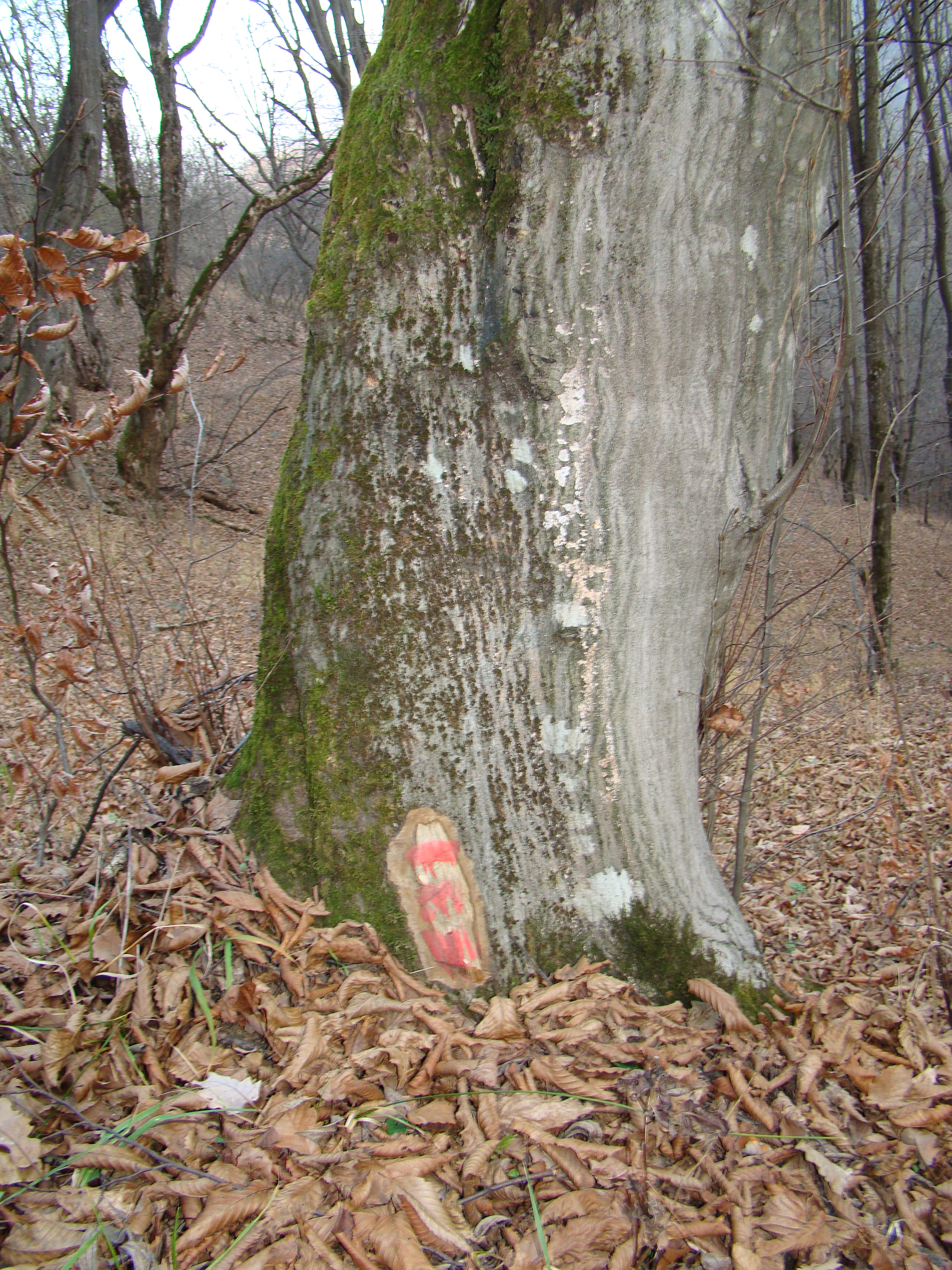
Tree marked to be cut

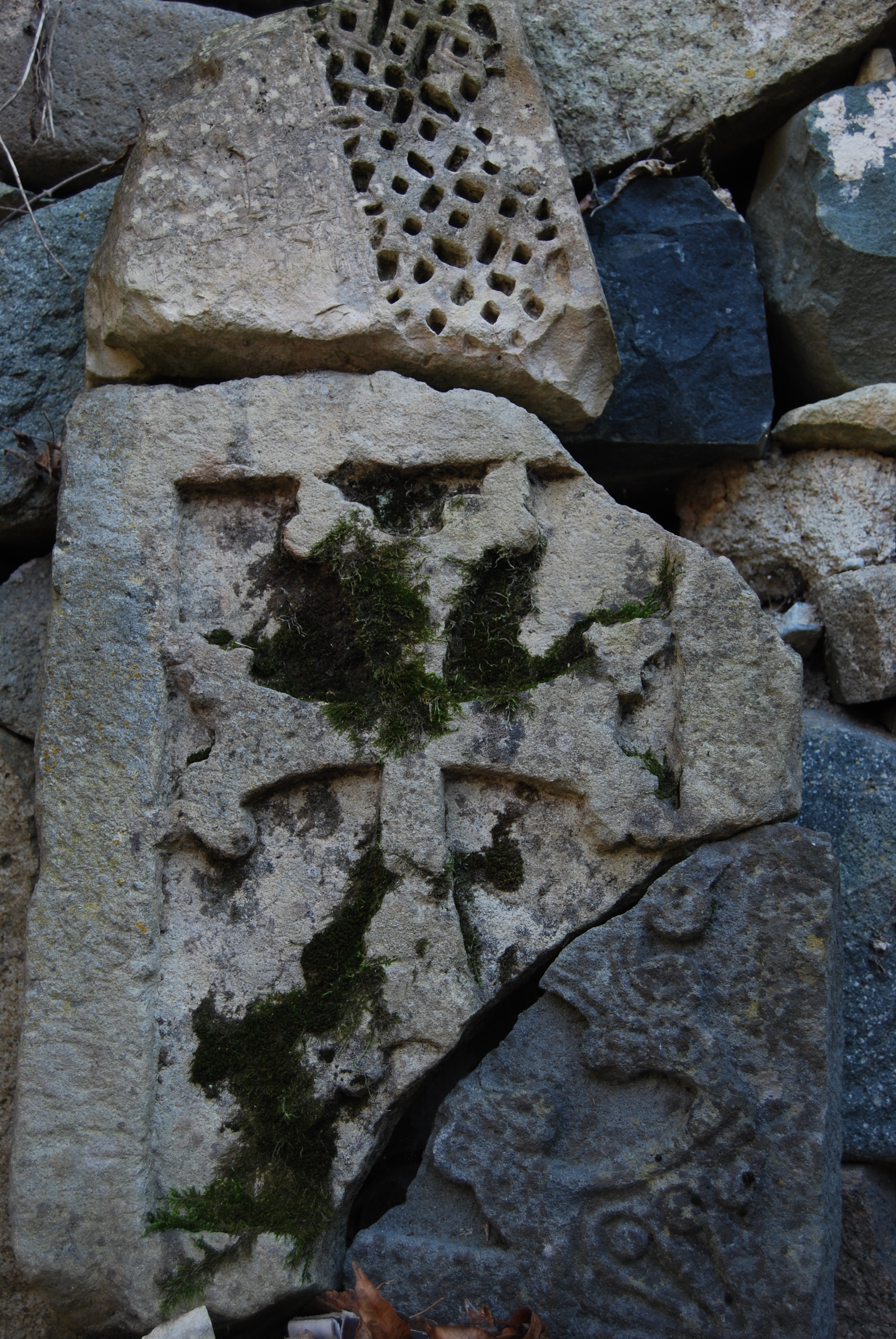
Khachkar

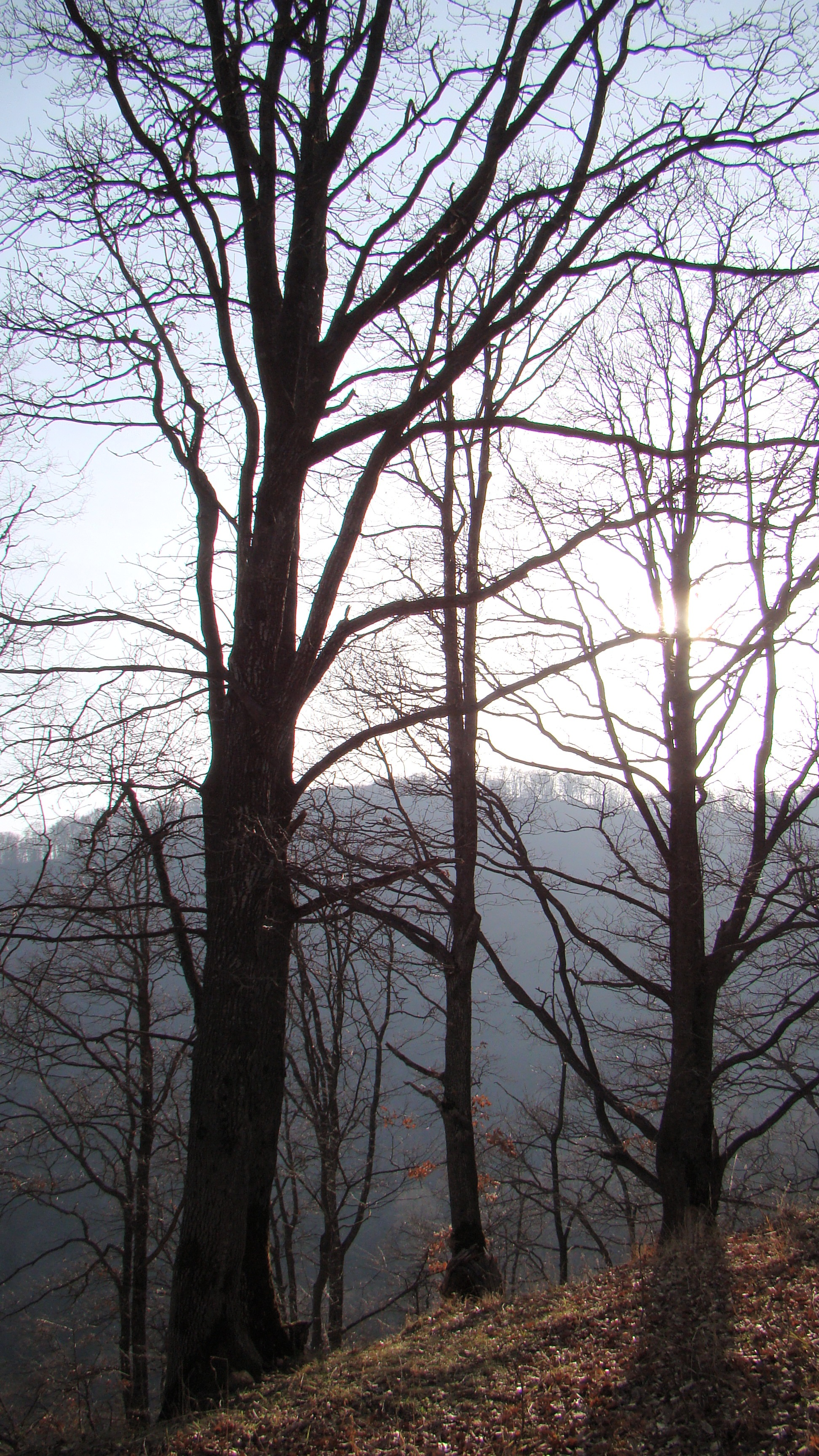
Trees

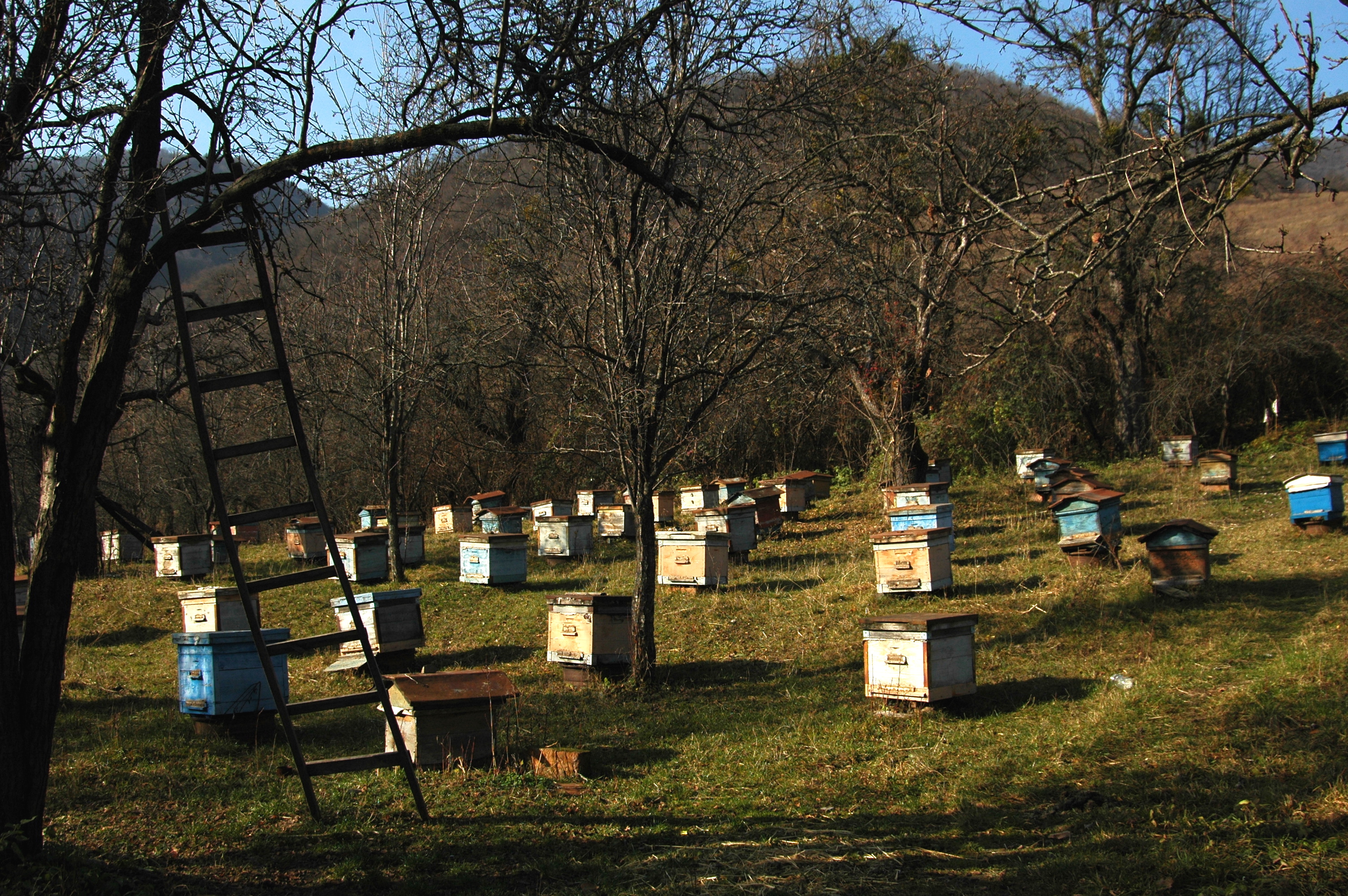
Beehives

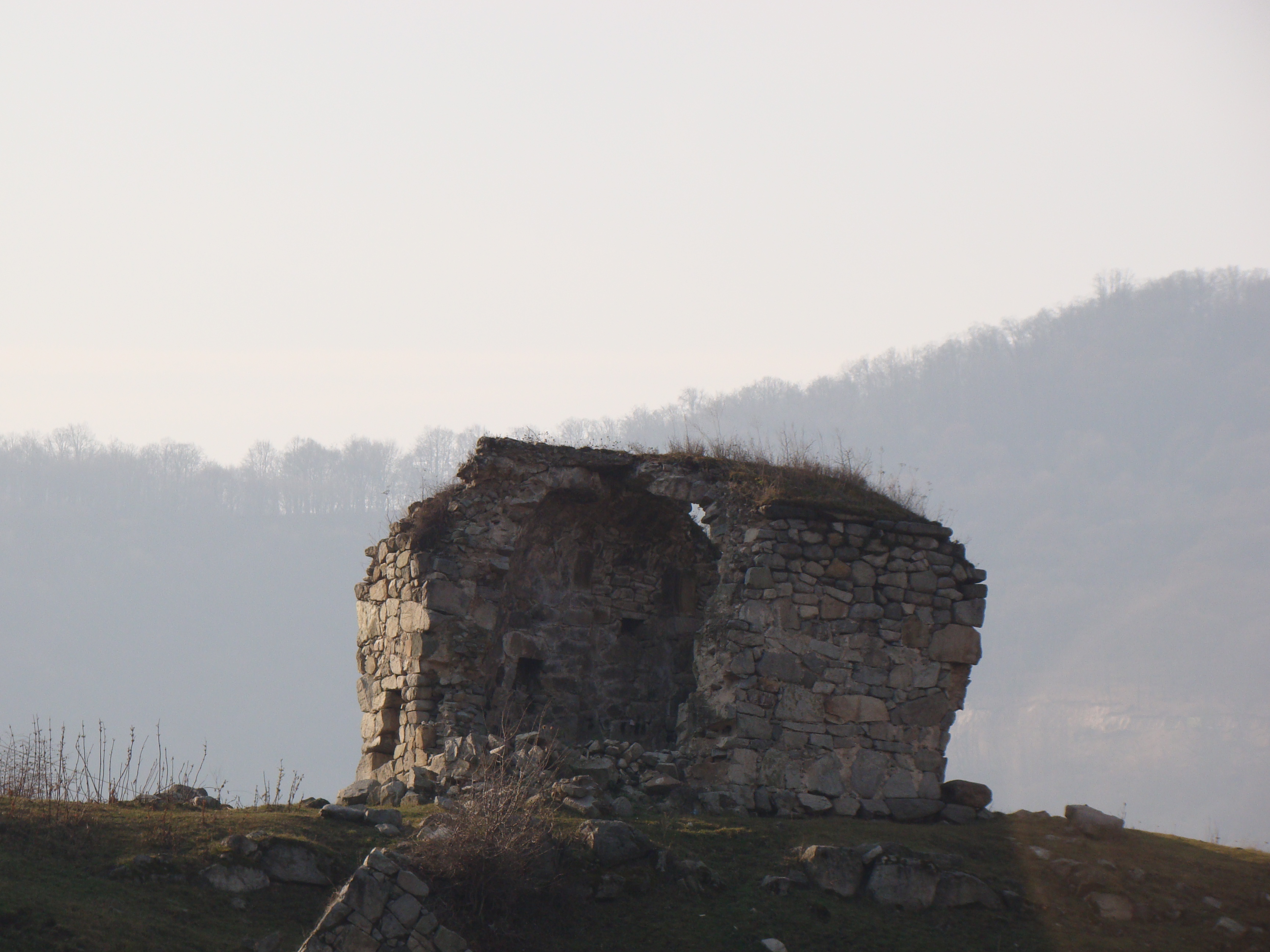
A cultural monument
2008 (administrative building)

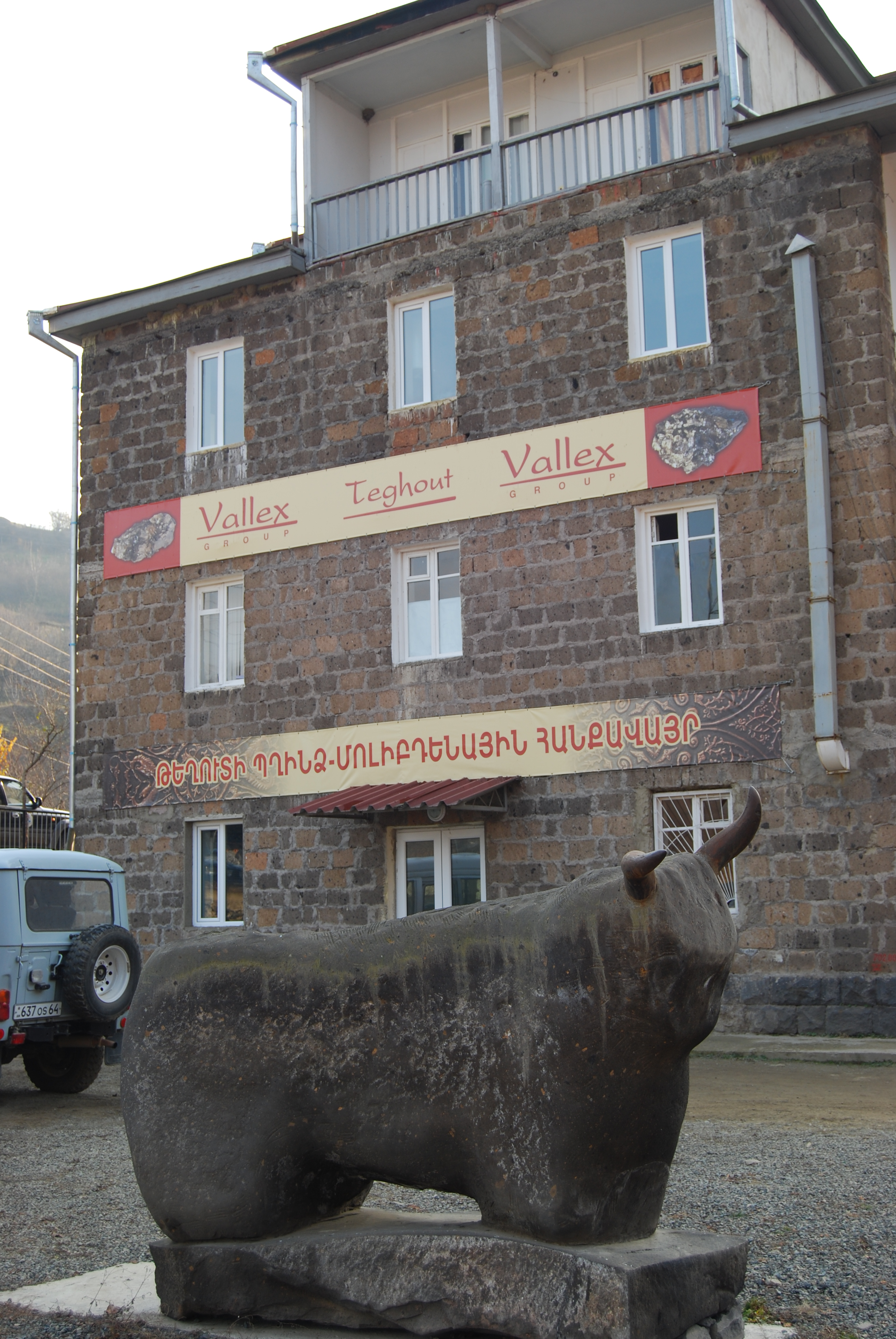
Administrative building

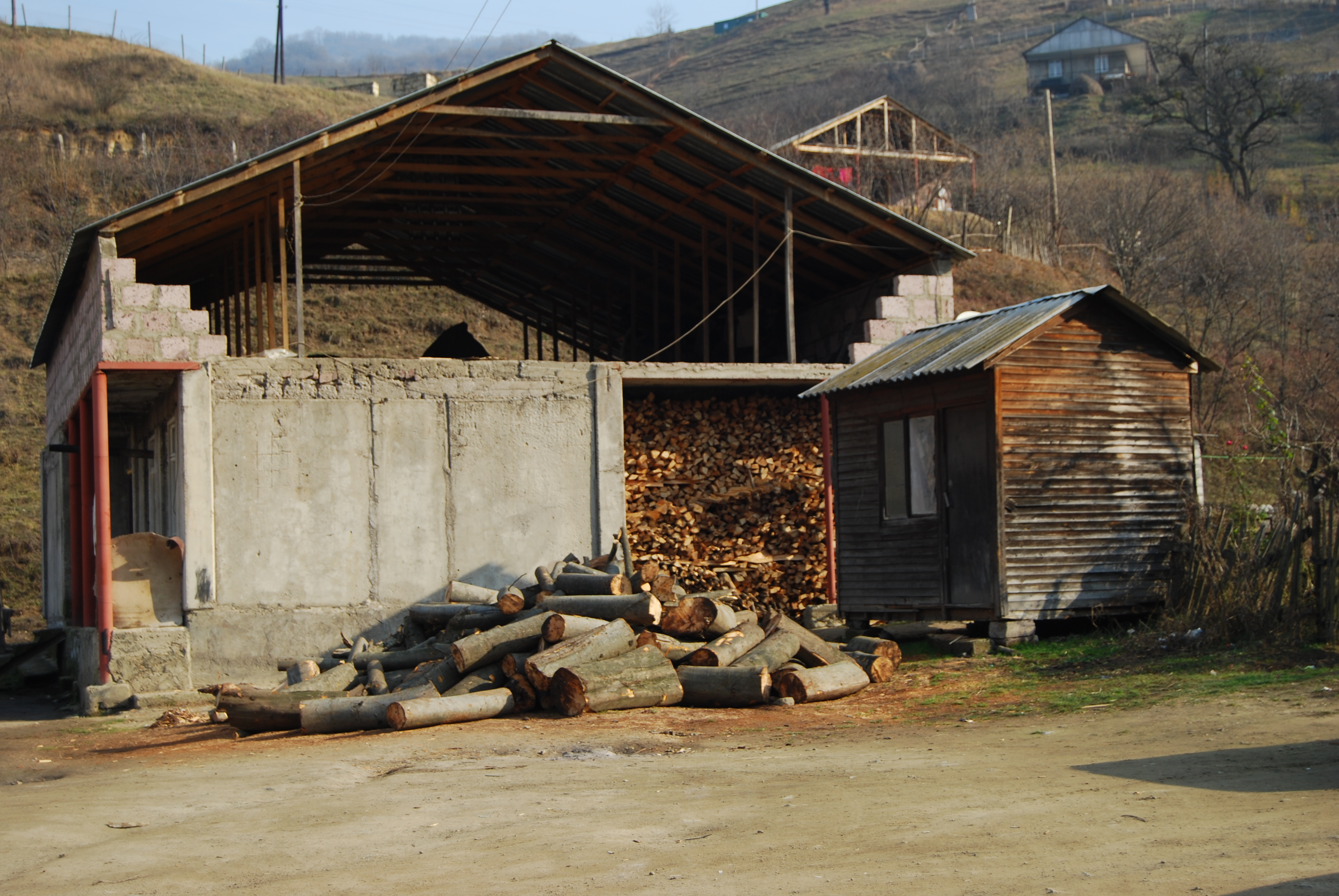
Log storage

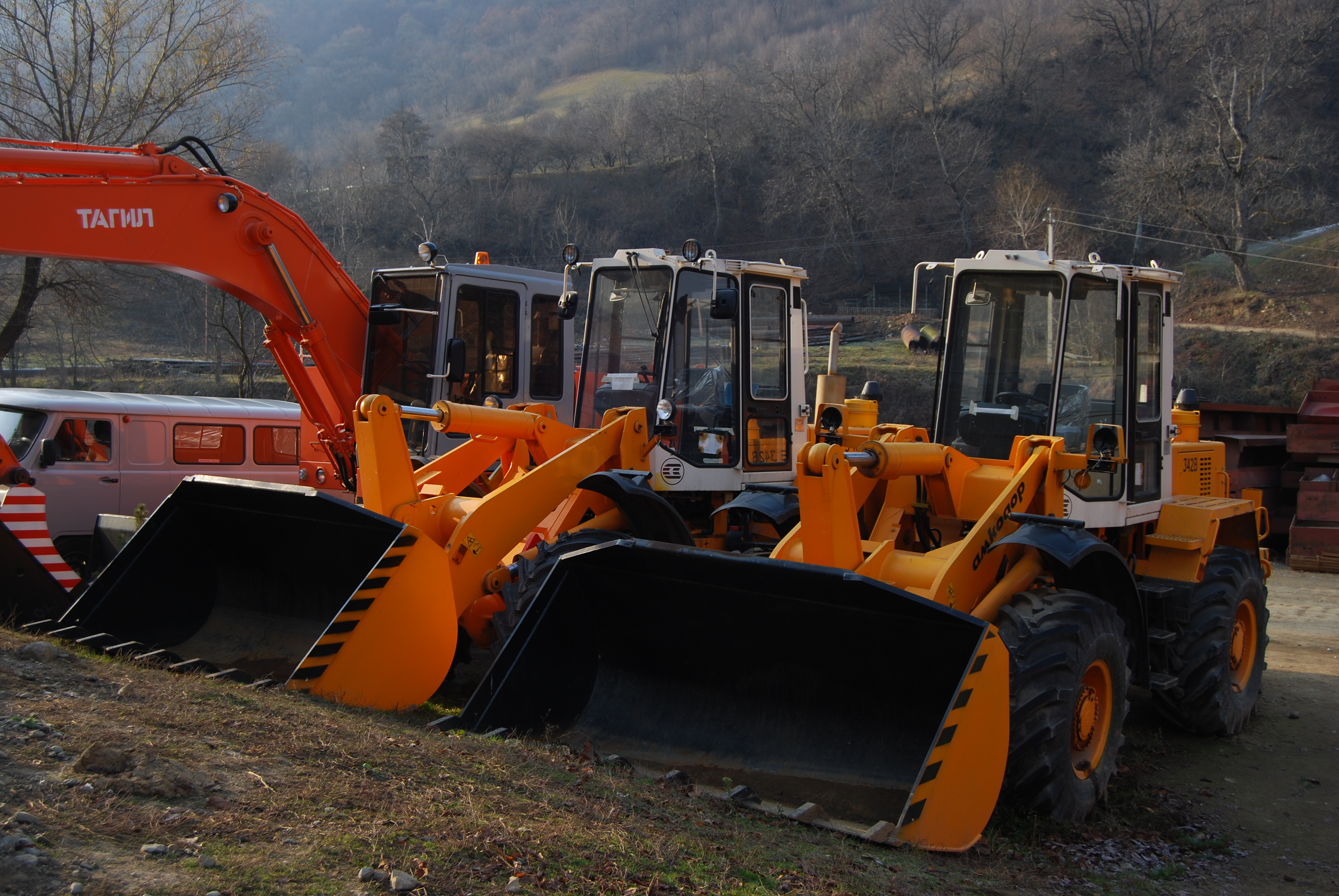
Heavy machinery

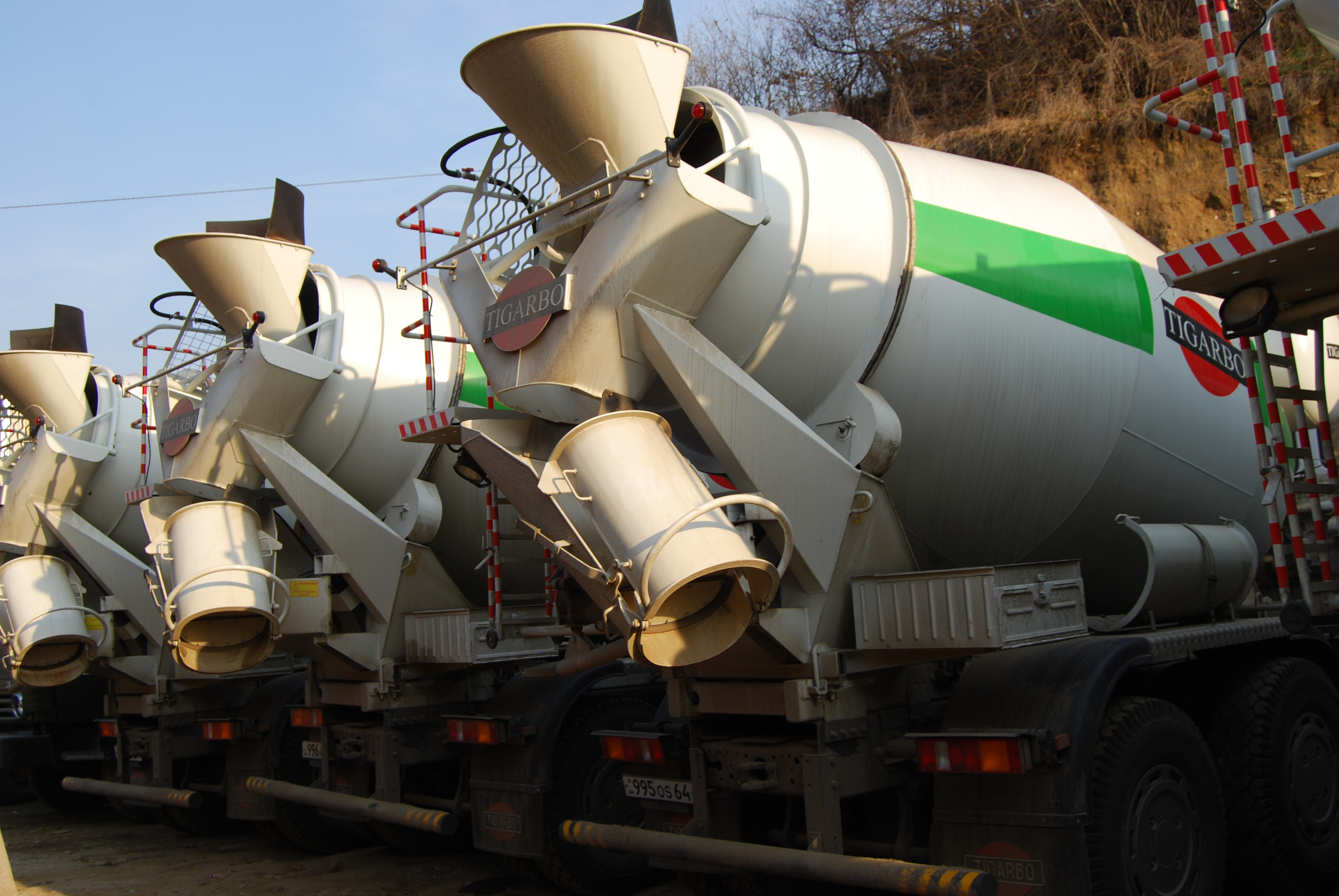
Cement trucks

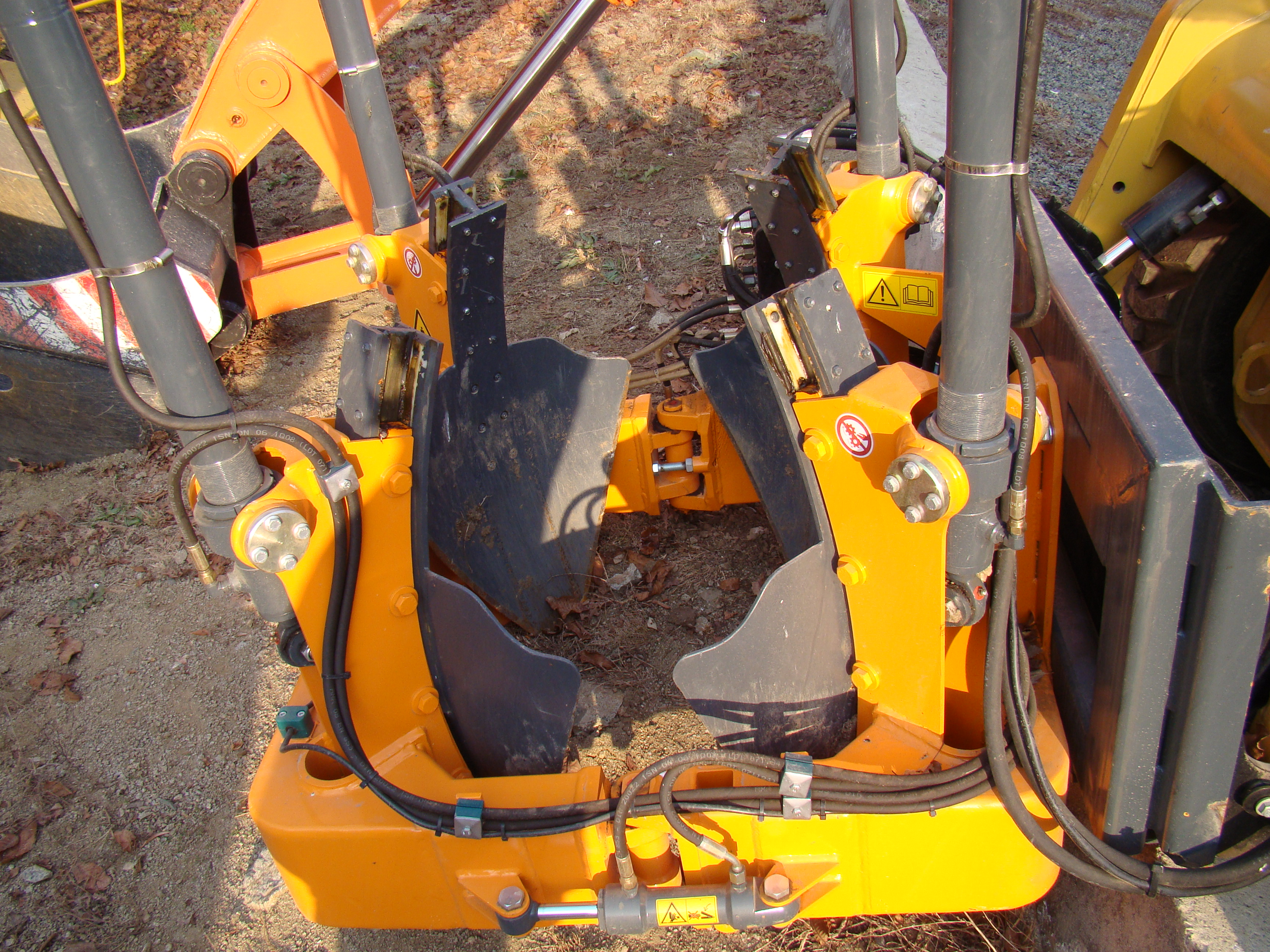
Tree cutting machinery

=== Panoramas from September 2013 ===
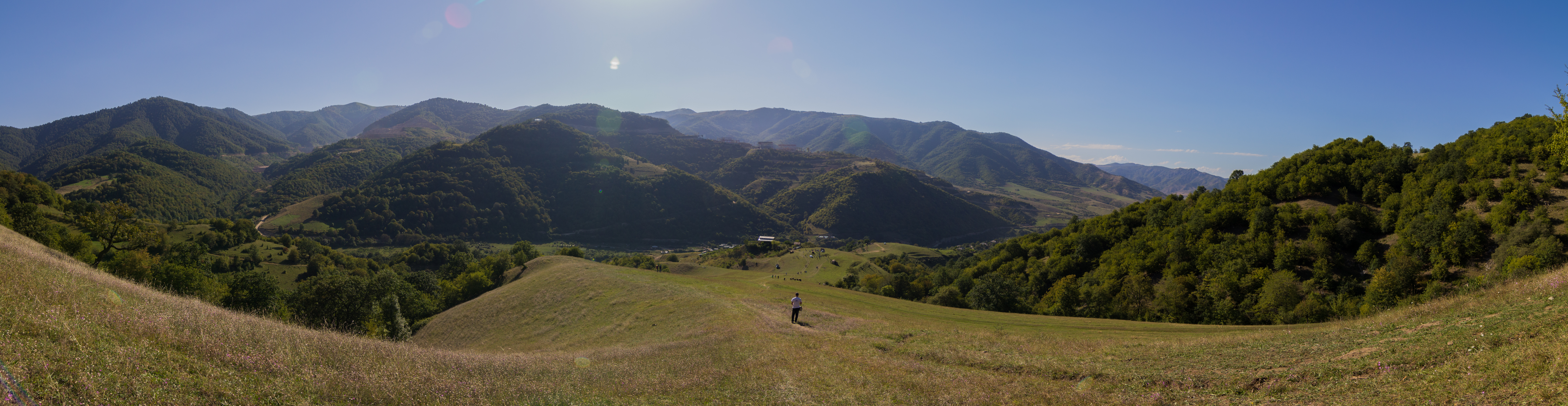
Teghut Valley and Mine. Visible are the location of the open pit mine and the ore processing facility under construction.
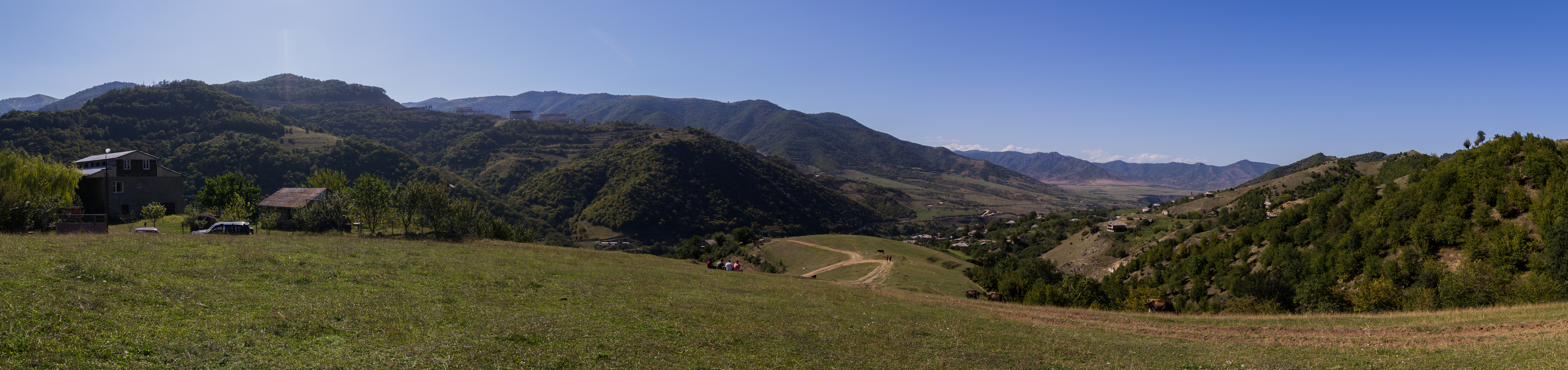
Western area: Teghut village and mine.
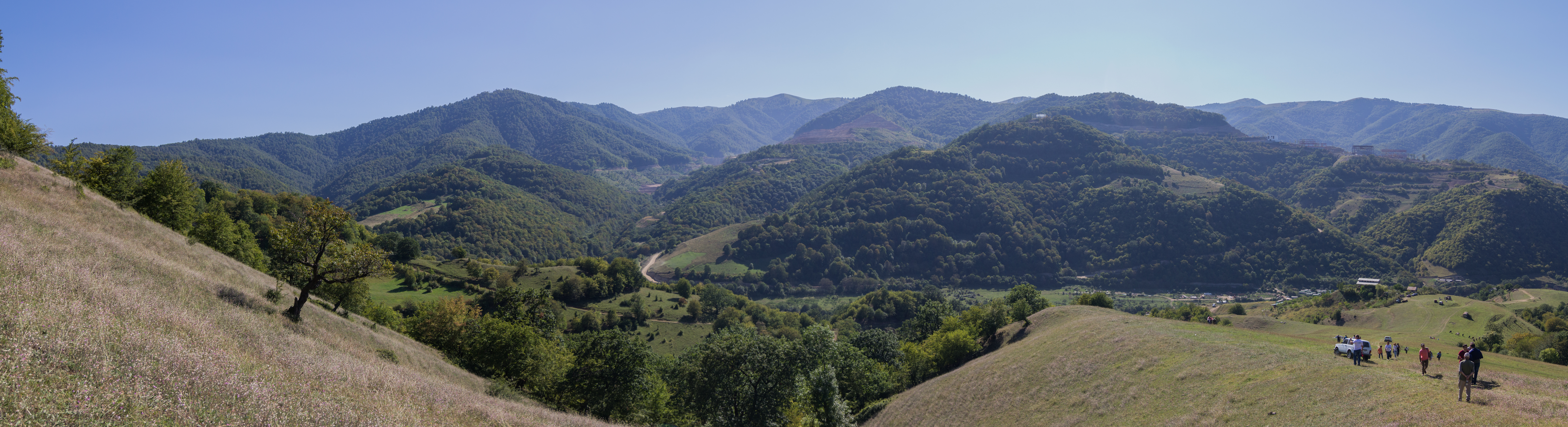
Eastern area: Teghut mine and forest
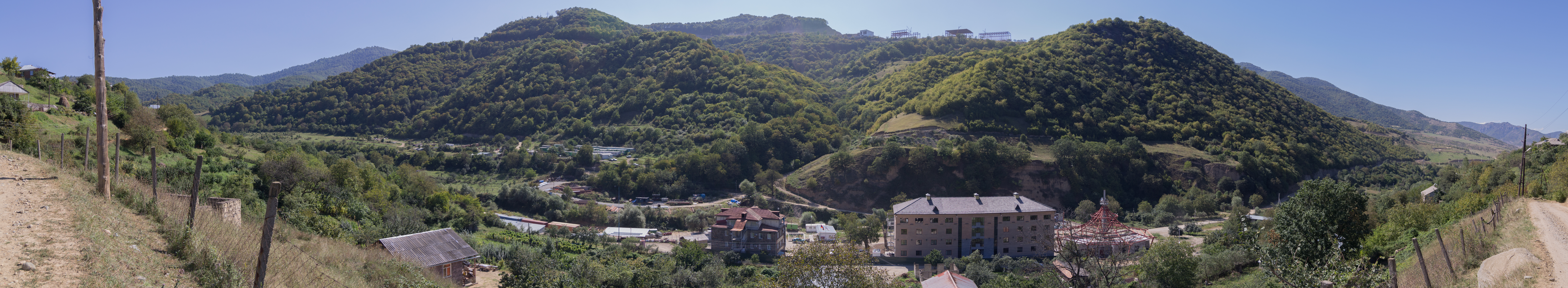
Panorama from main road a few kilometers up from the main entrance. The ore processing facility can be seen under construction on top of the hill, behind which is the tailing dump.
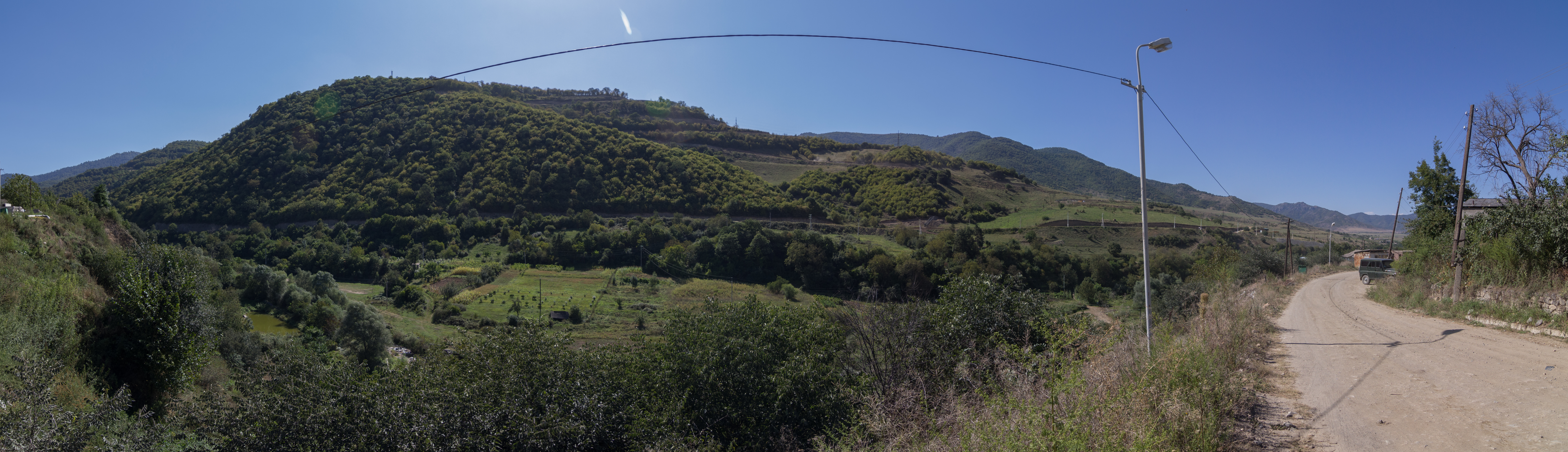
Panorama from main road a few kilometers up from the main entrance. The tailing dump is located behind the hill in the foreground.
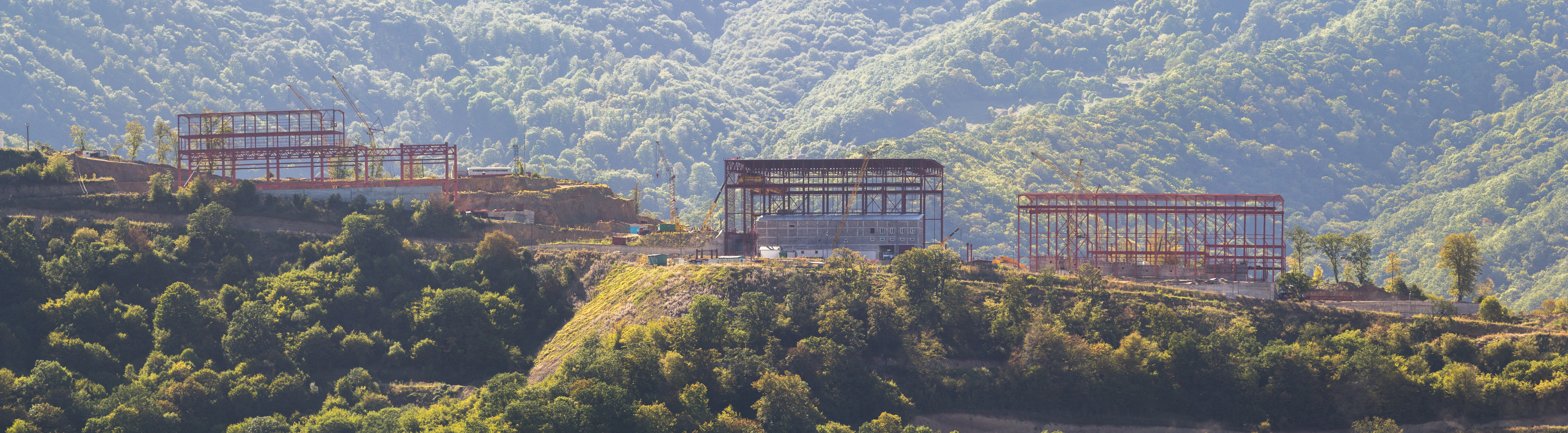
Ore processing facility under construction

== See also ==
- Mineral industry of Armenia
