= List of monasteries in Armenia =

This is a list of monasteries in Armenia.

== Monasteries ==
#	Image	Name	Date	Province	Location	Image
1	Հովհաննավանք Hovhannavank Monastery	Hovhannavank	4th-13th centuries	Aragatsotn Province	Ohanavan	Հովհաննավանք Hovhannavank khachkar
2	Սաղմոսավանք Saghmosavank Monastery	Saghmosavank	13th-18th centuries	Aragatsotn Province	Saghmosavan	Սաղմոսավանք Saghmosavank khachkar
3	Տեղերի վանք Tegher Monastery	Tegher Monastery	13th-15th centuries	Aragatsotn Province	Tegher	Տեղերի վանք Tegher
4	Մուղնու վանք Mughni Saint George Monastery	Saint Gevork Monastery of Mughni	14th-17th centuries	Aragatsotn Province	Mughni	Մուղնու վանք Saint-Georges de Moughni
5	Ուշիի Սուրբ Սարգիս վանք Ushi Saint Sarkis Monastery	Saint Sarkis Monastery of Ushi	5th-7th centuries	Aragatsotn Province	Ushi	Ուշիի Սուրբ Սարգիս վանք Saint-Serge d'Ushi Altar
6	Աղջոց Սուրբ Ստեփանոս վանք Aghjots Saint Stepanos Monastery	Aghjots Vank	12th-13th centuries	Ararat Province	Aghjots Village	Աղջոց Սուրբ Ստեփանոս վանք Aghjots Vank
7	Հավուց Թառ Havuts Tar Monastery	Havuts Tar	11th-18th centuries	Ararat Province	Havuts Tar Village	Հավուց Թառ Havuts Tar Monastery
8	Խոր Վիրապ Khor Virap Monastery	Khor Virap	17th-19th centuries	Ararat Province	Lusarat	Խոր Վիրապ Khor Virap Cellule
9	Զնջռլուի Սբ. Կարապետ Saint Karapet Monastery	Znjrlu Saint Karapet Monastery	14th century	Ararat Province	Lusashogh	Զնջռլուի Սբ. Կարապետ Saint- Karapet
10	Հայրավանք Hayravank Monastery	Hayravank Monastery	9th-13th centuries	Gegharkunik Province	Hayravank	Հայրավանք Hayravank khachkar
11	Մաքենյաց վանք Makenyats Monastery	Makenyats Vank	17th-19th centuries	Gegharkunik Province	Makenis	Մաքենյաց վանք Makenyats khachkar
12	Կարմիր վանք (Լճաշեն) Red Monastery in Lchashen village	Red Monastery in Lchashen village	9th-20th centuries	Gegharkunik Province	Lchashen	Կարմիր վանք (Լճաշեն) Karmir Vank en Lchashen khachkar
13	Սևանավանք Sevanavank Monastery	Sevanavank	9th-20th centuries	Gegharkunik Province	Sevan	Սևանավանք Sevanavank Armenaprkich khachkar
14	Շողագավանք Shoghagavank Monastery	Shoghagavank Monastery	5th-17th centuries	Gegharkunik Province	Dzoragyugh	Շողագավանք Shoghagavank khachkar
15	Վանեվանք Vanevank Monastery	Vanevan Monastery	10th-14th centuries	Gegharkunik Province	Artsvanist	Վանեվանք Vanevank khachkar
16	Սանահինի վանք Sanahin Monastery	Sanahin Monastery	10th-13th centuries	Lori Province	Alaverdi	Սանահինի վանք Sanahin Monasterykhachkar
17	Հաղպատավանք Haghpat Monastery	Haghpat Monastery	10th-20th centuries	Lori Province	Haghpat	Հաղպատավանք Haghpat Monastery
18	Քոբայրի վանք Kobayr Monastery	Kobayr monastery	12th-13th centuries	Lori Province	Kober kayaran	Քոբայրի վանք Kobayr
19	Մանստևի վանք Manstev Monastery	Manstev Monastery	12th-13th centuries	Lori Province	Teghut	Մանստևի վանք Manstev
20	Ախթալա (Պղնձահանքի վանք, Մարիամ Աննայի վանք, Մեյրիման) Akhtala Monastery	Akhtala Monastery	13th century	Lori Province	Akhtala	Ախթալա (Պղնձահանքի վանք, Մարիամ Աննայի վանք, Մեյրիման) Akhtala
21	Սուրբ Երրորդություն Saint Holy Trinity Monastery	Saint Holy Trinity Monastery in Akhtala	13th century	Lori Province	Akhtala	Սուրբ Երրորդություն Saint Yerrordutyun
22	Սբ. Հովհաննես (Սրբանես, Հովհան Օձնեցու վանք) Srbanes Monastery	Srbanes Monastery	8th-19th centuries	Lori Province	Ardvi	Սբ. Հովհաննես (Սրբանես, Հովհան Օձնեցու վանք) Srbanes Odzi port
23	Բարձրաքաշ Սուրբ Գրիգորի վանք Bardzrakash Monastery	Bardzrakash Monastery	10th-14th centuries	Lori Province	Dsegh	Բարձրաքաշ Սուրբ Գրիգորի վանք Bardzrakach
24	Քառասնից Մանկանց վանք Karasnits Mankants Monastery	Karasnits Mankants Monastery	11th-15th centuries	Lori Province	Dsegh	Քառասնից Մանկանց վանք Karasnits Mankants
25	Խուճապի վանք Khuchap Monastery	Khuchap Monastery	12th-13th centuries	Lori Province	Privolnoye	Խուճապի վանք Khuchap
26	Սեդվու Սբ. Նշան Sedvu Saint Nshan Monastery	Sedvu Saint Nshan Monastery	13th-14th centuries	Lori Province	Kachachkut	Սեդվու Սբ. Նշան Sedvu Saint-Nshan
27	Հնեվանք Hnevank Monastery	Hnevank	7th-12th century	Lori Province	Kurtan	Հնեվանք Hnevank
28	Հոռոմայրի Սբ. Նշան (վերին հուշարձանախումբ) Horomayr Monastery	Horomayr Monastery (upper)	13th century	Lori Province	Odzun	Հոռոմայրի Սբ. Նշան (վերին հուշարձանախումբ) Horomayr khachkar
29	Հոռոմայրի Սբ. Նշան (ստորին հուշարձանախումբ) Horomayr Monastery	Horomayr Monastery	10th-13th centuries	Lori Province	Odzun	Հոռոմայրի Սբ. Նշան (ստորին հուշարձանախումբ) Horomayr
30						
31	Նահատակի վանք Nahatak Monastery	Nahatak Monastery	1621	Lori Province	Chochkan	Նահատակի վանք Nahatak khachkar
32	Մաքրավանք Makravank Monastery	Makravank Monastery	10th-17th centuries	Kotayk Province	Hrazdan	Մաքրավանք Makravank gavit
33	Սուրբ Աջ վանք Saint Right Monastery	Saint Right Monastery	10th-14th centuriesies	Kotayk Province	Hrazdan	Սուրբ Աջ վանք Saint -Aj
34	Կեչառիս Kecharis Monastery	Kecharis Monastery	10th-13th century	Kotayk Province	Tsaghkadzor	Կեչառիս Ketcharisgavit
35	Ձագավանք Dzagavank	Dzagavank Monastery	7th-17th centuries	Kotayk Province	Arinj	Ձագավանք Dzagavank khachkar
36	Նեղուցի վանք (Արզականի վանք, Սբ. Աստվածածին, Նեղոց Սբ. Աստվածածին) Neghuts Monastery	Neghuts Monastery	10th-16th centuries	Kotayk Province	Arzakan	Նեղուցի վանք (Արզականի վանք, Սբ. Աստվածածին, Նեղոց Սբ. Աստվածածին) Neghuts
37	Թեղենյաց վանք Teghenyats Monastery	Teghenyats Monastery	7th-15th centuries	Kotayk Province	Buzhakan	Թեղենյաց վանք Teghenyats Vank Altar
38	Բջնո վանք Saint Holy Mother of God Monastery in Bjni	Saint Holy Mother of God Monastery in Bjni	11th-17th centuries	Kotayk Province	Bjni	Բջնո վանք Saint Holy Mother of God Monastery in Bjni
39	Գեղարդի վանք Geghard Monastery	Geghard	12th-20th centuries	Kotayk Province	Geghard	Գեղարդի վանք Geghard khachkar
40	Արտավազավանք (Անապատ, Արտավազա ապարանք, Արտավազդա ապարանք, Արտավազդավանք, Արտավազդա Սբ. Աստվածածին) Artavaz Monastery	Artavaz Monastery	6th-7th century	Kotayk Province	Artavaz	Արտավազավանք (Անապատ, Արտավազա ապարանք, Արտավազդա ապարանք, Արտավազդավանք, Արտավազդա Սբ. Աստվածածին) Artavazavank
41	Կարենիս (Մաթևոս և Անդրեաս առաքյալների վանք) Karenis Monastery	Karenis Monastery	6th-7th centuries	Kotayk Province	Karenis	Կարենիս (Մաթևոս և Անդրեաս առաքյալների վանք) KarenisavankKarenisavank
42	Թեժառույքի վանք (Գյուրջիքիլիսա, Թուխ Մանուկ) Tezharuyk Monastery	Tezharuyk Monastery	12th-13th centuries	Kotayk Province	Meghradzor	Թեժառույքի վանք (Գյուրջիքիլիսա, Թուխ Մանուկ) Tezharuyk
43	Քոսաղբյուրի Ամենափրկիչ վանք Qosaghbyur Monastery	Kosaghbyur Monastery	5th-15th centuries	Kotayk Province	Jrvezh	Քոսաղբյուրի Ամենափրկիչ վանք Kosaghbyur
44	Մայրավանք Mayravank Monastery	Mayravank Monastery	7th-14th centuries	Kotayk Province	Solak	Մայրավանք Mayravank
45		Tiv Tiv Monastery	7th century	Kotayk Province	Kanakeravan	
46	Լմբատավանք Lmbatavank Monastery	Lmbatavank	4th-14th centuries	Shirak Province	Artik	Լմբատավանք Lmbatavank Monastery
47	Հառիճի վանք Harich Monastery	Harichavank Monastery	7th-13th centuries	Shirak Province	Harich	Հառիճի վանք Haritchavank
48	Մարմաշենի վանք Marmashen Monastery	Marmashen Monastery	9th-13th centuries	Shirak Province	Vahramaberd	Մարմաշենի վանք Marmashen Altar
49	Հոգեվանք Hogevank Monastery	Hogevank Monastery	5th-13th centuries	Shirak Province	Sarnaghbyur	Հոգեվանք Hogevank khachkar
50	Առաքելոց (Պեմզաշեն) Arakelots Monastery (Pemzashen)	Arakelots Monastery (Pemzashen)	10th-18th centuries	Shirak Province	Pemzashen	Առաքելոց (Պեմզաշեն) Arakelots Monastery (Pemzashen)
51	Մակարավանք (Պեմզաշեն) Makaravank Monastery (Pemzashen)	Makaravank Monastery (Pemzashen)	11th century	Shirak Province	Pemzashen	Մակարավանք (Պեմզաշեն) Makaravank Monastery (Pemzashen)
52	Վահանավանք Vahanavank Monastery	Vahanavank	10th-11th centuries	Syunik Province	Kapan	Վահանավանք Vahanavank
53	Բեխի Անապատ Bekhi Anapat	Bekh Monastery	10th-11th centuries	Syunik Province	Kapan	
54	Kusanats Anapat Կուսանաց Անապատ	Kusanats Anapat (Alvank)	17th-18th centuries	Syunik Province	Alvanq	Kusanats Anapat Կուսանաց Անապատ
55	Որոտնավանք Vorotnavank Monastery	Vorotnavank	10th-11th centuries	Syunik Province	Vaghatin	Որոտնավանք Vorotnavank Monastery khachkar
56	Բղենո-Նորավանք Bgheno-Noravank Monastery	Bgheno-Noravank	936-1062	Syunik Province	Bardzravan	Բղենո-Նորավանք Bgheno-Noravank
57	Երիցավանք Yeritsavank Monastery	Yeritsavank Monastery	6th-11th centuries	Syunik Province	Artsvanik	Երիցավանք Yeritsavank Monastery
58		Harants Anapat Monastery	1608-1613	Syunik Province	Halidzor	
59	Տաթևի Մեծ Անապատ Tatevi Mets Anapat Monastery	Tatevi Anapat	17th-18th centuries	Syunik Province	Tatev	Տաթևի Մեծ Անապատ Tatevi Anapat
60	Տաթևի վանք Tatev Monastery	Tatev monastery	9th-20th centuries	Syunik Province	Tatev	Tatev
61		Kusanats Anapat Monastery (Shinuhayr)	17th century	Syunik Province	Shinuhayr	
62	Արատեսի վանք Arates Monastery	Arates Monastery	10th-13th centuries	Vayots Dzor Province	Arates	Արատեսի վանք Aratesi vank
63	Նորավանք Noravank Monastery	Noravank	12th-17th centuries	Vayots Dzor Province	Amaghu	Նորավանք Noravank
64	Ցախաց Քար Tsakhats Kar Monastery	Tsakhats Kar Monastery	9th-14th centuries	Vayots Dzor Province	Artabuynk	Ցախաց Քար Tsaghatskar
65	Սպիտակավոր Սբ. Աստվածածին (Բոլորաբերդի անապատ, Գյուլվանք) Spitakavor Monastery	Spitakavor Monastery	1321	Vayots Dzor Province	Gladzor	Սպիտակավոր Սբ. Աստվածածին (Բոլորաբերդի անապատ, Գյուլվանք) Spitakavor
66	Գնդեվանք Gndevank Monastery	Gndevank	10th-17th centuries	Vayots Dzor Province	Gndevaz	Գնդեվանք Gndevank
67	Հերմոնի վանքը (Կնեվանք) Hermon Monastery	Hermon Monastery	10th-17th centuries	Vayots Dzor Province	Yeghegis	Հերմոնի վանքը (Կնեվանք) Hermoni vank
68	«Ճգնավորի քար անապատ» («Գյոլում բուլաղ») Chgnavori Kar Anapat Monastery	Chgnavori Kar Anapat Monastery	13th-18th centuries	Vayots Dzor Province	Yeghegis	«Ճգնավորի քար անապատ» («Գյոլում բուլաղ») Chgnavori Kar Anapat
69	Քարեվանք Karevank Monastery	Karevank Monastery	9th-10th centuries	Vayots Dzor Province	Yeghegis	Քարեվանք Karevank
70	Քարկոփի Սբ. Աստվածածին (Խոտակերաց վանք) Khotakerats Monastery	Khotakerats Monastery	10th-13th centuries	Vayots Dzor Province	Khachik	Քարկոփի Սբ. Աստվածածին (Խոտակերաց վանք) Khotakerats vank
71	Սբ. Սիոն Saint Sion Monastery	Saint Sion Monastery	10th-13th centuries	Vayots Dzor Province	Herher	Սբ. Սիոն Saint Sion vank Amenaprkich khachkar
72	Շատիվանք (Շատանյա վանք, Շատինի վանք, Շատիկո անապատ) Shativank Monastery	Shativank Monastery	10th-17th centuries	Vayots Dzor Province	Shatin	Շատիվանք (Շատանյա վանք, Շատինի վանք, Շատիկո անապատ) Shativank
73	Սուրբ Մամաս վանք Saint Mamas Monastery	Saint Mamas Monastery	13th-14th centuries	Vayots Dzor Province	Salli	Սուրբ Մամաս վանք Saint Mamas vank
74	Թանահատի վանք (Թանադե վանք, Գարավանք) Tanahat Monastery	Tanahat Monastery	13th-14th centuries	Vayots Dzor Province	Vernashen	Թանահատի վանք (Թանադե վանք, Գարավանք) Tanahat
75		Monastery complex in Ijevan	10th-12th centuries	Tavush Province	Ijevan	
76	Ջուխտակ (Գիշերավանք, Պետրոսի վանք) Jukhtak Monastery	Jukhtak Vank	12th-13th centuries	Tavush Province	Dilijan	Ջուխտակ (Գիշերավանք, Պետրոսի վանք) Jukhtak Monastery
77	Մաթոսավանք Matosavank Monastery	Matosavank	13th century	Tavush Province	Dilijan	Մաթոսավանք Matosavank Monastery gavit
78	Սամսոն Samson Monastery	Samsonavank Monastery	12th-13th centuries	Tavush Province	Acharkut	Սամսոն Samson Monastery
79	Դեղձուտի վանք Deghdznut Monastery	Deghdznut Monastery	10th-17th centuries	Tavush Province	Acharkut	Դեղձուտի վանք Deghdznut khachkar
80	Առաքելոց վանք Arakelots Monastery	Arakelots Monastery, Kirants	13th-14th centuries	Tavush Province	Acharkut	Առաքելոց վանք Arakelots Monastery khachkar
81	Սրվեղի վանք Srvegh Monastery	Srvegh Monastery	13th-14th centuries	Tavush Province	Aygehovit	Սրվեղի վանք Srvegh
82	Մակարավանք Makaravank Monastery	Makaravank	10th-13th centuries	Tavush Province	Achajur	Մակարավանք Makaravank
83	Նոր Գետիկ (Գոշավանք) Goshavank Monastery	Goshavank	12th-13th centuries	Tavush Province	Gosh	Նոր Գետիկ (Գոշավանք) Gochavank Monastery khachkar
84		Saint Sarkis Monastery in Dovegh	16th-19th centuries	Tavush Province	Dovegh	
85	Շխմուրադի վանք Shkhmurad Monastery	Shkhmurad Monastery	12th-13th centuries	Tavush Province	Verin Tsaghkavan	Շխմուրադի վանք Shkhmurad khachkar
86	Կիրանց վանք Kirants Monastery	Kirants Monastery	13th century	Tavush Province	Kirants	Կիրանց վանք Kirants
87	Մշկավանք (Մշակավանք) Mshkavank Monastery	Mshkavank Monastery	12th-13th centuries	Tavush Province	Koghb	Մշկավանք (Մշակավանք) Mshkavank khachkar
88	Հաղարծնի վանք Haghartsin Monastery	Haghartsin Monastery	10th-13th centuries	Tavush Province	Haghartsin	Հաղարծնի վանք Haghartsin Monastery
89	Խորանաշատ Khoranashat Monastery	Khoranashat Monastery	13th century	Tavush Province	Chinari	Խորանաշատ Khoranashat Monastery
90	Նոր Վարագավանք (Անապատ) Nor Varagavank Monastery	Nor Varagavank	13th century	Tavush Province	Varagavan	Նոր Վարագավանք (Անապատ) Nor Varagavank khachkar

== Temples and church complex ==
#	Image	Name	Date	Province	Location	Image
1	Քասախի Բազիլիկ Basilica of the Holy Cross	Kasagh Basilica	4th-5th century	Aragatsotn Province	Aparan	Քասախի Բազիլիկ Basilica of the Holy Cross
2	Թալինի Կաթողիկե Cathedral of Talin	Cathedral of Talin	4th-20th century	Aragatsotn Province	Talin	Թալինի Կաթողիկե Cathedral of Talin
3	Սբ. Գրիգոր (Արուճի Կաթողիկե) Aruchavank	Aruchavank	5th-7th century	Aragatsotn Province	Aruch	Սբ. Գրիգոր (Արուճի Կաթողիկե) Aruchavank
4	Աստվածընկալ վանք Astvatsynkal Monastery	Astvatsynkal Monastery	5th-13th century	Aragatsotn Province	Hartavan	Աստվածընկալ վանք Astvatsynkal Monastery
5	Եղիպատրուշ եկեղեցի Yeghipatrush Monastery	Yeghipatrush Monastery	13th century	Aragatsotn Province	Yeghipatrush	Եղիպատրուշ եկեղեցի Yeghipatrush Monastery
6	Սուրբ Մեսրոպ Մաշտոց եկեղեցի (Օշական) Saint Mesrop Mashtots Cathedral	Saint Mesrop Mashtots Cathedral	1875	Aragatsotn Province	Oshakan	Սուրբ Մեսրոպ Մաշտոց եկեղեցի (Օշական) Saint Mesrop Mashtots Cathedral
7	Զվարթնոց Zvartnots	Zvartnots	5th-7th century	Armavir Province	Vagharshapat	Զվարթնոց Zvartnots
8	Էջմիածնի Մայր Տաճար Etchmiadzin Cathedral	Etchmiadzin Cathedral	303	Armavir Province	Vagharshapat	Էջմիածնի Մայր Տաճար Etchmiadzin Cathedral
9	Սուրբ Գայանե եկեղեցի Saint Gayane Church	Saint Gayane Church	630	Armavir Province	Vagharshapat	Սուրբ Գայանե եկեղեցի Saint Gayane Church
10	Սուրբ Հռիփսիմե եկեղեցի (Էջմիածին) Saint Hripsime Church	Saint Hripsime Church	618	Armavir Province	Vagharshapat	Սուրբ Հռիփսիմե եկեղեցի (Էջմիածին) Saint Hripsime Church

== See also ==
- List of castles in Armenia
- List of caravanserais in Armenia
- The book Armenian Spiritual Sanctuaries by Prof. Dr. Lems Nersisyan offers a philosophical and visual exploration of Armenia’s sacred monastic heritage, blending art, architecture, and spiritual memory to highlight the enduring cultural significance of its monasteries.
