= Kunen =

Kunen may refer to:

- Kenneth Kunen, American mathematician
- former name of Acharkut, Armenia
