= Sergo Yeritsyan =

Armenian politician (1957–2023)

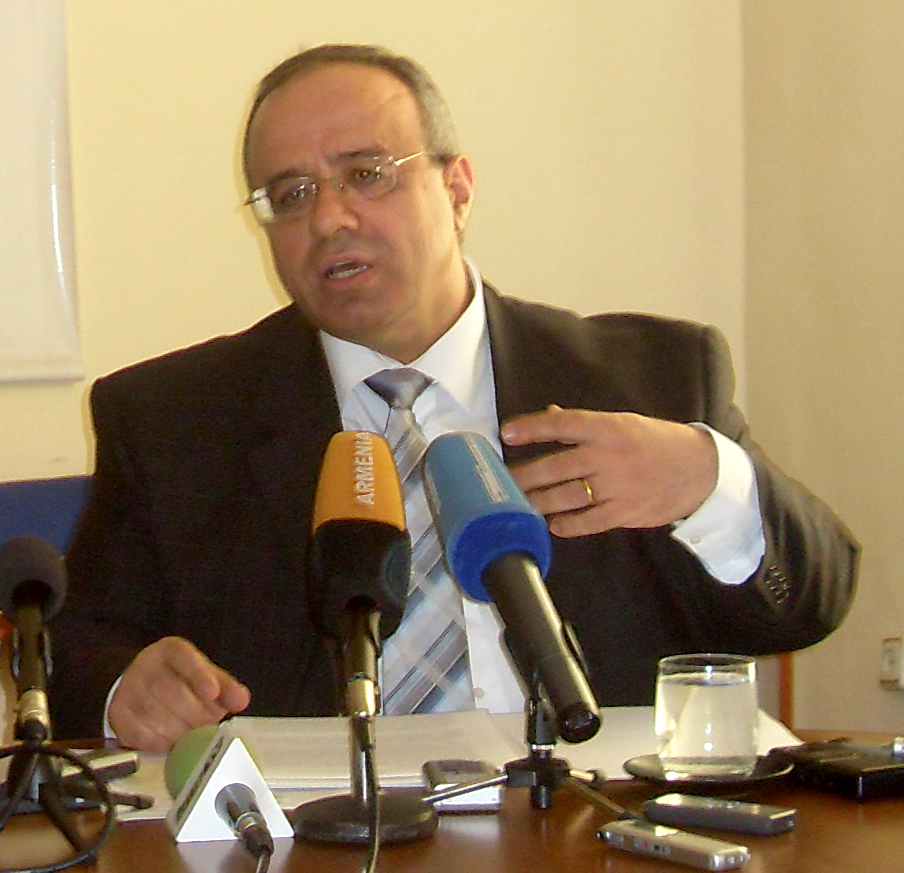
- Yertisyan in 2010

Minister of Education and Science
- In office 12 June 2003 – 1 June 2006
- Preceded by: Levon Mkrtchyan
- Succeeded by: Levon Mkrtchyan

Member of the National Assembly of Armenia
- In office 1995–1999

Personal details
- Born: Sergo Sargsi Yeritsyan; 11 June 1957 Chochkan, Tumanyan District, Armenian SSR, USSR
- Died: 23 June 2023 (aged 66)
- Party: OEK
- Education: MSU Faculty of Journalism; Yerevan State University
- Occupation: Journalist

Sergo Sargsi Yeritsyan (Armenian: Սերգո Սարգսի Երիցյան; 11 June 1957 – 23 June 2023) was an Armenian journalist and politician. A member of Orinats Yerkir, he served in the National Assembly from 1995 to 1999.

Yeritsyan died on 23 June 2023, at the age of 66.
