= Teghut, Lori =

Teghut Թեղուտ
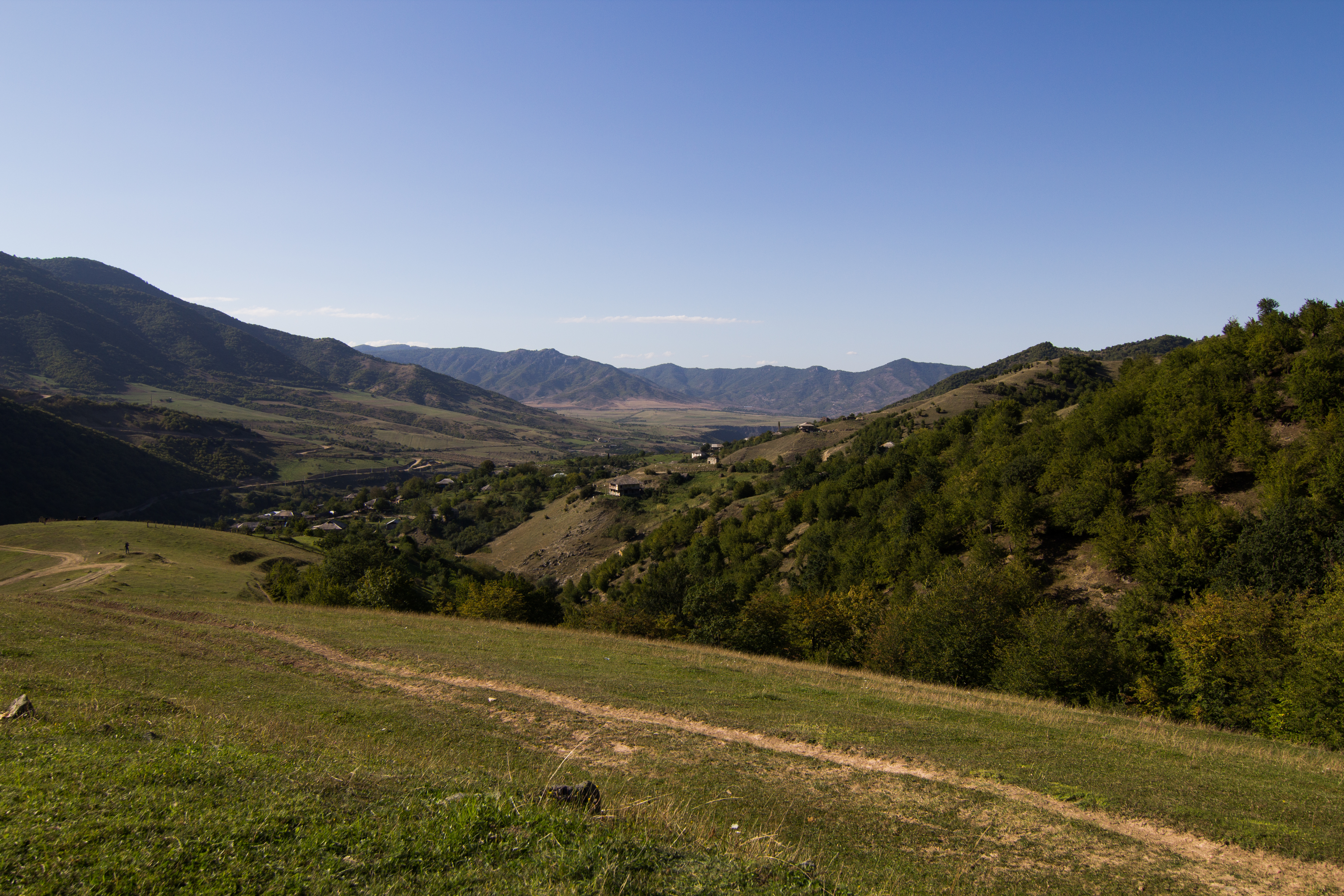
- General view in September 2013

- Location within Armenia
- Coordinates: 41°07′05″N 44°50′45″E
- Country: Armenia
- Marz (Province): Lori
- Elevation: 750 m (2,460 ft)

Population (2011)
  - Total: 684
- Time zone: UTC+4 ( )
  - Summer (DST): UTC+5

Teghut (Armenian: Թեղուտ), is a village in the Lori Province of Armenia.

Teghut is located 70 kilometers northeastward from Vanadzor. The village is at the right side of Shnogh river, which is the stream of Debed river, 18 kilometers from Alaverdi in a timbered area. Teghut was established by residents of Shnogh village at the beginning of the 20th century. Some of villagers' ancestors are Lori region aboriginals, others came from Artsakh, Javakheti, Syunik, Sevan in 17th-18th centuries. The village is named Teghut in connection with an old village in the central part of present-day Teghut which was plundered by Lezgins. The residents of the old village were captured and murdered. Other villages located near the Shnogh river had the same fortune (Dukanadzor, Dzorigegh, Giligegh, Manstev, Akhetk).

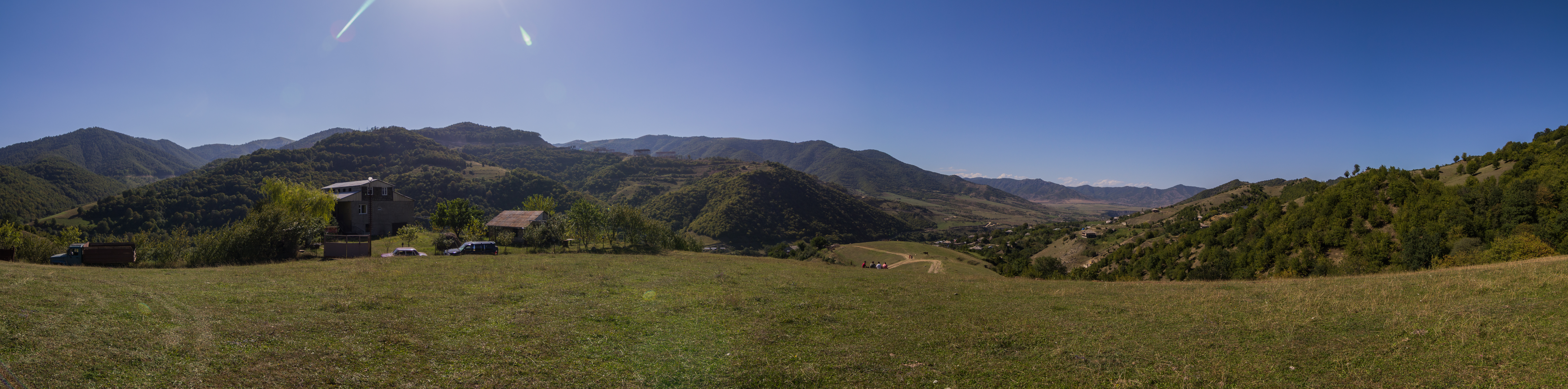
Panoramic view of the forest surrounding Teghut in September 2013, with the controversial copper and molybdenum mine in the distance

== See also ==
- Teghut Mine
- Shnogh village
