= Nor Varagavank =

13th-century Armenian Apostolic Church in Varagavan, Tavush Province, Armenia

- Նոր Վարագավանք
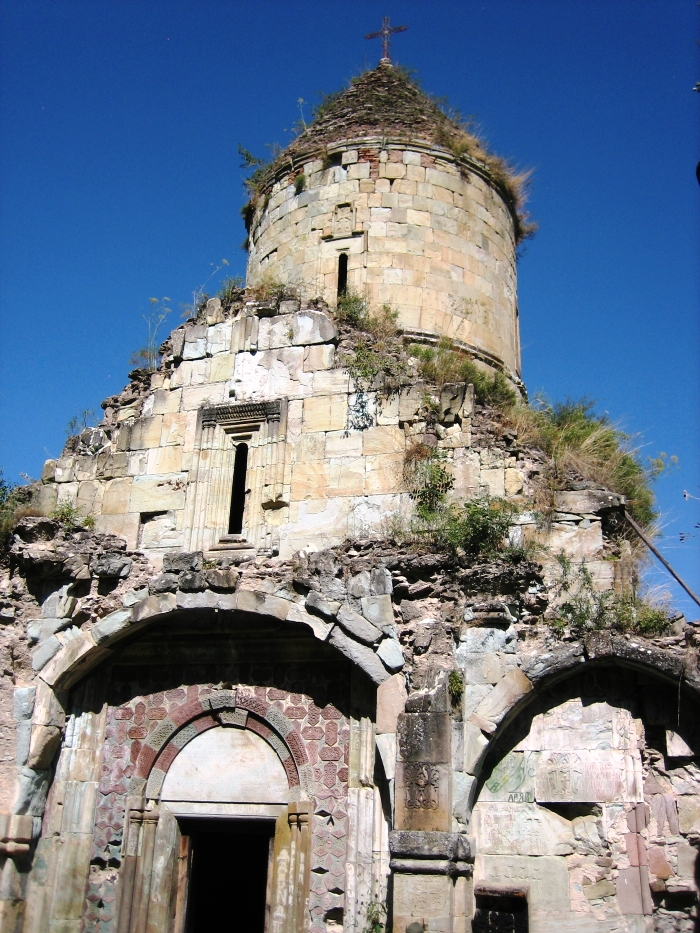
- Nor Varagavank

- Location within Armenia Location within Tavush

Religion
- Affiliation: Armenian Apostolic Church

Location
- Location: Near Varagavan, Tavush Province, Armenia
- Coordinates: 40.925°N 45.2018°E

Architecture
- Style: Armenian
- Completed: 12th-14th centuries

Nor Varagavank (Armenian: Նոր Վարագավանք) is a 13th-century Armenian Apostolic Church monastic ensemble situated 3.5 km southwest of the village Varagavan in the Tavush Province of Armenia. The monastery is situated upon a high hill and is surrounded by forested mountains and picturesque ravines.

== History and architecture ==
The monastic complex was established by King David II Kyurikian of northern Armenia in 1193-1198 and expanded by his grandson Vasak II in 1224–1237. The Kyurikians were a junior branch of Armenia's aristocratic Bagratuni family, whose domain, known as the Kingdom of Tashir-Dzoraget, spanned medieval Armenia's provinces of Gugark, Artsakh and Utik. The monastery was center of a bishopric, and played an important role in the ecclesiastical life of medieval Armenia. The monastery also served as Kyurikian's family burial vault and mausoleum.

In early sources the monastic ensemble was called Anapat (hermitage). It was renamed Nor Varagavank (meaning “New Varagavank”) when Vaspurakan's famed Varagavank monastery in Western Armenia near the Lake Van was threatened by the Mongols. Varagavank's Patriarch Ghukas brought to Anapat holy relics from Vaspurakan in 1213, such as a piece of the True Cross brought to Armenia by the holy virgins Hripsime and Gayane.

The most important structure of the complex is the church of the Holy Virgin. According to the inscriptions on its walls and information provided by the Armenian 13th-century historian Kirakos Gandzaketsi, it was built in 1224–1237 by David's grandson Vasak II Kyurikian, and was consecrated in 1240. The church of the Holy Virgin was designed by the architect Hovhan who came from the Armenian capital city of Ani. The church is rectangular from the outside (10.25 m x 15.40 m) and cruciform from the inside. The church has two entrances. The western entrance differs by its magnificent reliefs carved on multi-colored stones of the walls.

The Surb Nshan (Holy Sign) chapel is situated in the southeastern part of the monastic complex. It is the most ancient structure of the ensemble. The chapel has two apses. It also had a vaulted gabled roof, which has not been preserved. On both sides of the western entry stand two splendidly ornamented khachkars. The apses are illuminated by two windows on the eastern façade. They are joined by common belt, with relief images of animals and stylized vegetable decor.

Superbly-carved medieval khachkars can be found in various parts of the complex. Especially noteworthy among them is a big khachkar standing near the vestibule of the church of the Holy Virgin. It was created by master Vardan in 1620.

Nor Varagavank is known to have hosted Archbishop Hovhanes Tvetsi, an important Armenian religious and cultural figure of the 13th century who built the main the Holy Virgin church's narthex between 1237 and 1261. In the beginning of the 19th century, the monastery was headed by Grigor Manucharian, who in 1804–1828, together with a detachment of armed volunteers under his command, took an active part in freeing Eastern Armenia from foreign rule.

== Gallery ==
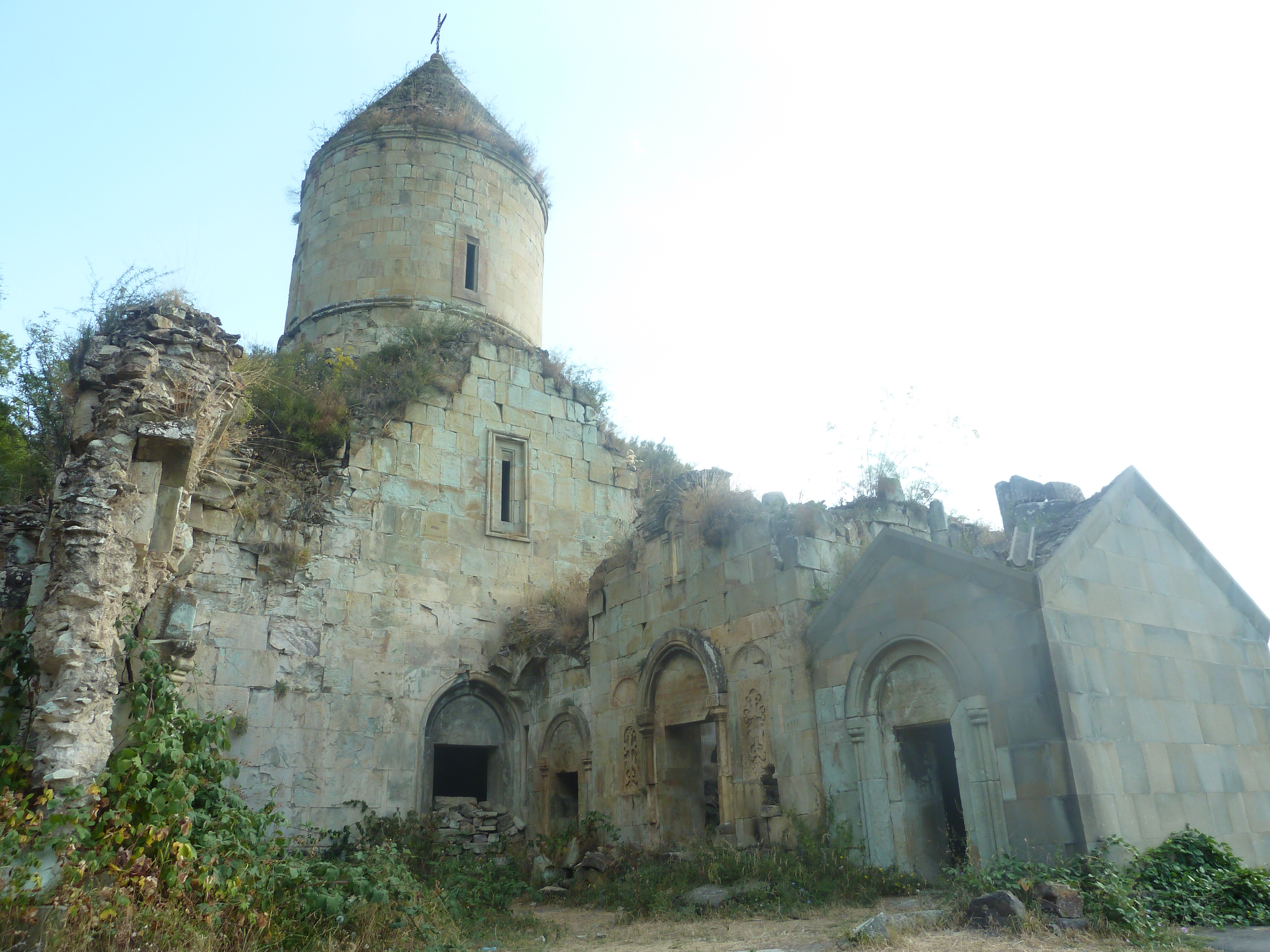
Nor Varagavank

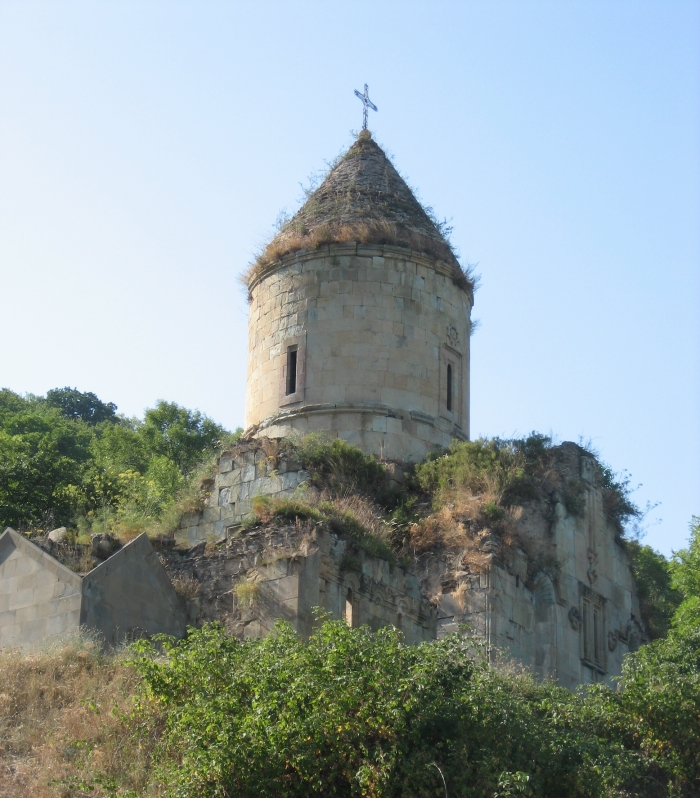
Church of the Mother-of-God (Holy Virgin) of Nor Varagavank

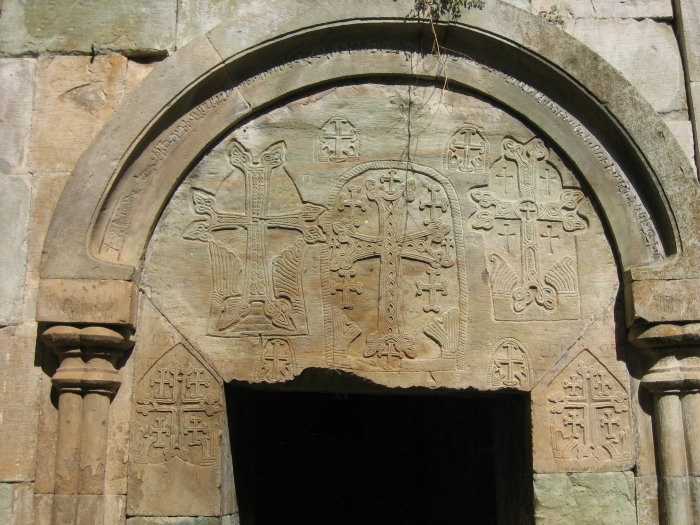
Portal of the Church of the Mother-of-God with engraved crosses

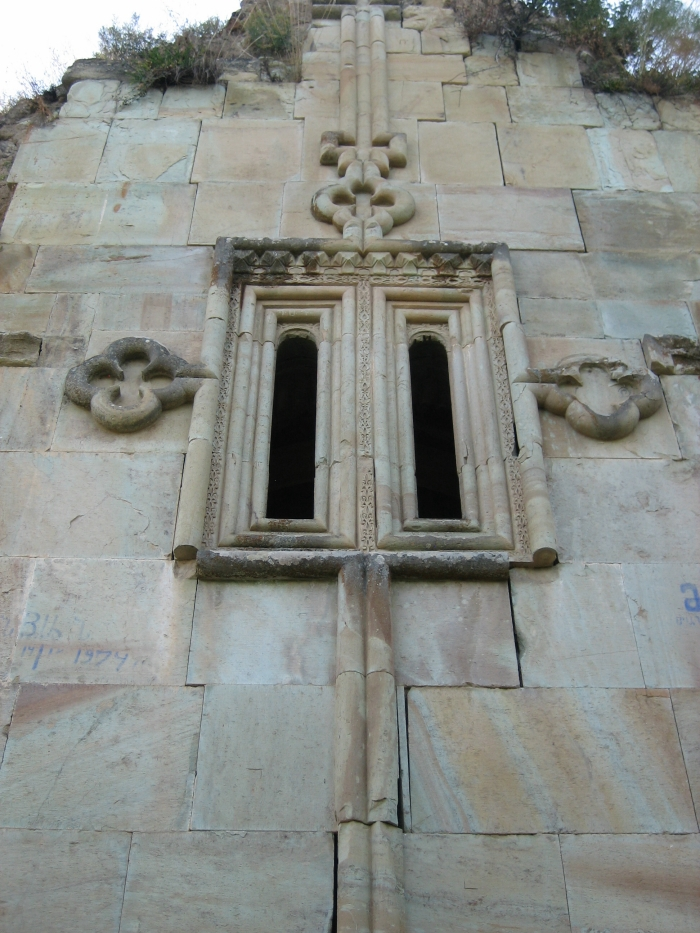
Facade of the Church of the Mother-of-God

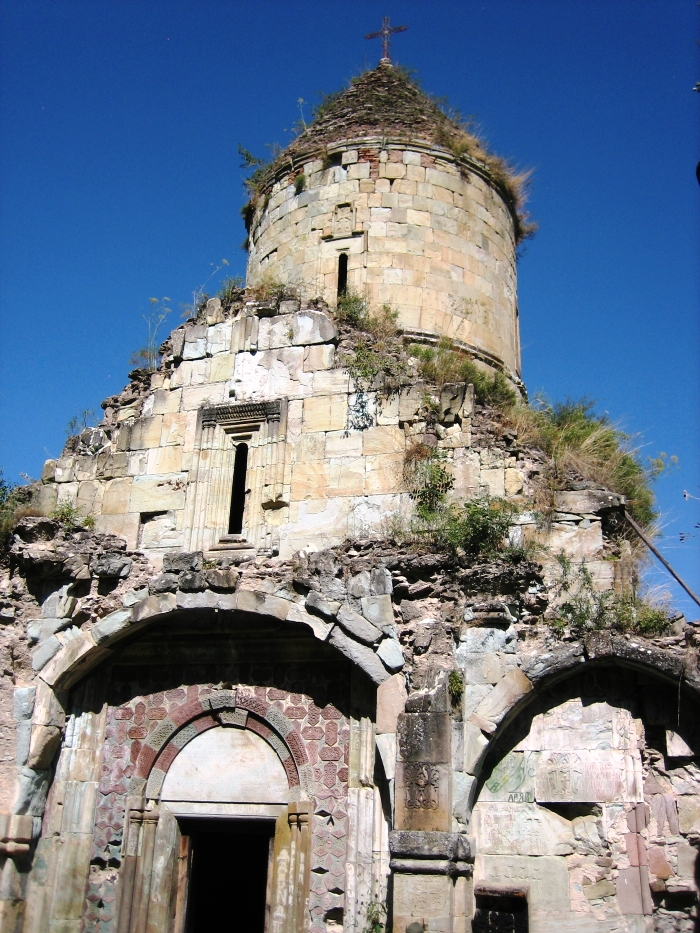
Church of the Mother-of-God (Holy Virgin) in Nor Varagavank

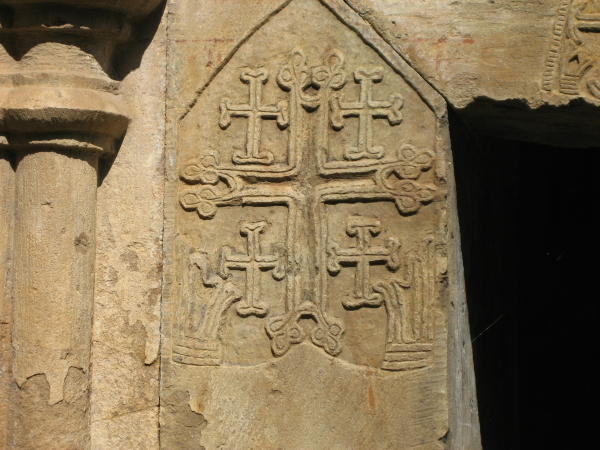
A Jerusalem Cross engraved near the entrance to the Church of the Mother-of-God, Nor Varagavank
