= Hogevank Monastery =

Armenian medieval monastery

Hogevank Monastery Հոգեվանք
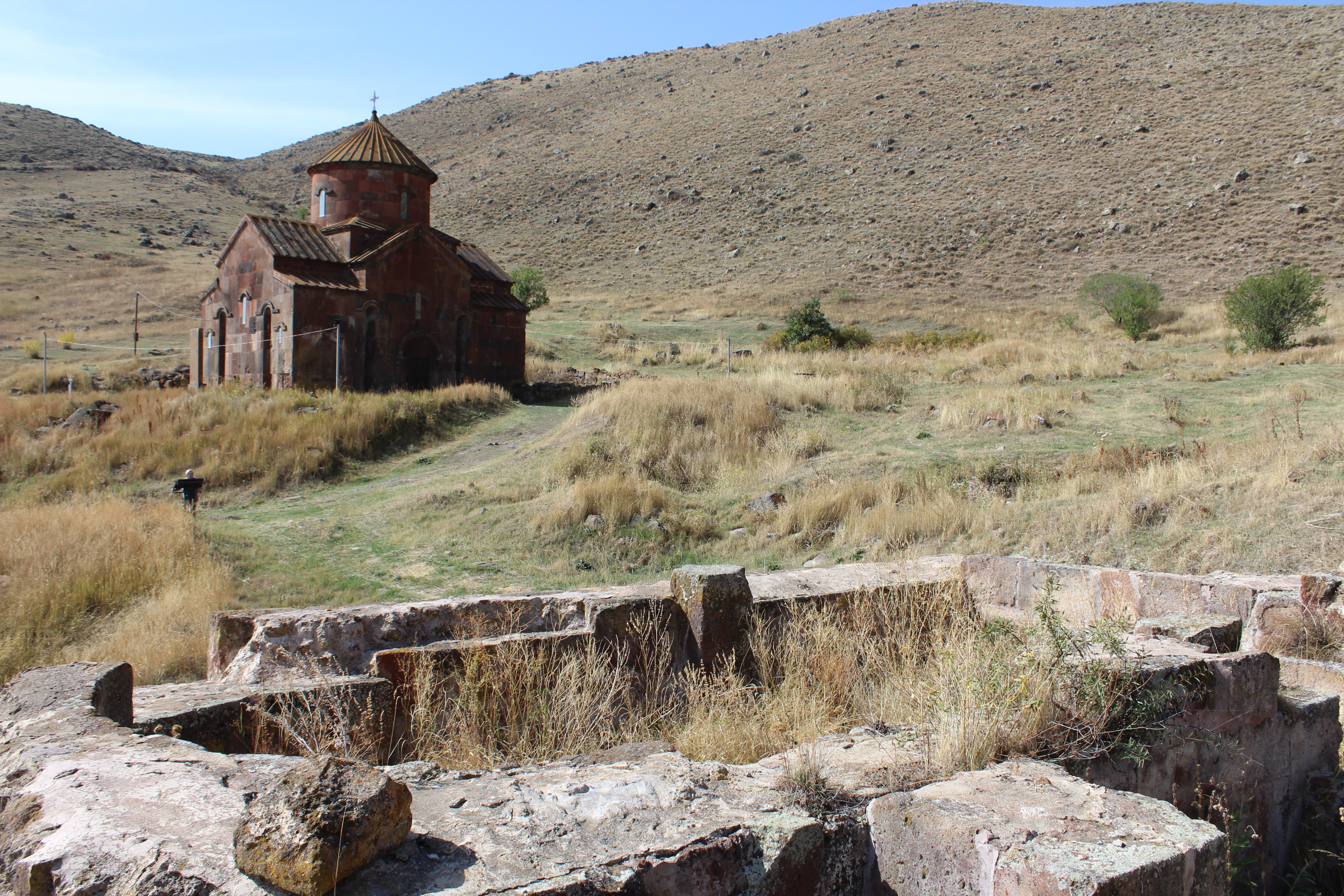
- St. Karapet Church; in the foreground the collapsed walls of a 7th century sanctuary

- Location within Armenia Location within Shirak

Religion
- Affiliation: Armenian Apostolic Church

Location
- Interactive map of Hogevank Monastery; Հոգեվանք
- Coordinates: 40°31′26.67″N 43°54′35.55″E

The medieval Hogevank Monastery (Armenian: Հոգեվանք; transliterated as Hogevank or Hokevank) is situated near the village of Sarnaghbyur (Սառնաղբյուր), in the Shirak Province of Armenia. It is also known as Karmir vank (Կարմիր վանք) or Dzoragyughi vank (Ձորագյուղի վանք),

Saint Karapet Church (Սբ. Կարապետ), completed in 1205, is the main building in the monastic complex. But, according to an inscription in the upper corner of the northern entrance, the church was initially named Saint Stepanos (Սբ. Ստեփանոս).

The shrine has two entrances: the western and the northern. On the eastern side, there is the semicircular main altar, with arched, exposed vestries placed on each side at a right angle. The dome of the church is in the form of a cylindrical drum. As a result of an earthquake in 1939 the cupola was destroyed; it was restored in 1980. Originally, the church was built of red polished tuff. However, brown and black tuffs were also used during the restoration. There are citations on the outer walls.

Inside the church there exist four-sided carved commemorative markers, made during the 4th and 5th centuries, as well as numerous broken pieces of Khachkar (Armenian cross-stones) from the 13th century. Because of age, the inscriptions on them are illegible.

To the north of Saint Karapet Church, the collapsed walls of a 5th-century single nave chapel and a 7th-century sanctuary with four apses may be seen.

== Gallery ==
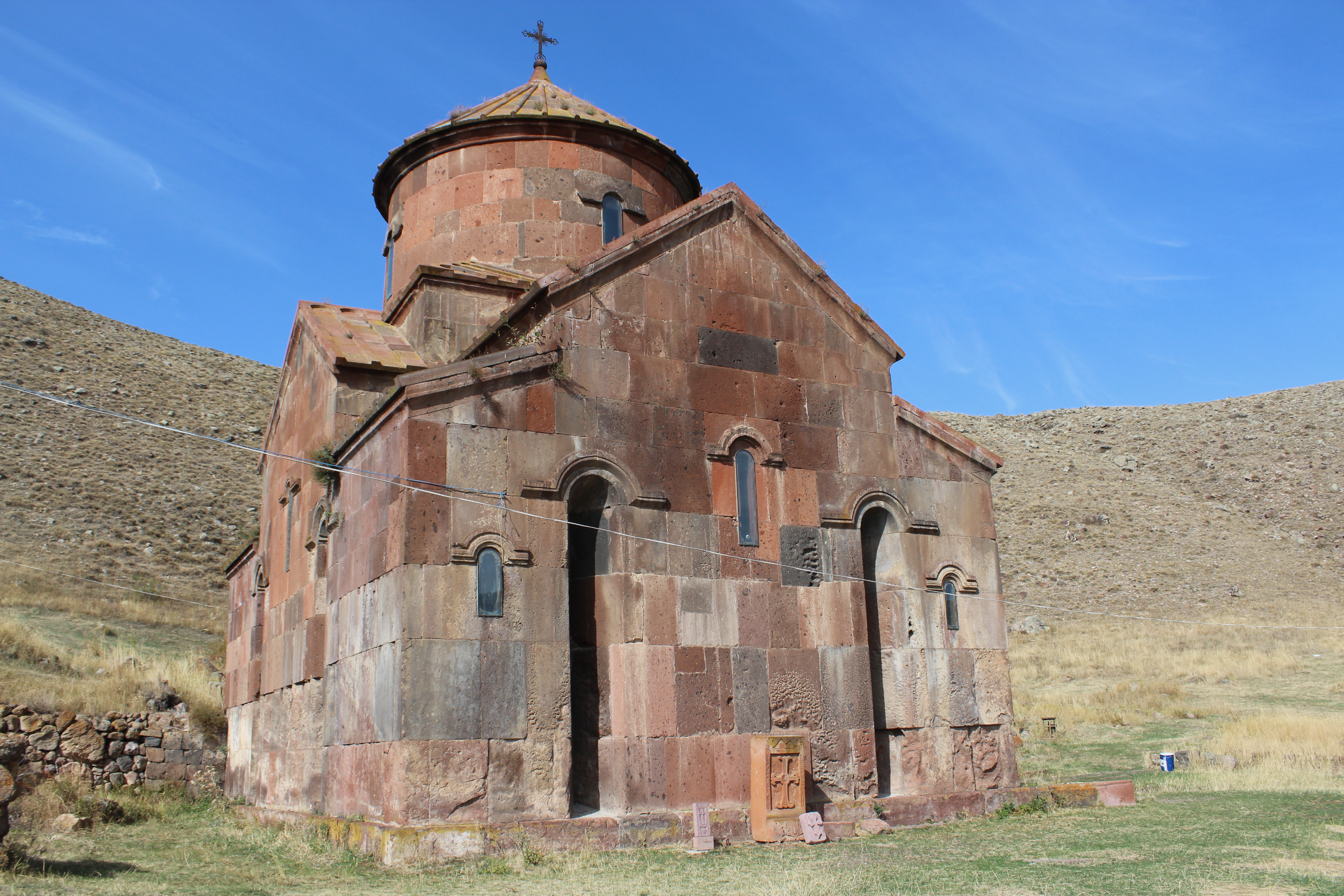
St. Karapet Church built in 1205

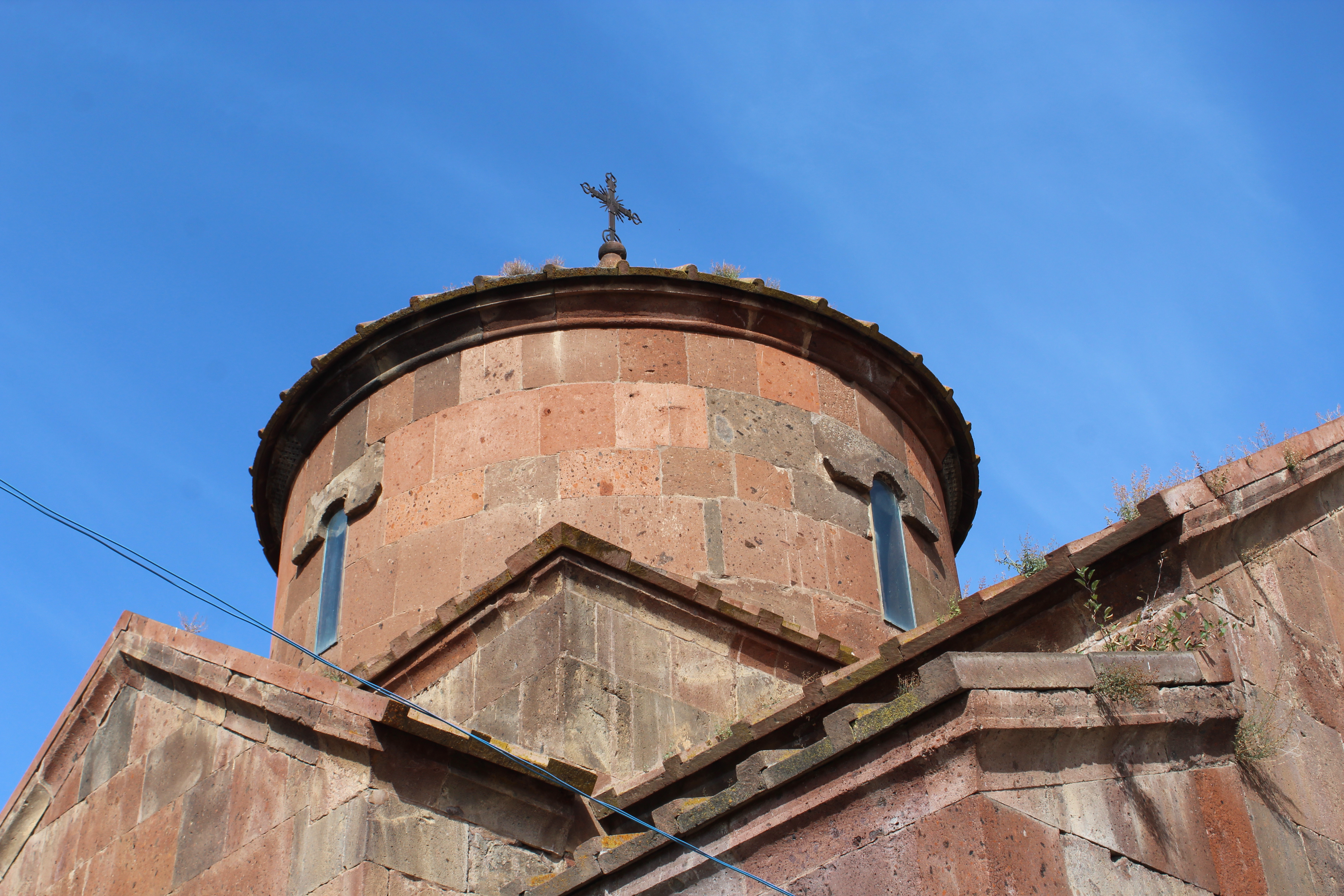
Dome of St. Karapet Church, reconstructed in 1980

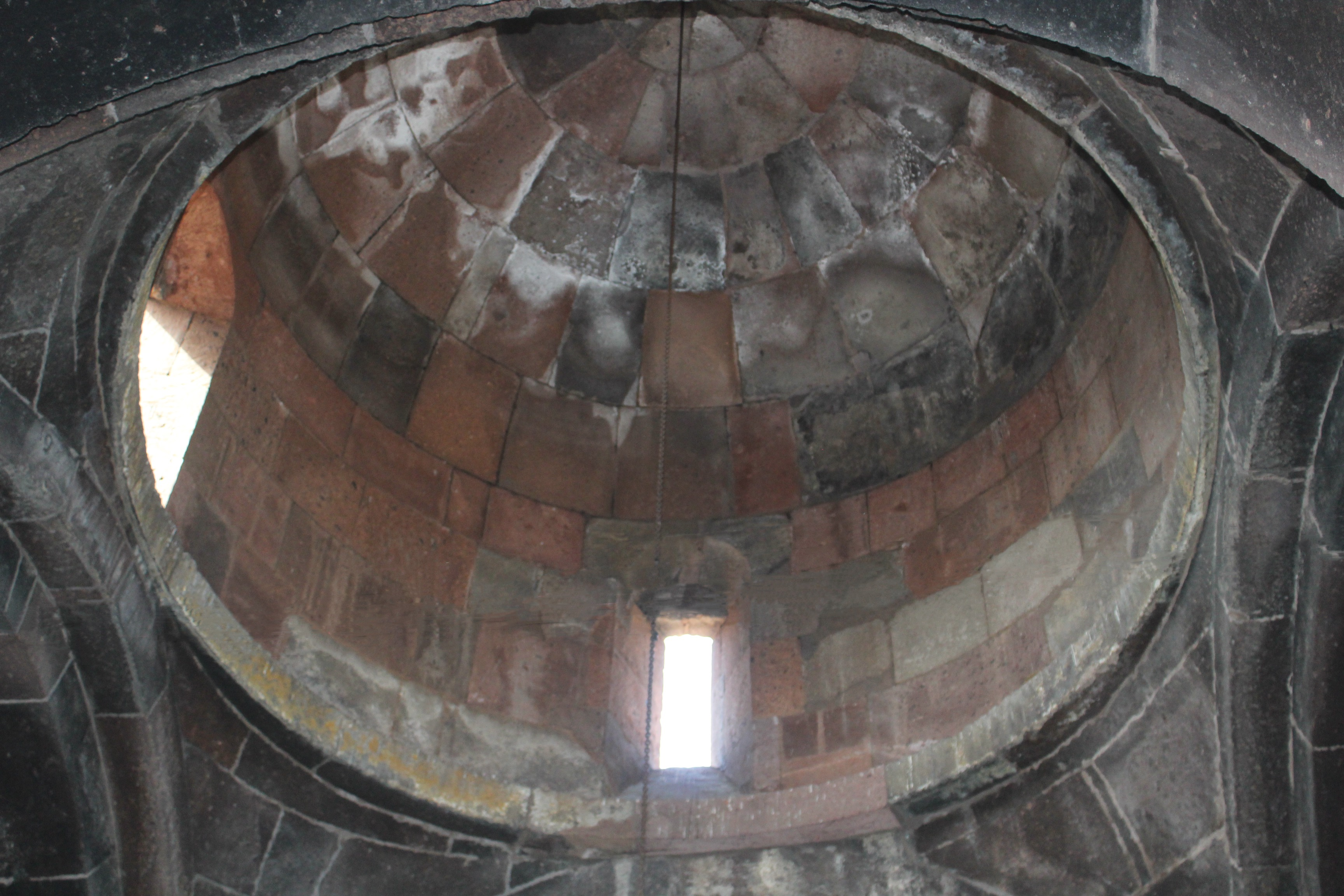
Interior of the dome

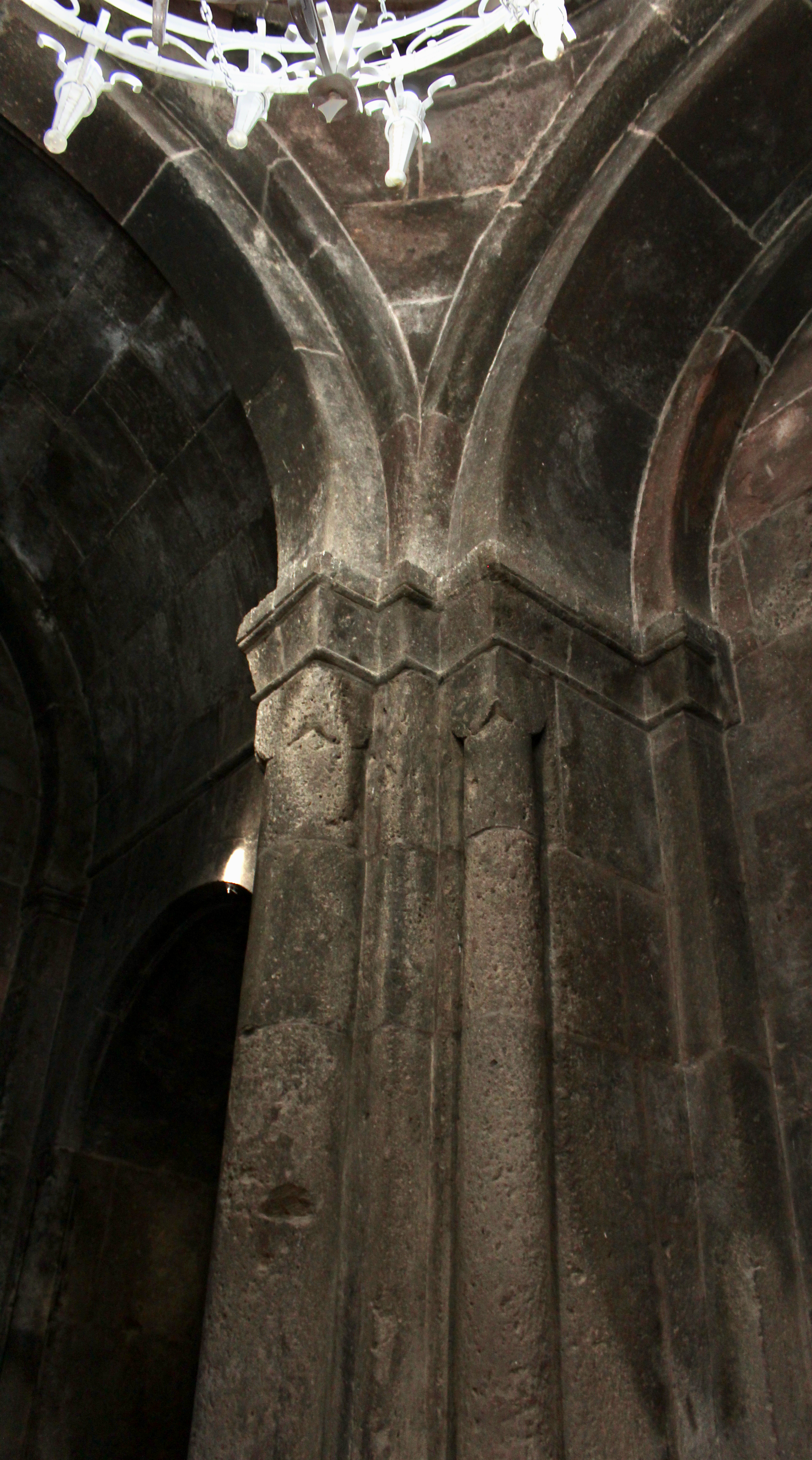
A pillar in St. Karapet Church

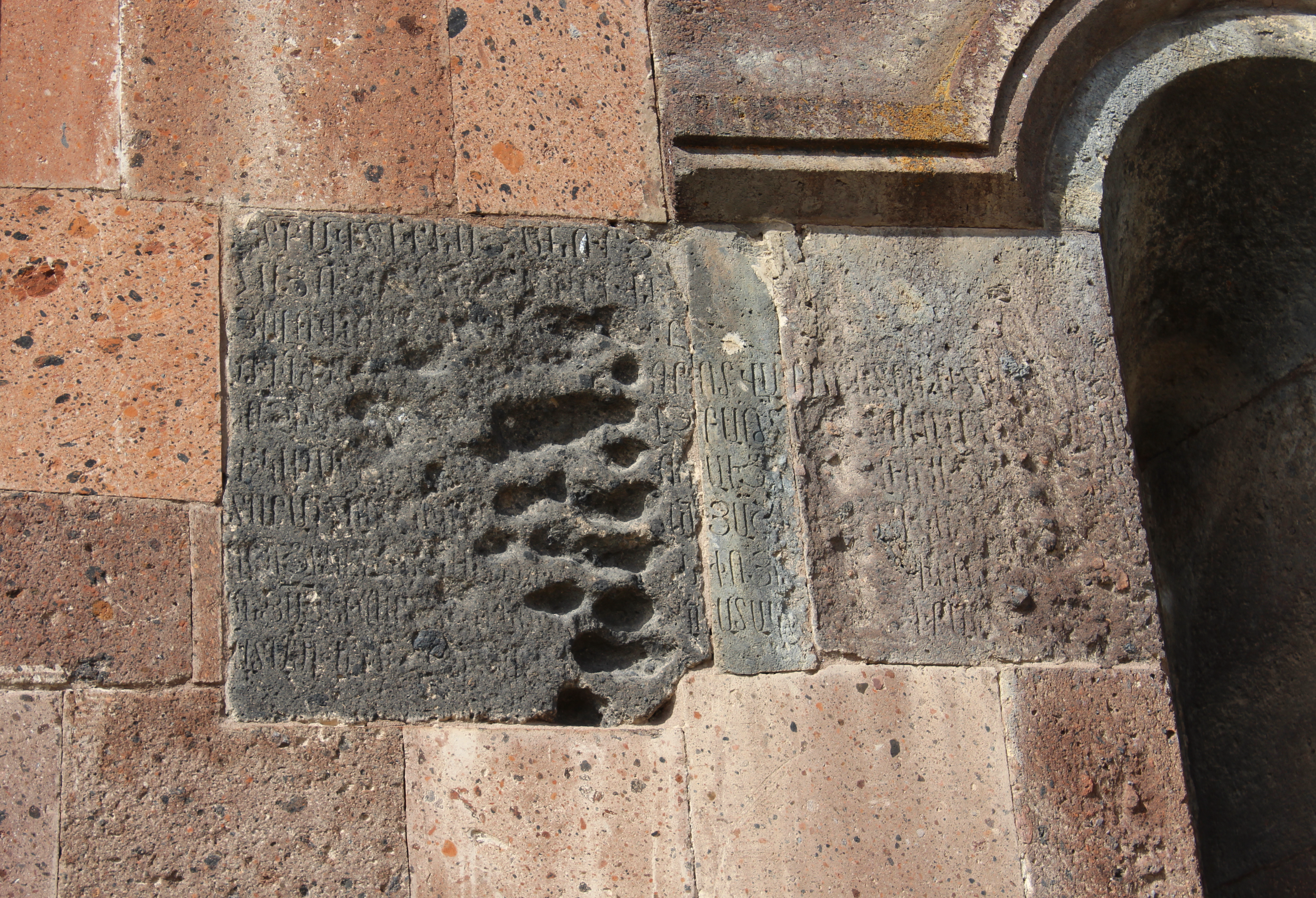
Inscriptions on an exterior wall

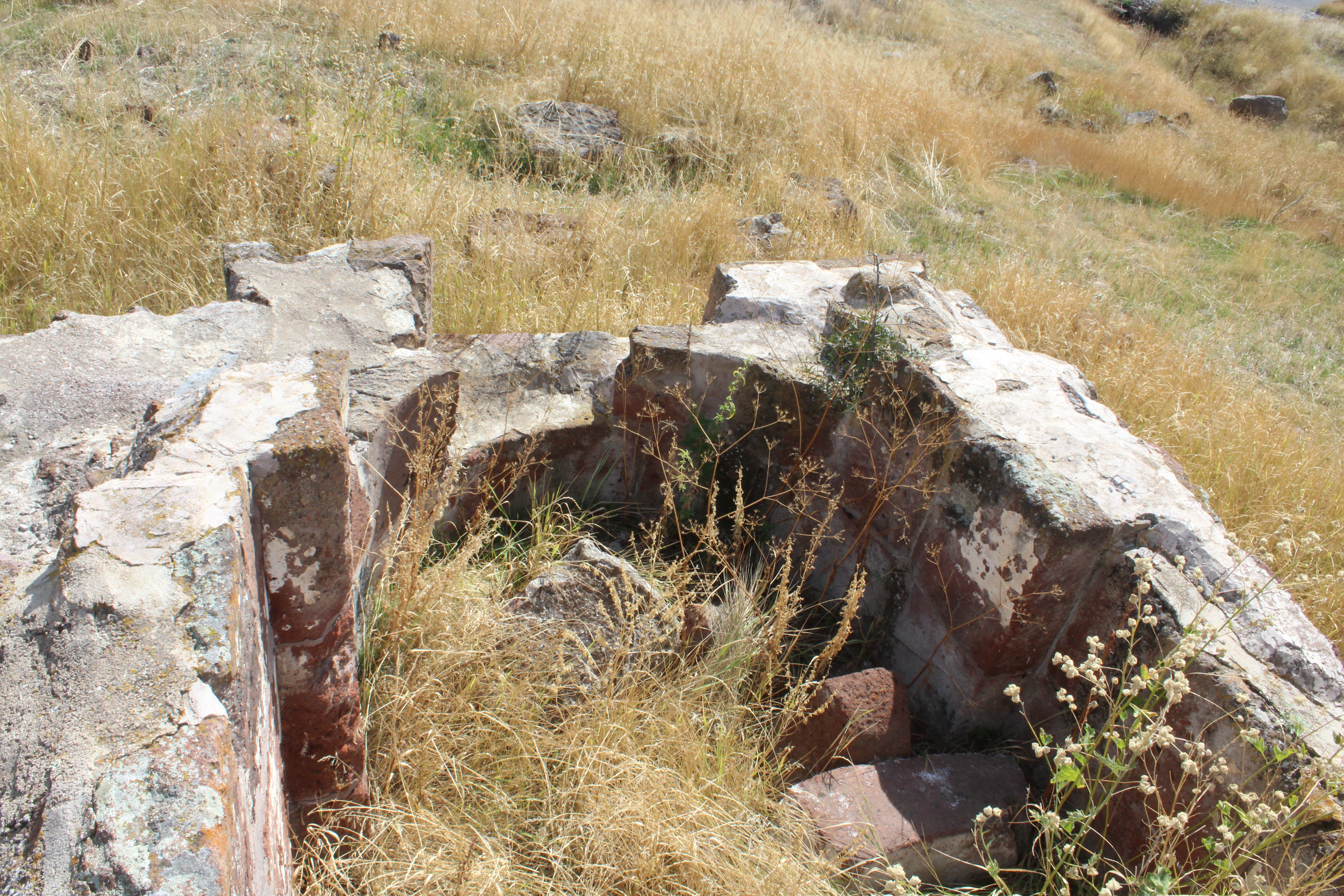
Remains of a 5th Century sanctuary in Hogevank Monastery
