= Karenis =

Village in Kotayk, Armenia

Karenis Կարենիս
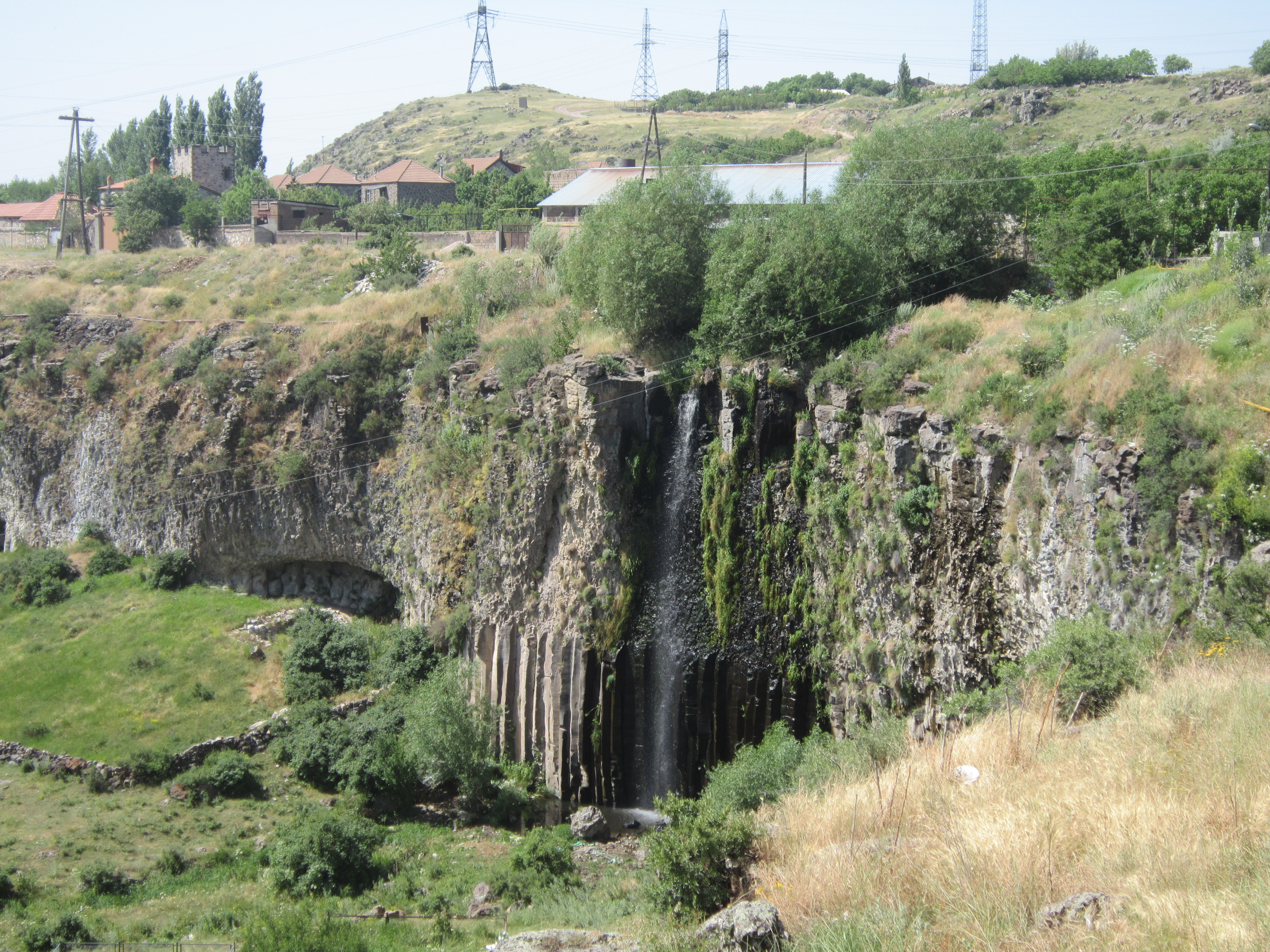
- The village of Karenis

- Location within Armenia
- Coordinates: 40°23′30″N 44°36′26″E
- Country: Armenia
- Marz (Province): Kotayk

Population (2011)
  - Total: 663
- Time zone: UTC+4 ( )
  - Summer (DST): UTC+5 ( )

Karenis (Armenian: Կարենիս; formerly, Gyumush and Glamuzh) is a village in Kotayk Province of Armenia.

== See also ==
- Kotayk Province
