= Varagavan =

Varagavan Վարագավան
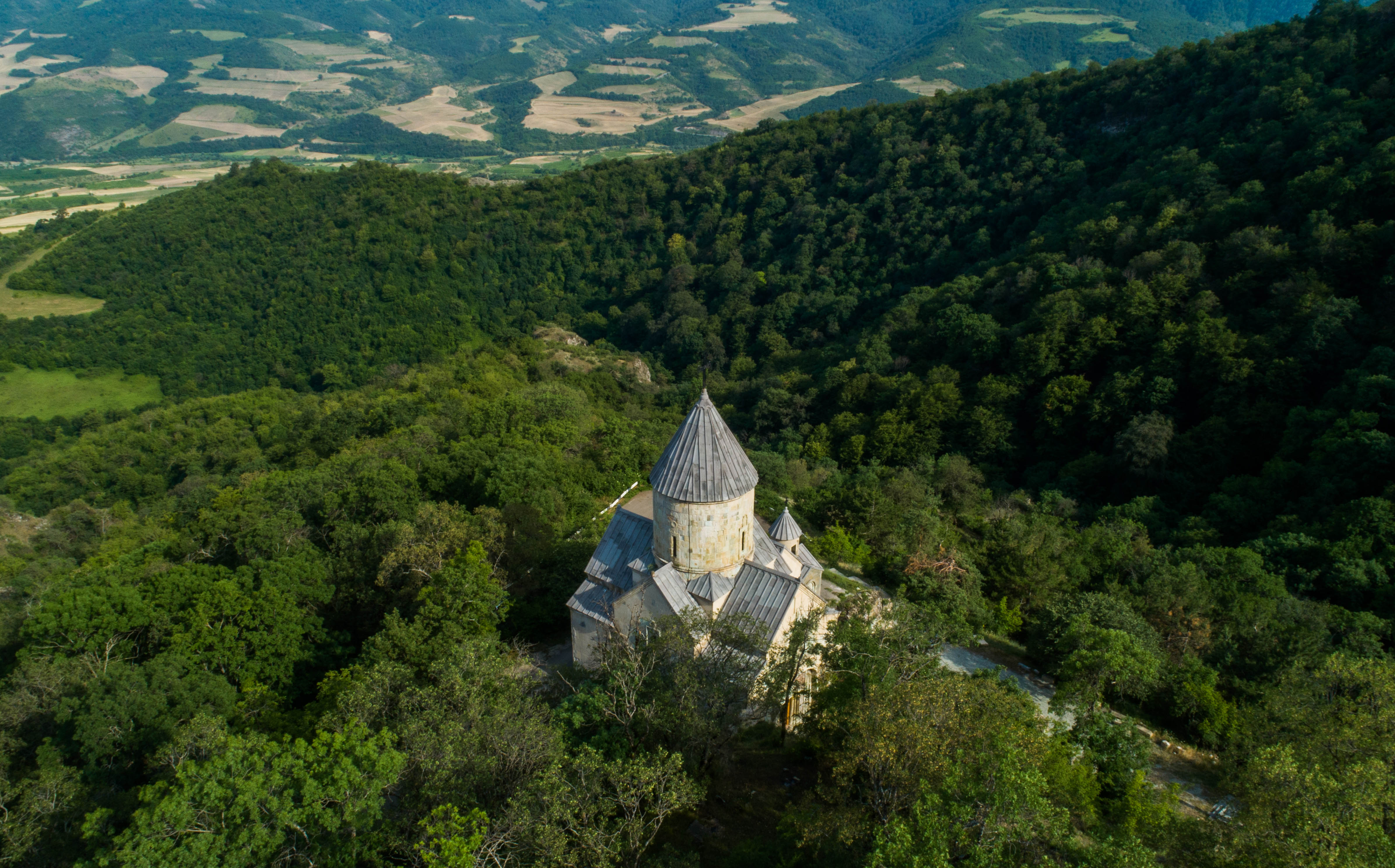
- Scenery around nearby Nor Varagavank

- Location within Armenia Location within Tavush
- Coordinates: 40°57′45″N 45°21′05″E
- Country: Armenia
- Province: Tavush
- Municipality: Berd

Population (2011)
  - Total: 630
- Time zone: UTC+4 (AMT)

Varagavan (Armenian: Վարագավան) is a village in the Berd Municipality of the Tavush Province of Armenia. The 13th-century Nor Varagavank monastery is located 3.5 km southwest of Varagavan.

== Gallery ==
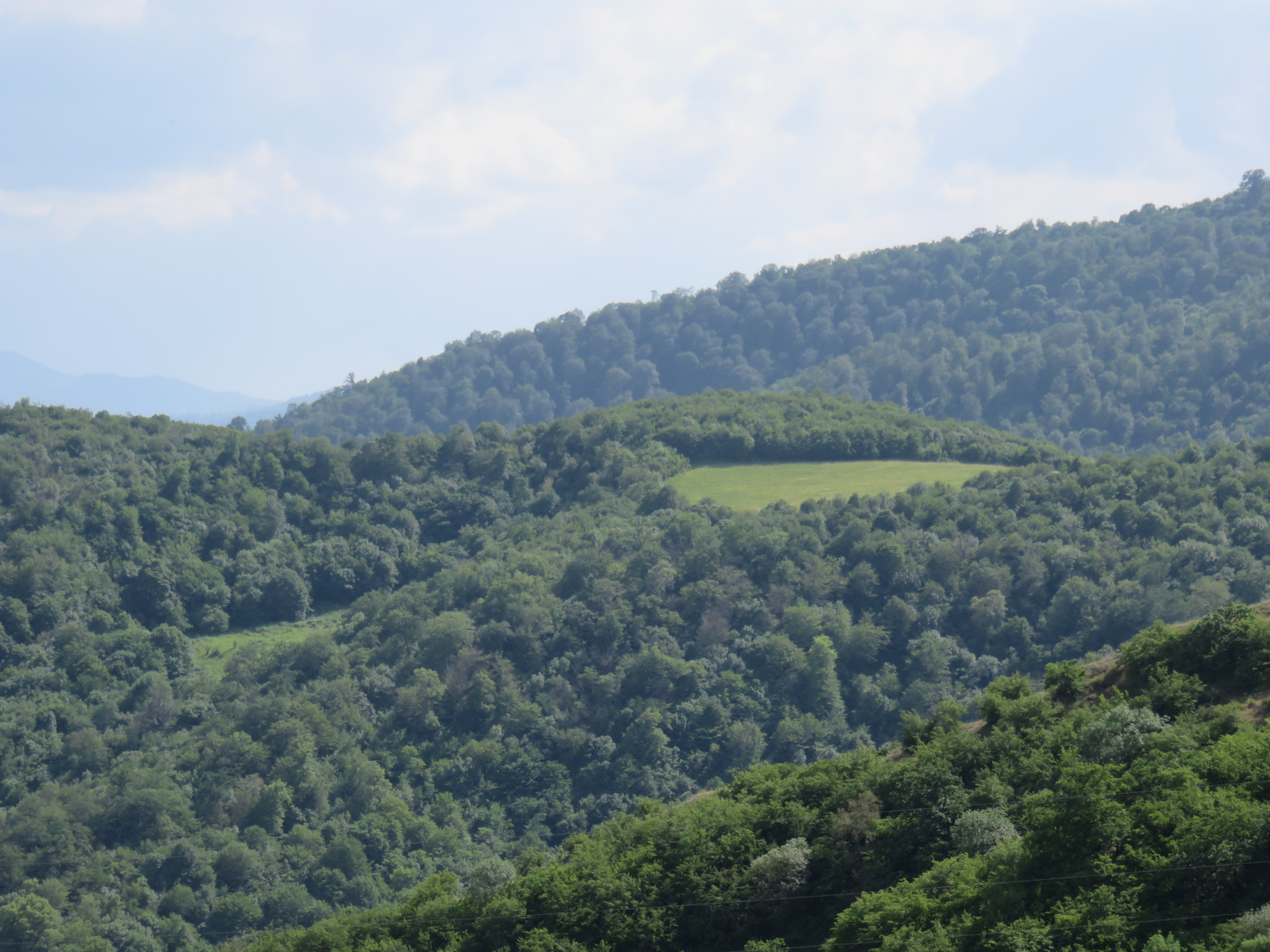
Scenery around Varagavan

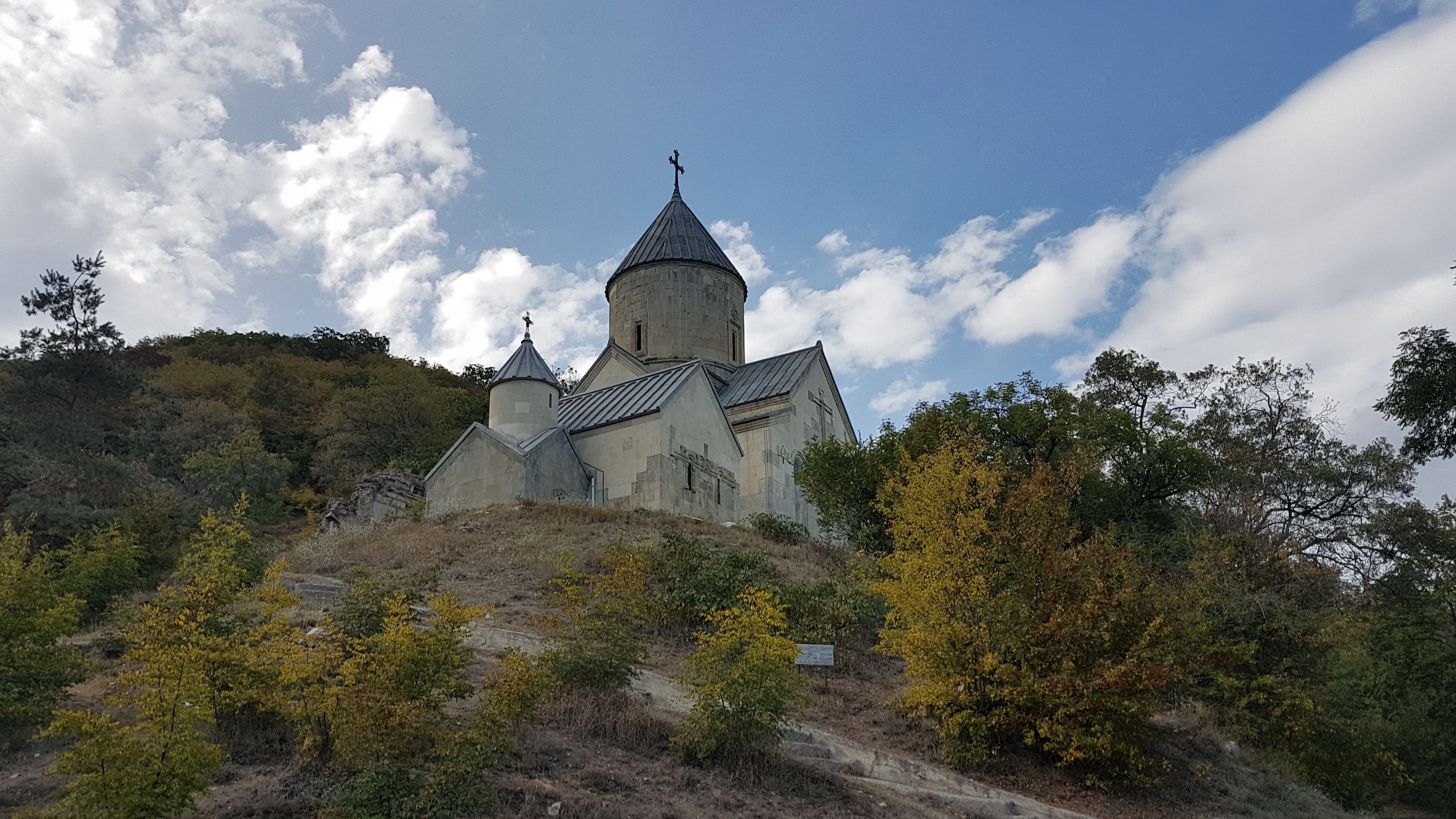
Nor Varagavank
