= Chochkan =

Chochkan Ճոճկան
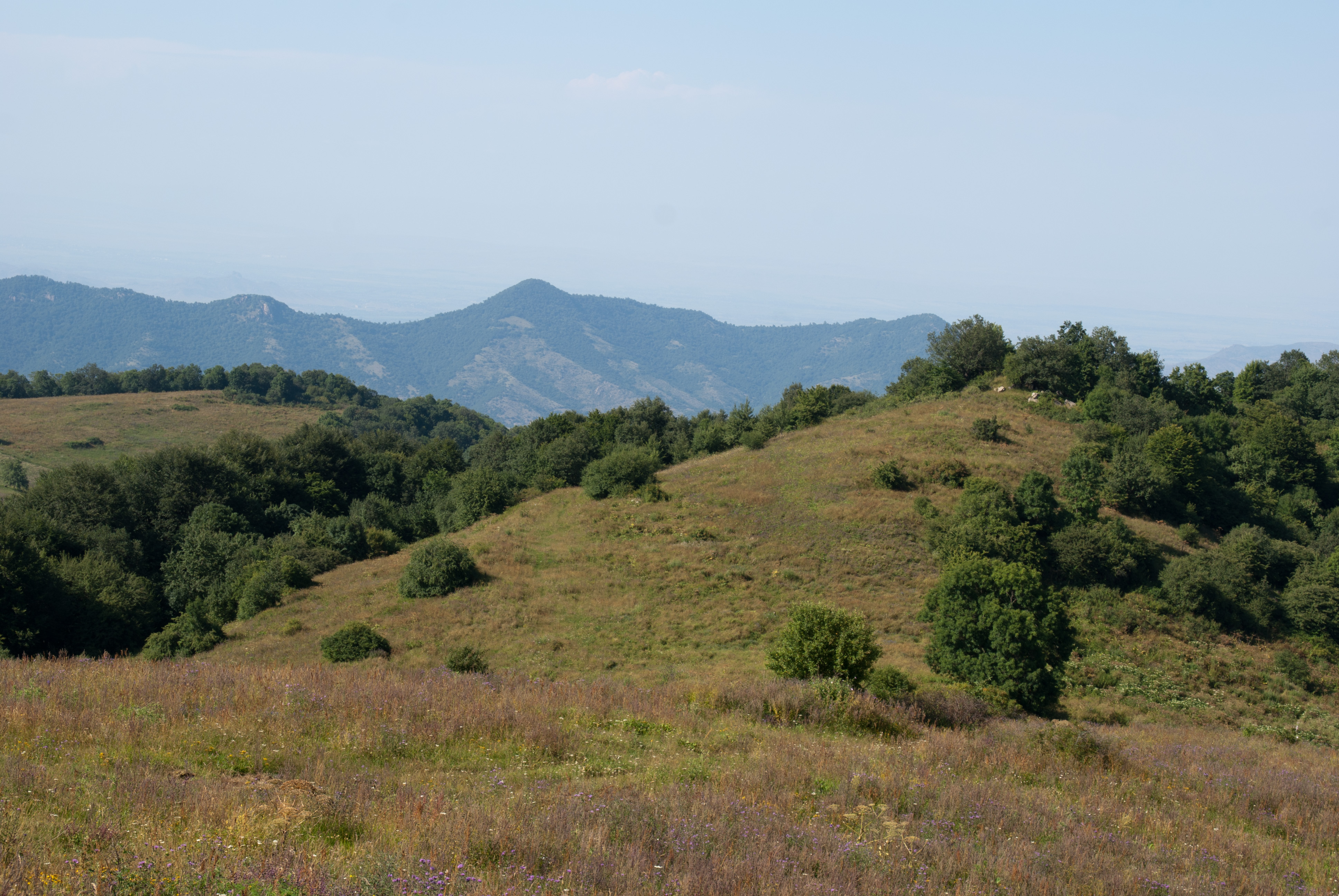
- Scenery around Chochkan

- Location within Armenia
- Coordinates: 41°11′10″N 44°49′53″E
- Country: Armenia
- Municipality: Alaverdi
- Province: Lori
- Elevation: 740 m (2,430 ft)

Population (2011)
  - Total: 1,559
- Time zone: UTC+4 (AMT)

Chochkan (Armenian: Ճոճկան) is a village in the Lori Province of Armenia.

== Notable people ==
- Sergo Yeritsyan was an Armenian journalist and politician

== Gallery ==
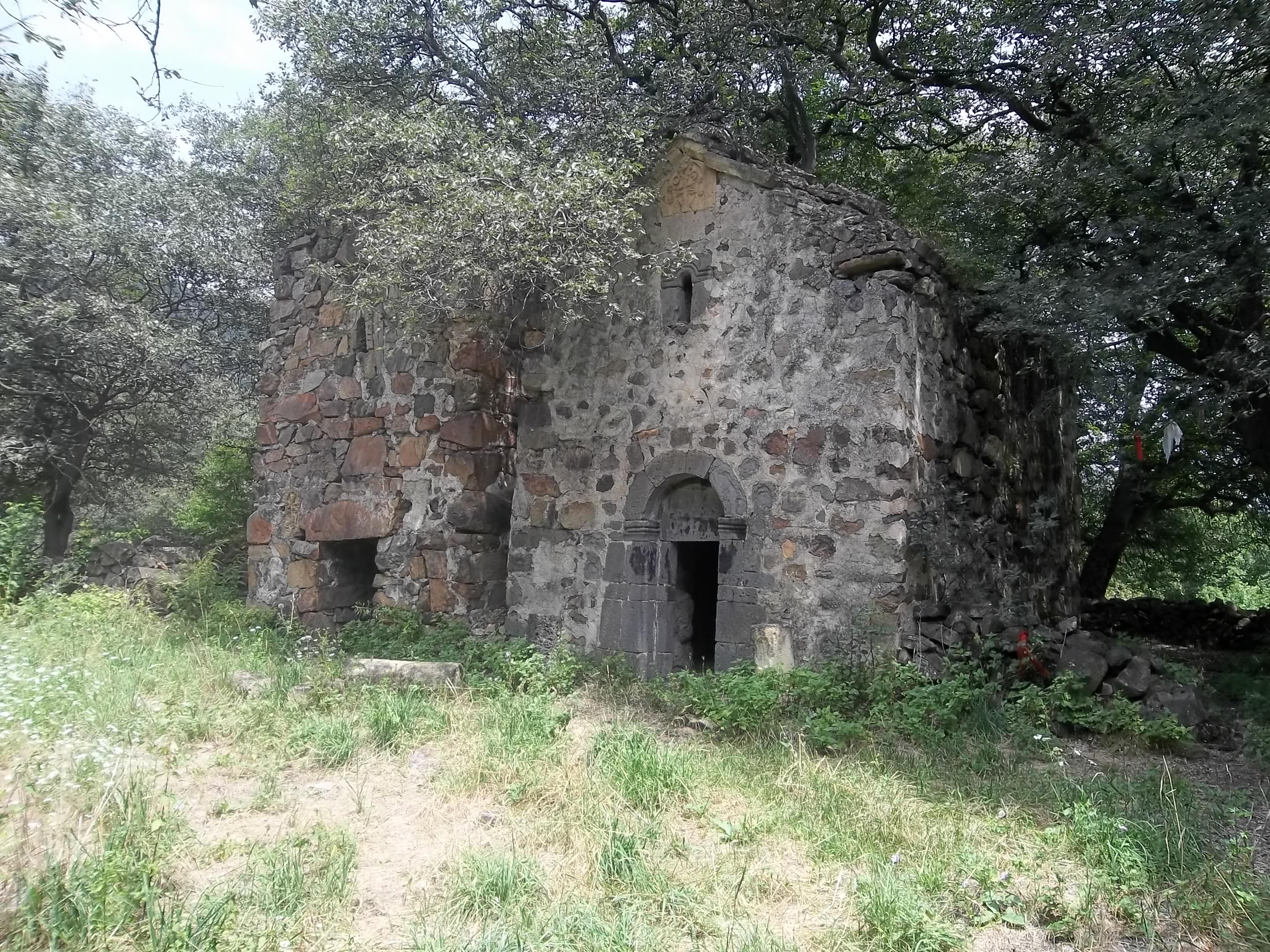
Nahatak Monastery

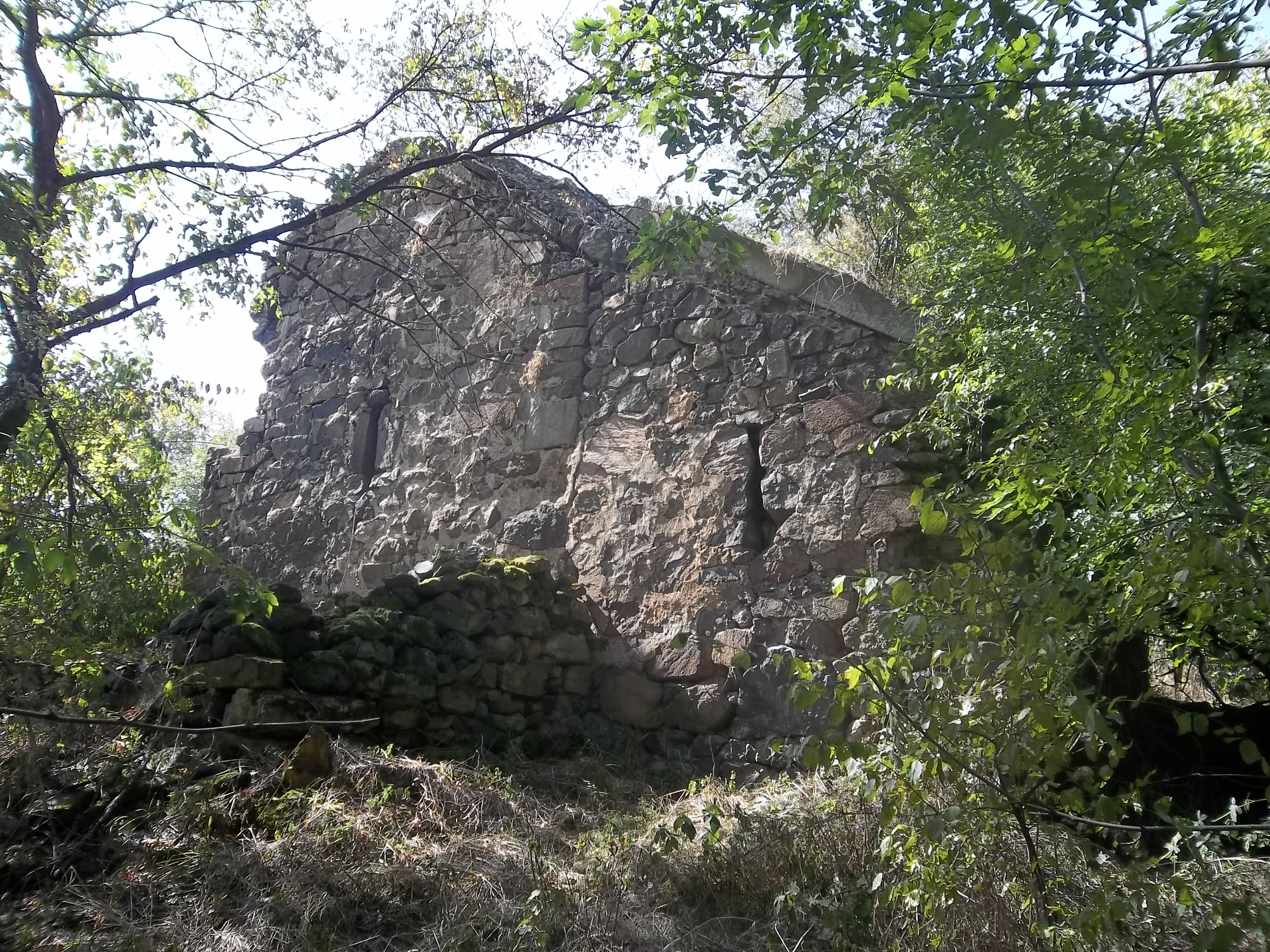
Shprtnavank
