= Mayravank =

Medieval Armenian monastery in Solak, Kotayk, Armenia

Mayravank (Armenian: Մայրավանք, literally "mother monastery") is a ruined medieval Armenian monastery located near the village of Solak in Armenia's Kotayk Province. Today, only the Surb Astvatsatsin (Holy Mother of God) Church of the 11th-12th centuries stands. It is located atop a cliff surrounded by evergreen trees.

== Gallery ==
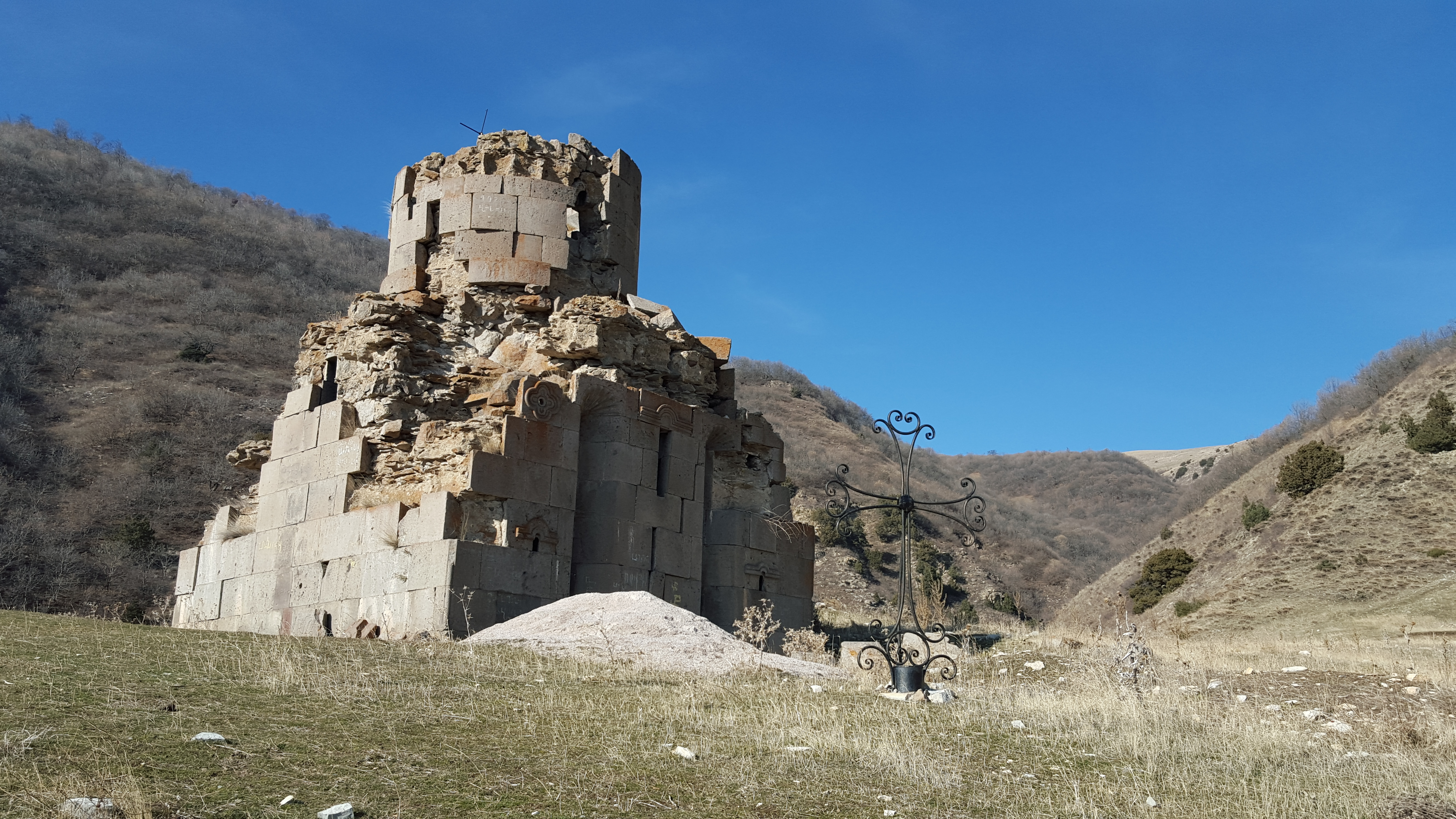

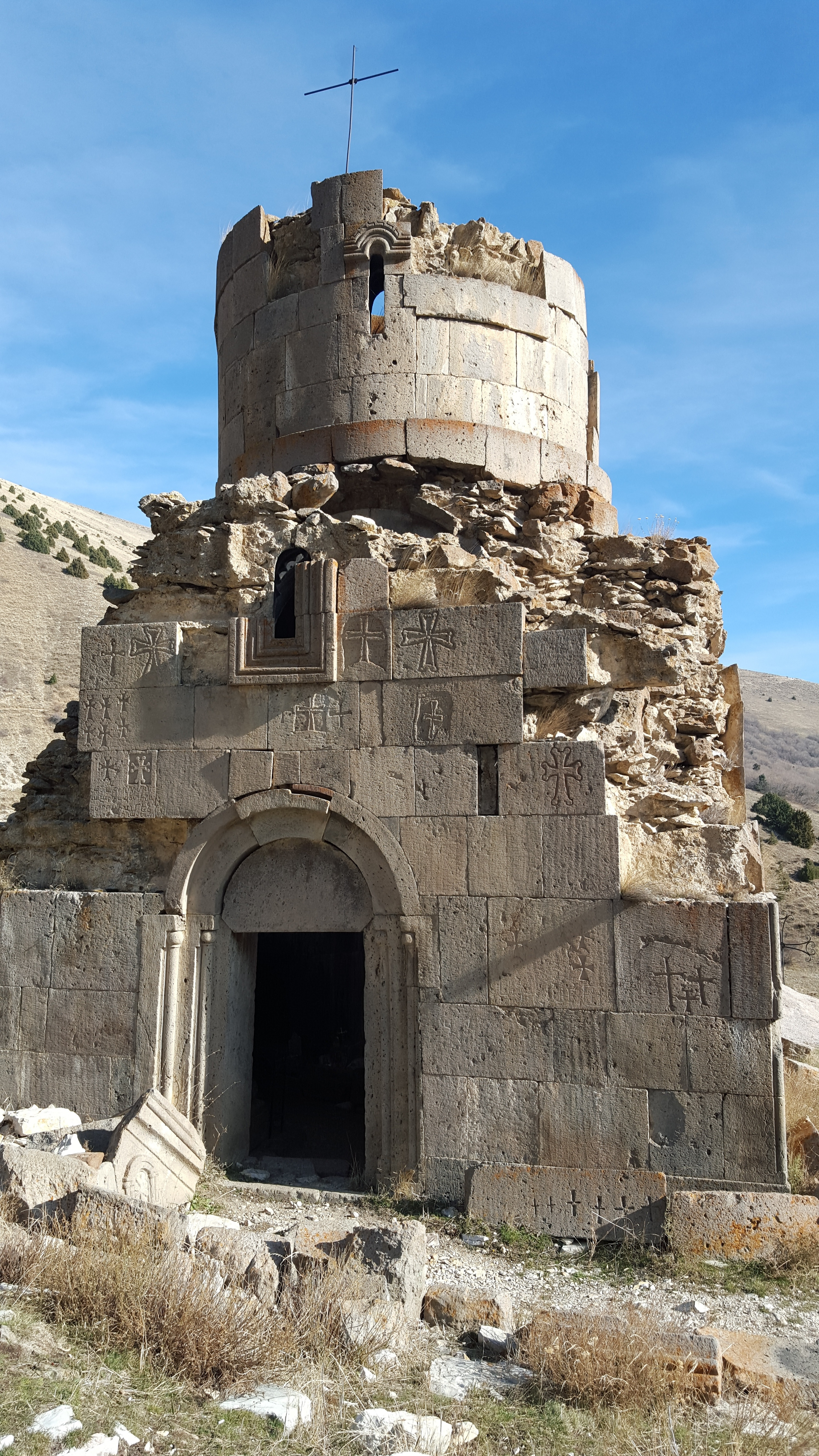

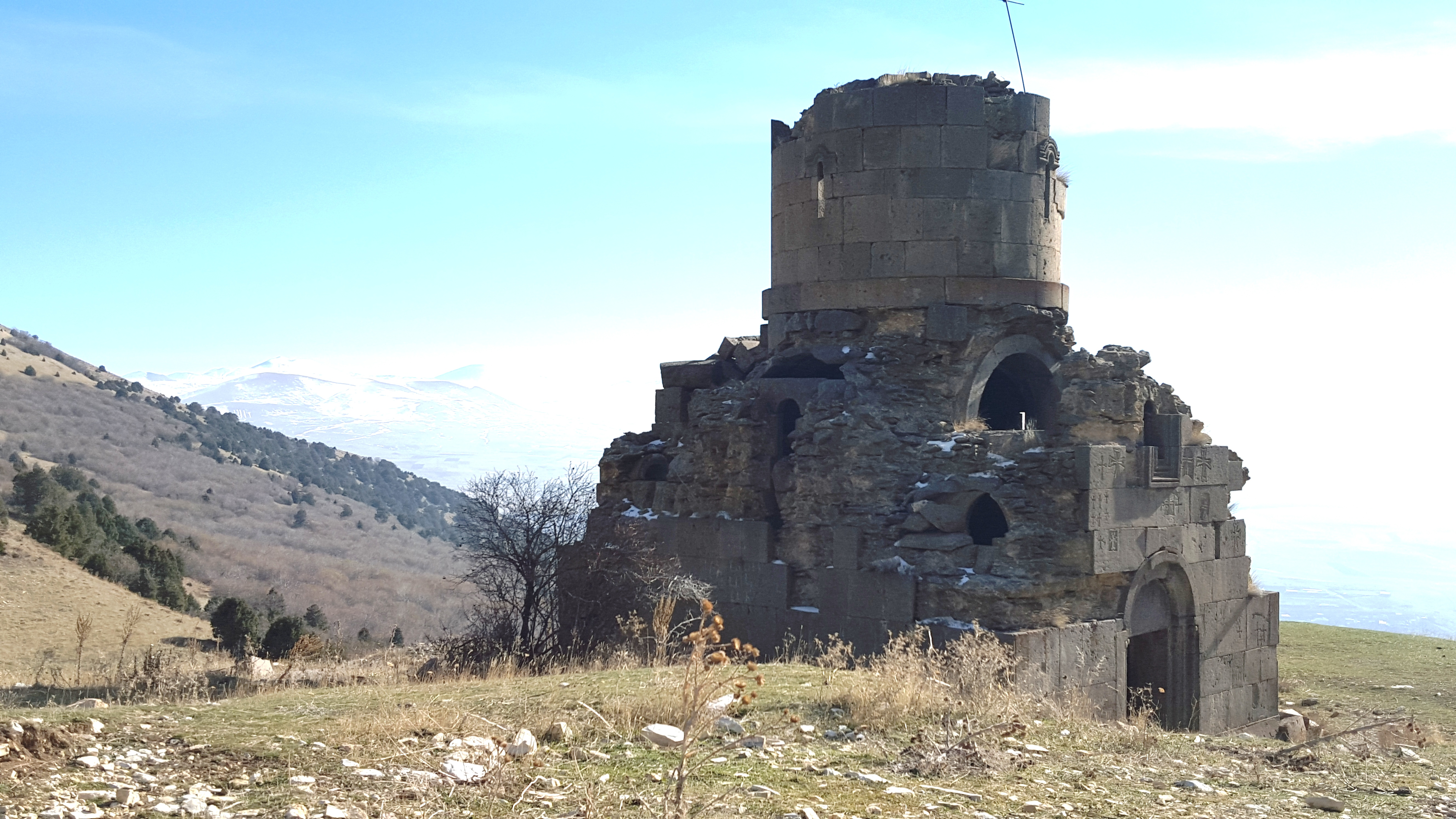

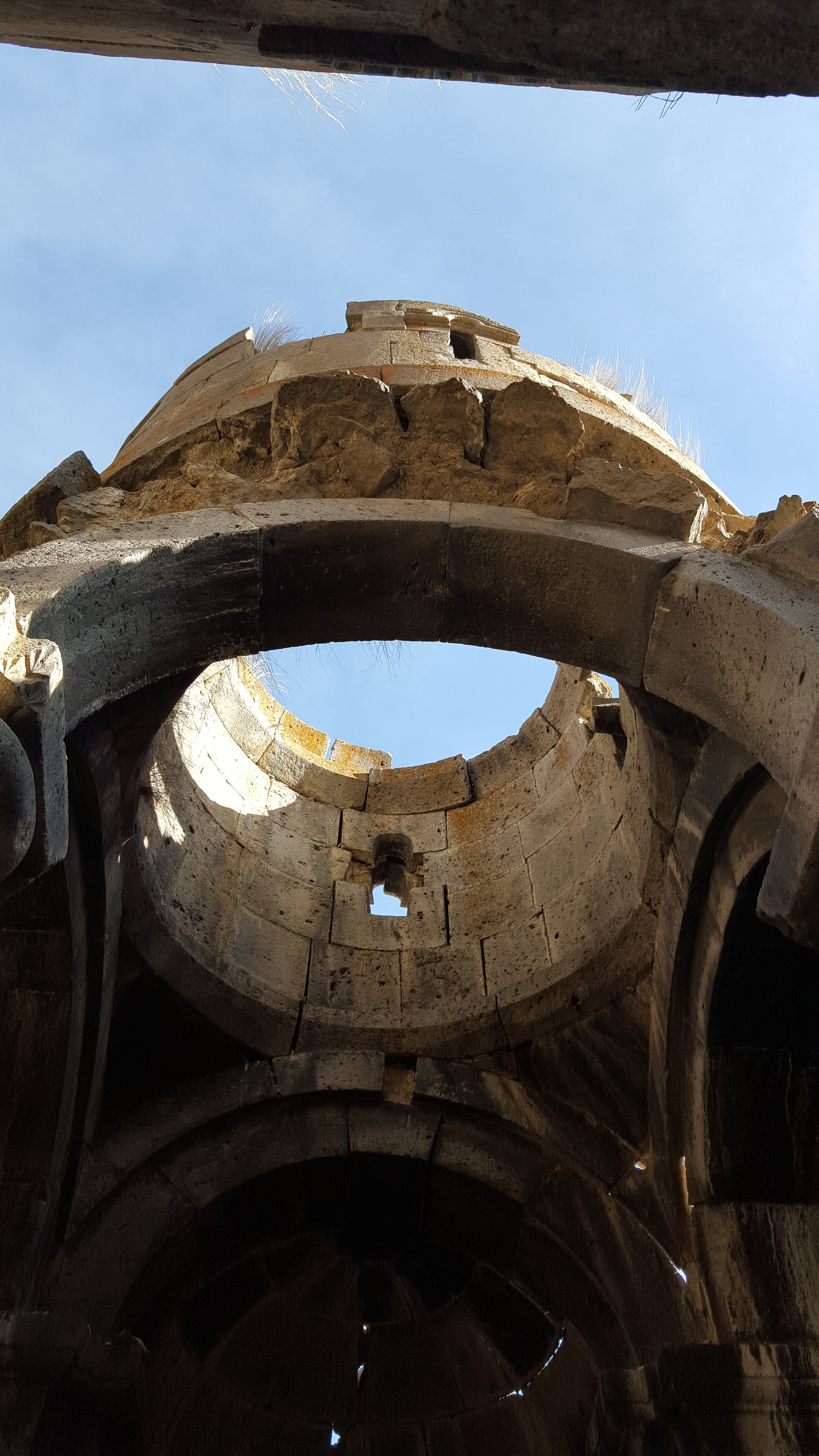

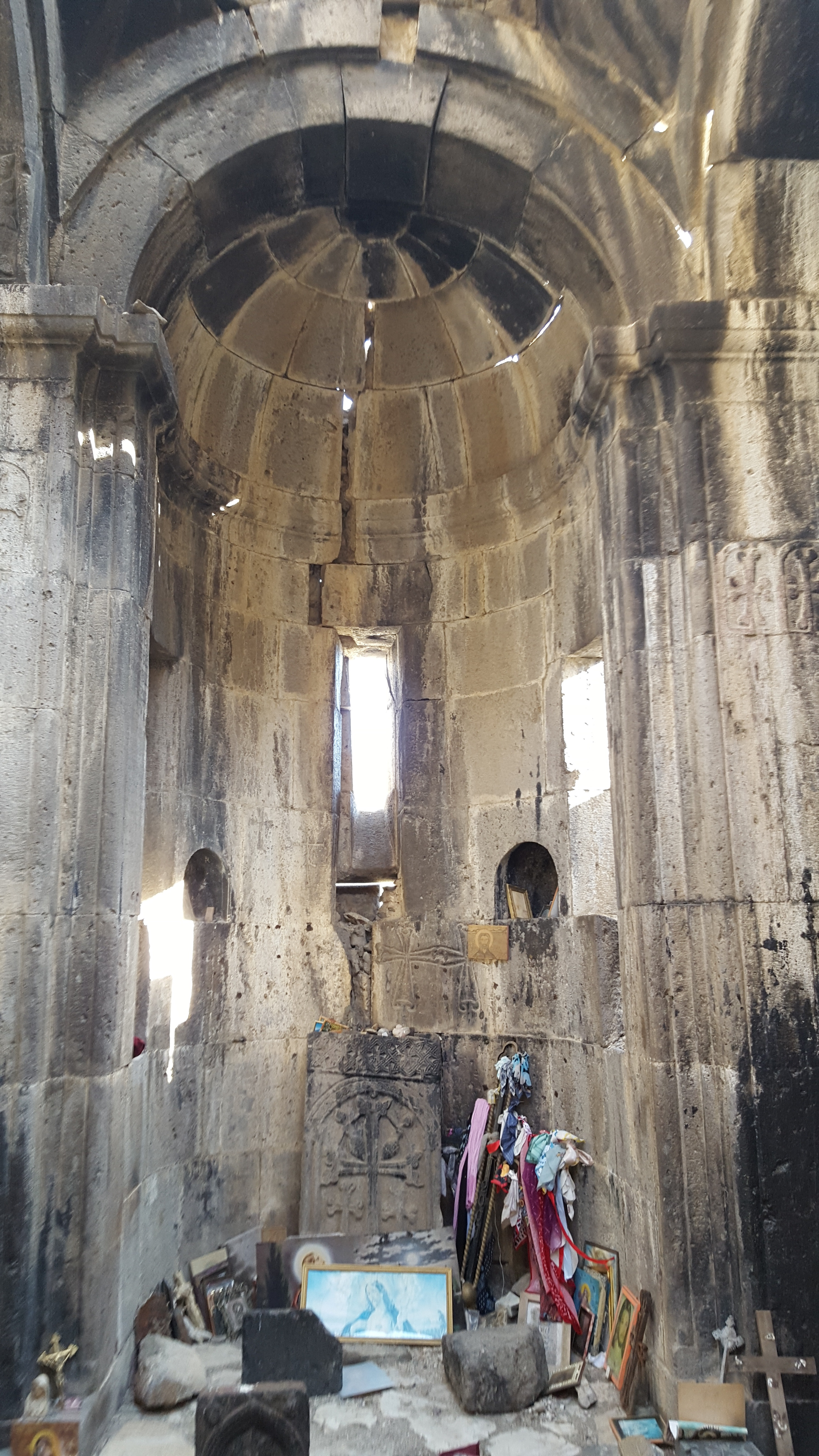

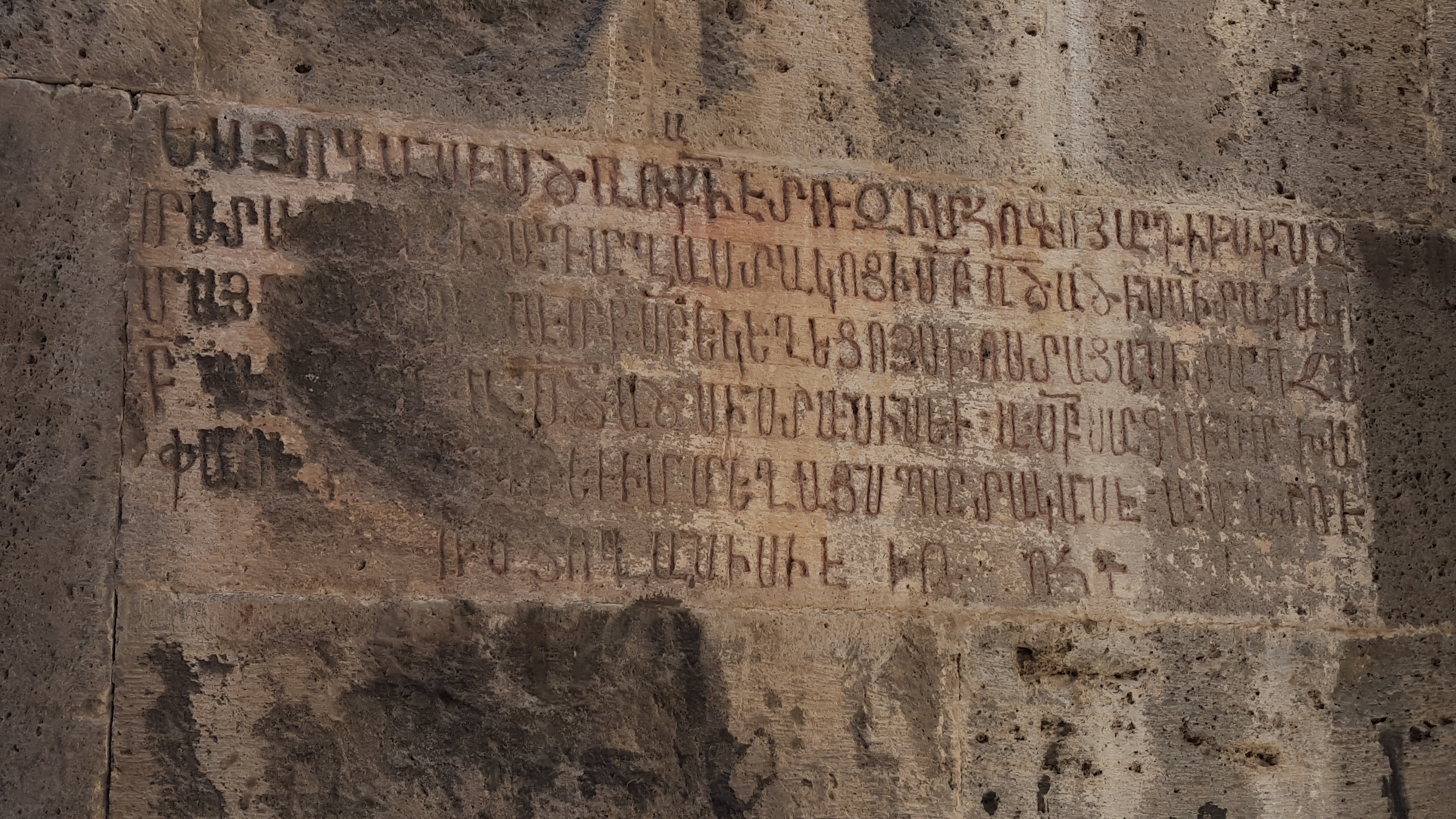
