= Ohanavan =

Ohanavan Օհանավան
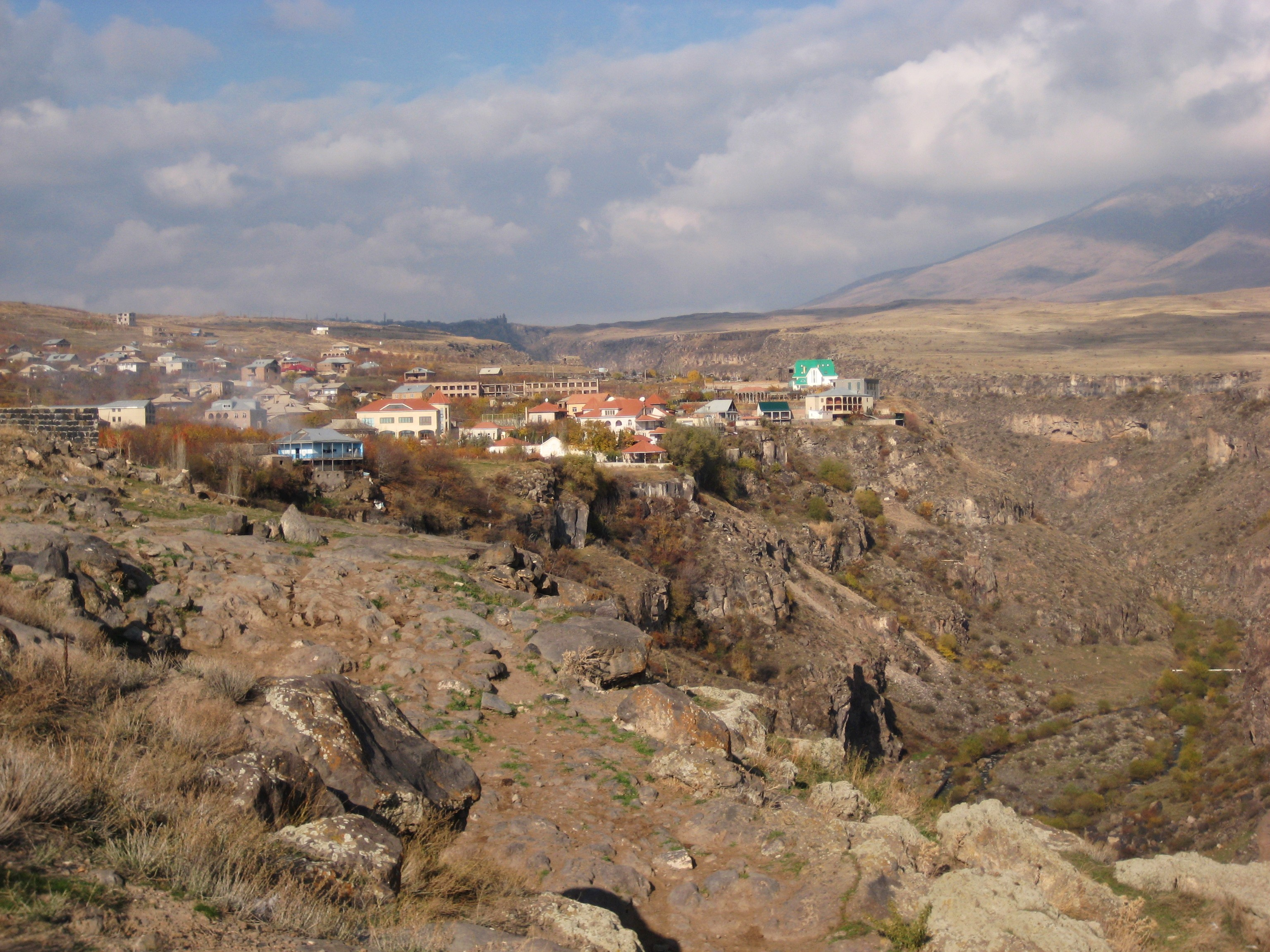
- The village of Ohanavan.

- Location within Armenia Location within Aragatsotn
- Coordinates: 40°20′45″N 44°22′59″E
- Country: Armenia
- Province: Aragatsotn
- Municipality: Ashtarak

Population (2011)
  - Total: 2,312
- Time zone: UTC+4
  - Summer (DST): UTC+5

Ohanavan (Armenian: Օհանավան) is a village in the Ashtarak Municipality of the Aragatsotn Province of Armenia. Ohanavan was resettled in 1828 by emigrants from Muş. On a nearby escarpment sits the 13th-century Hovhannavank Monastery. Both the town and the monastery are situated atop a steep gorge carved by the Kasagh river.

== Recent Discoveries ==
In February 2024, a medieval rock-hewn tomb was uncovered in Ohanavan. Discovered by a local resident during excavation, the tomb has been documented by the Ministry of Education, Science, Culture, and Sport, with plans for further archaeological study.

== Gallery ==
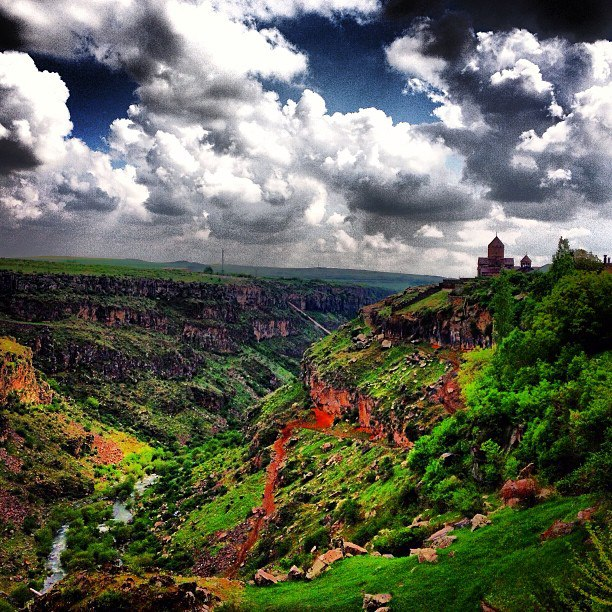
Ohanavan and the Hovhannavank Monastery are situated atop a steep gorge carved by the Kasagh river
