= Acharkut =

Acharkut Աճարկուտ
- Scenery around Deghdznut Monastery

- Location within Armenia Location within Tavush
- Coordinates: 41°02′09″N 45°05′06″E
- Country: Armenia
- Province: Tavush
- Municipality: Ijevan

Population (2011)
  - Total: 200
- Time zone: UTC+4 (AMT)

Acharkut (Armenian: Աճարկուտ) is a village in the Ijevan Municipality of the Tavush Province of Armenia.

== Toponymy ==
The village was previously known as Kunen.

== Gallery ==
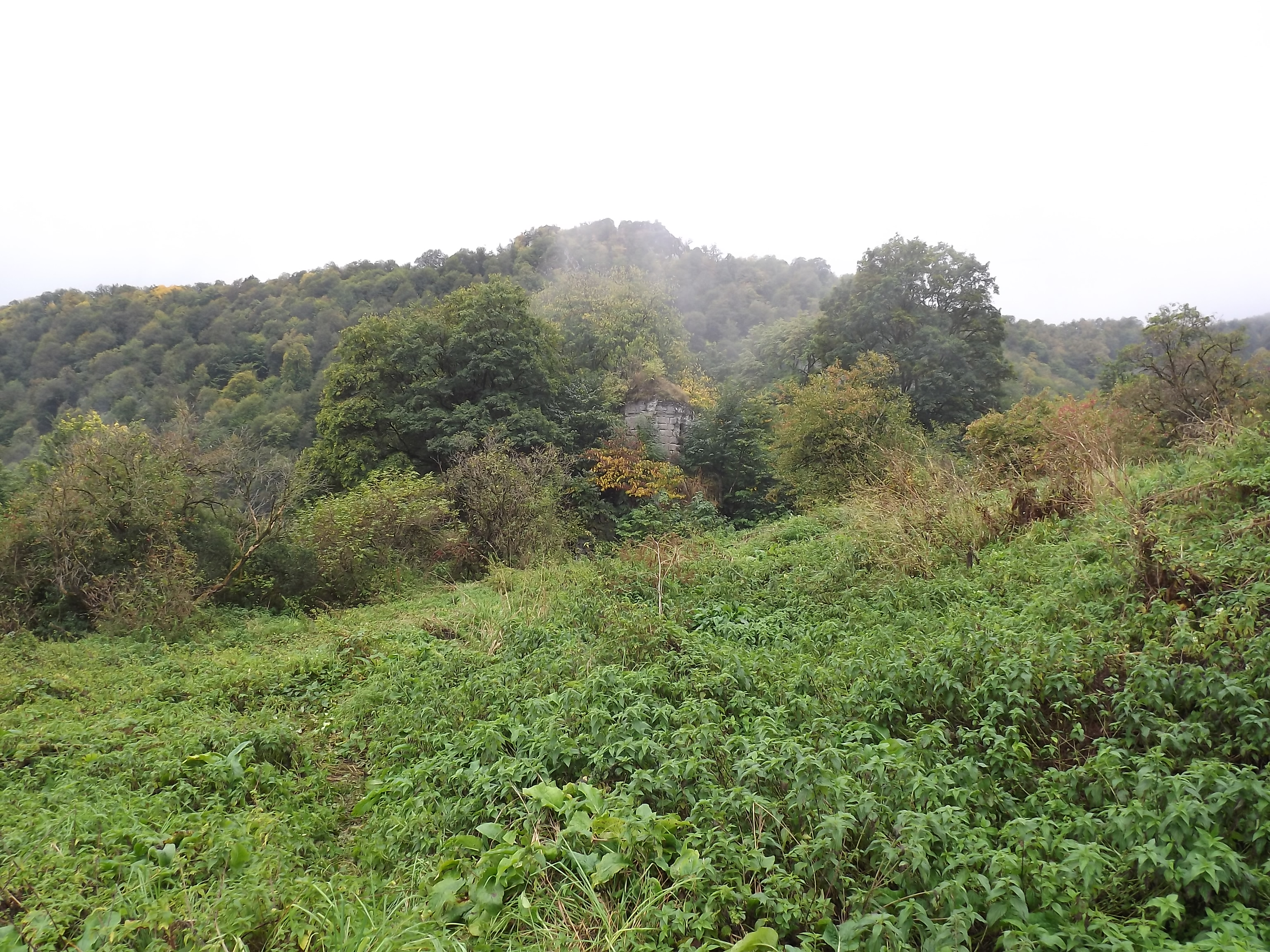
Scenery around Samson Monastery

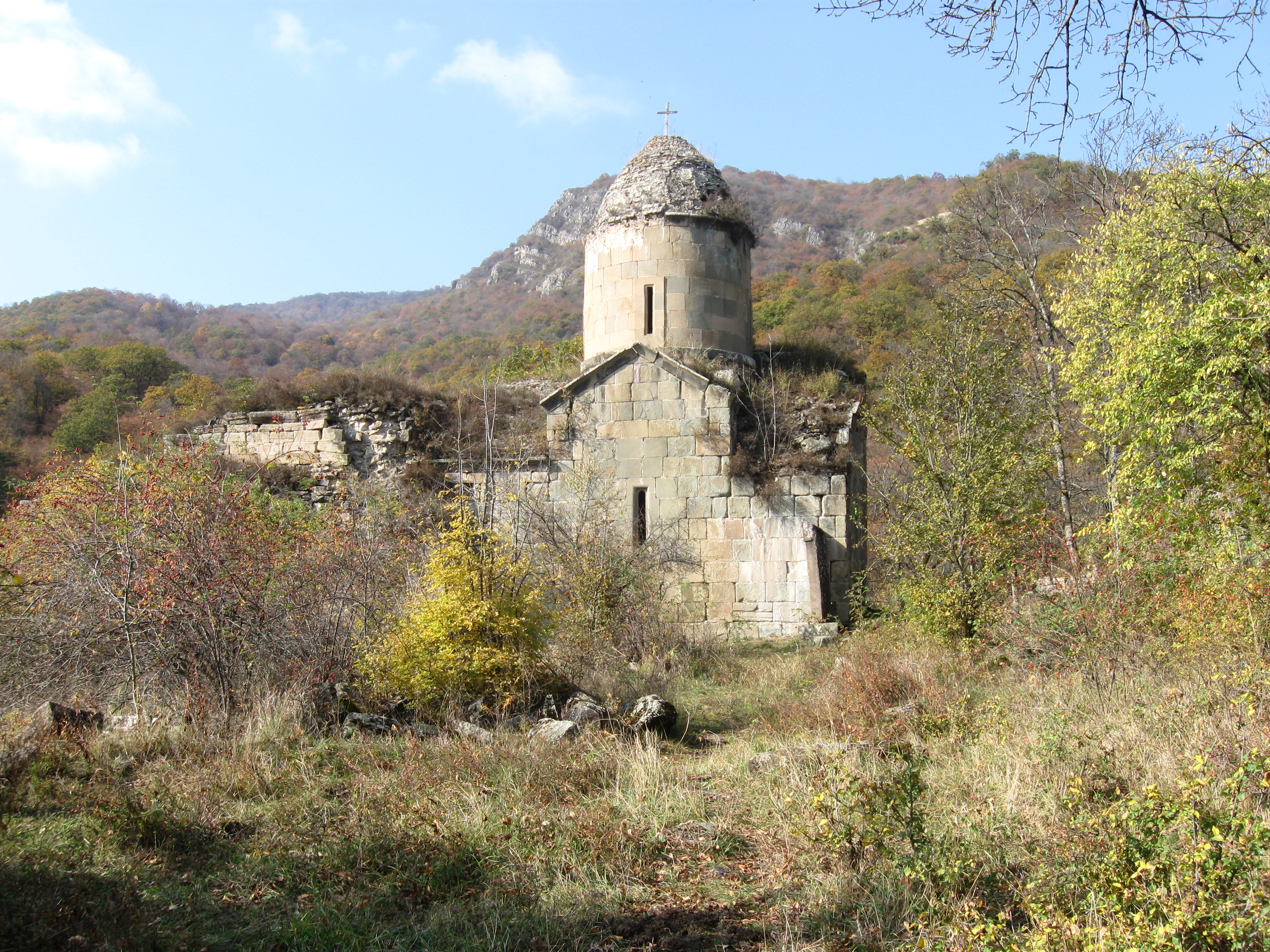
Arakelots Monastery

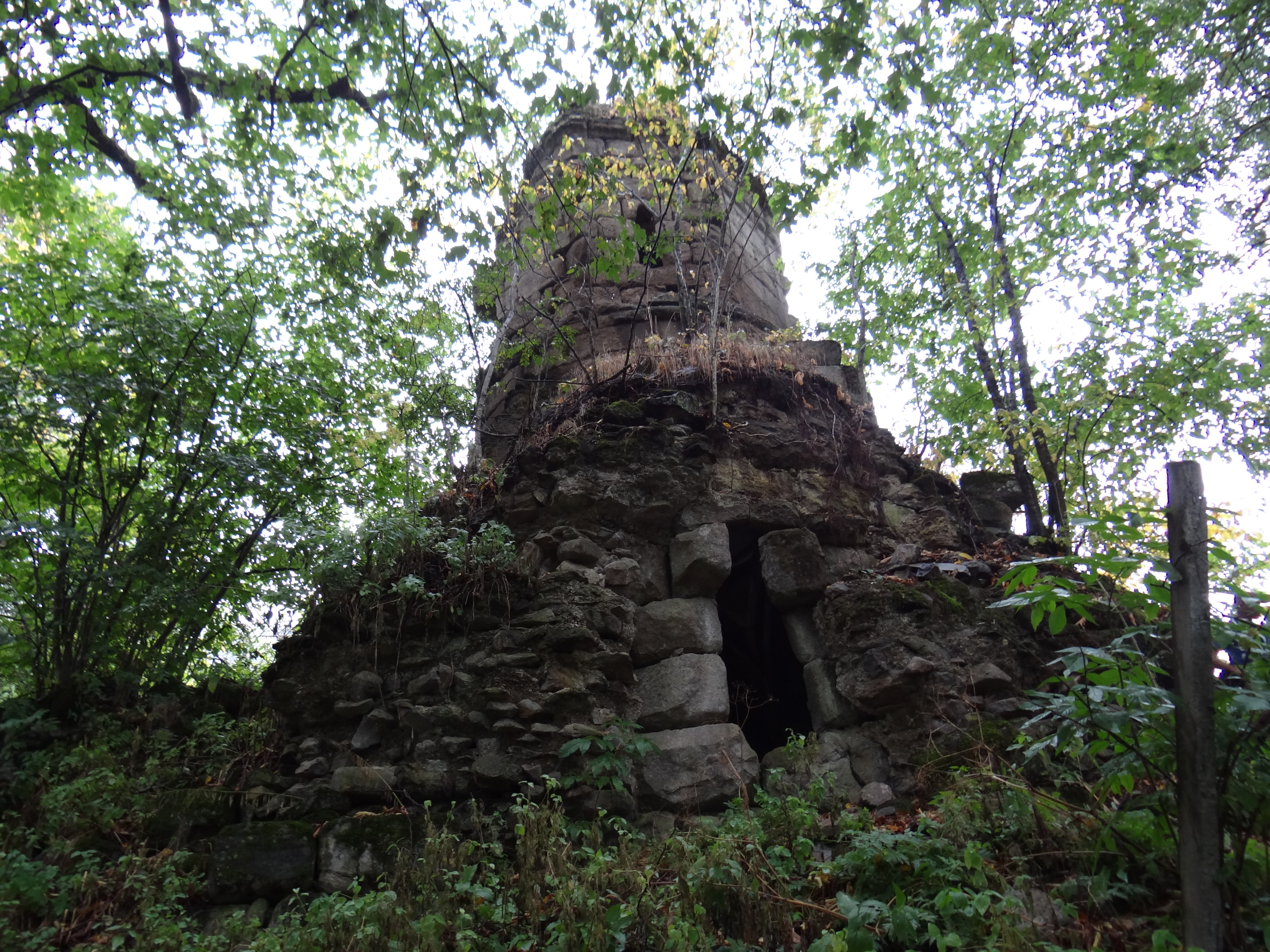
Samson Monastery

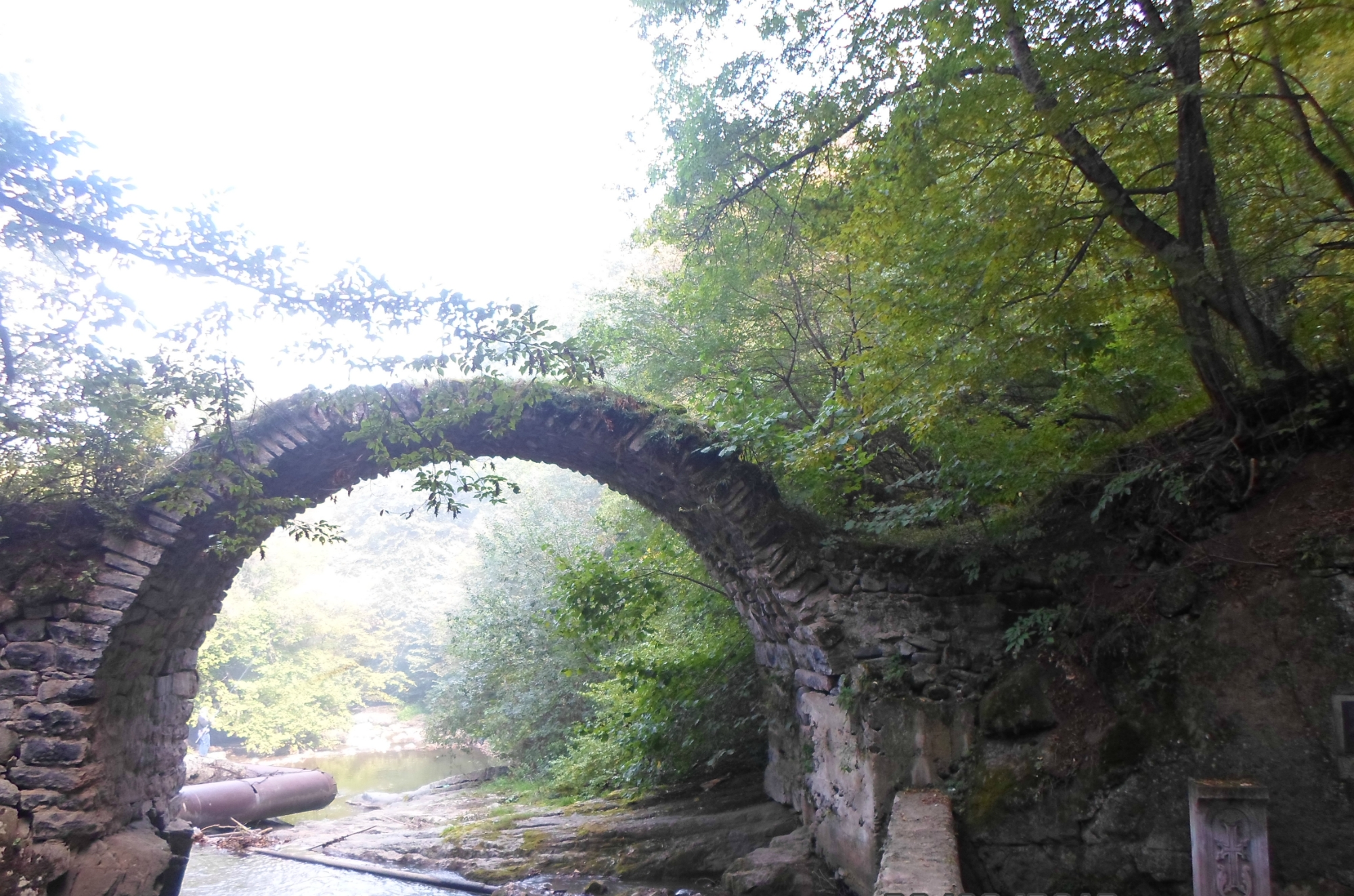
Sranots bridge

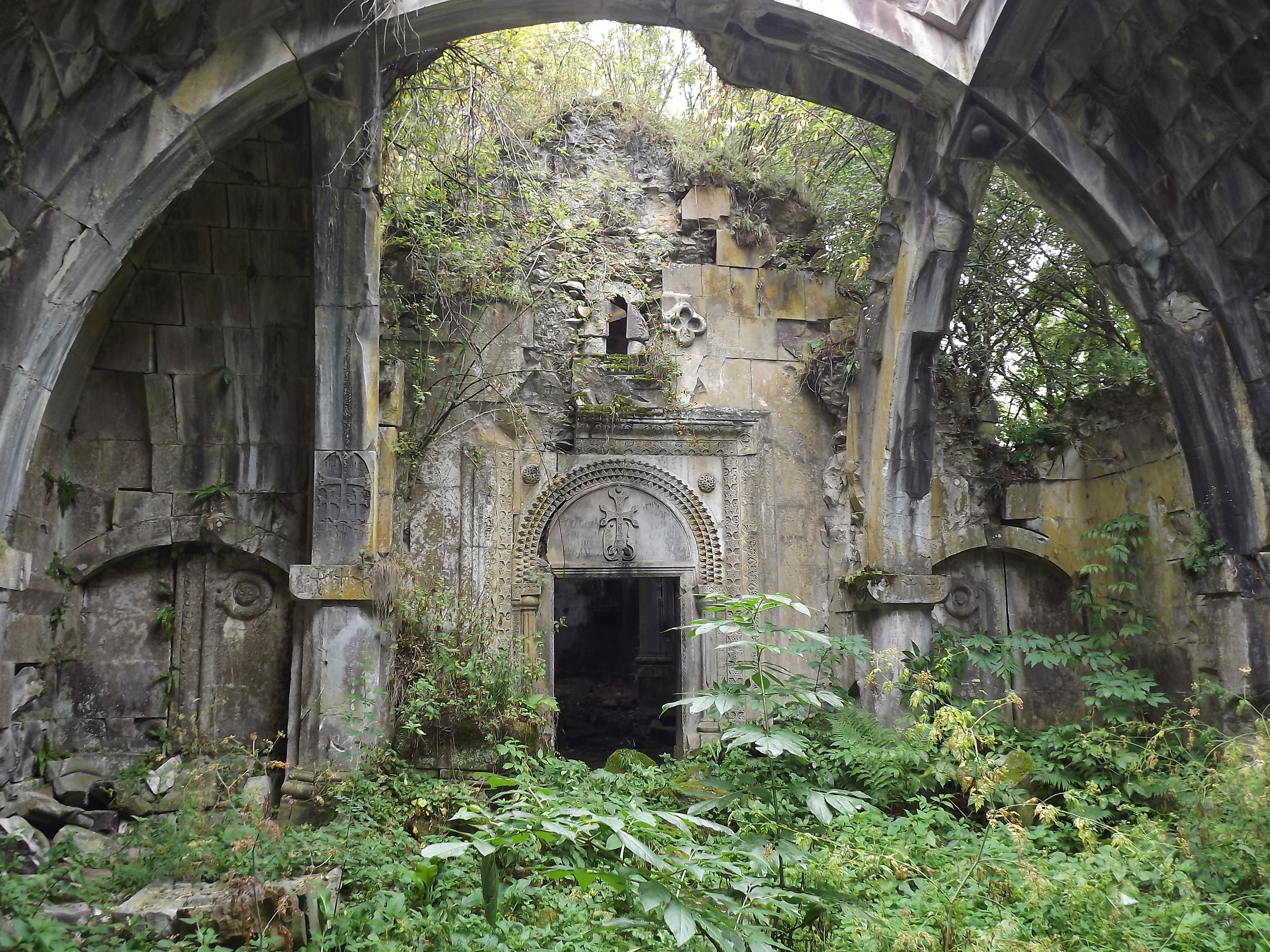
Deghdznut Monastery
