= Arakelots Monastery, Kirants =

Monastery near Kirants, Armenia

Arakelots Monastery
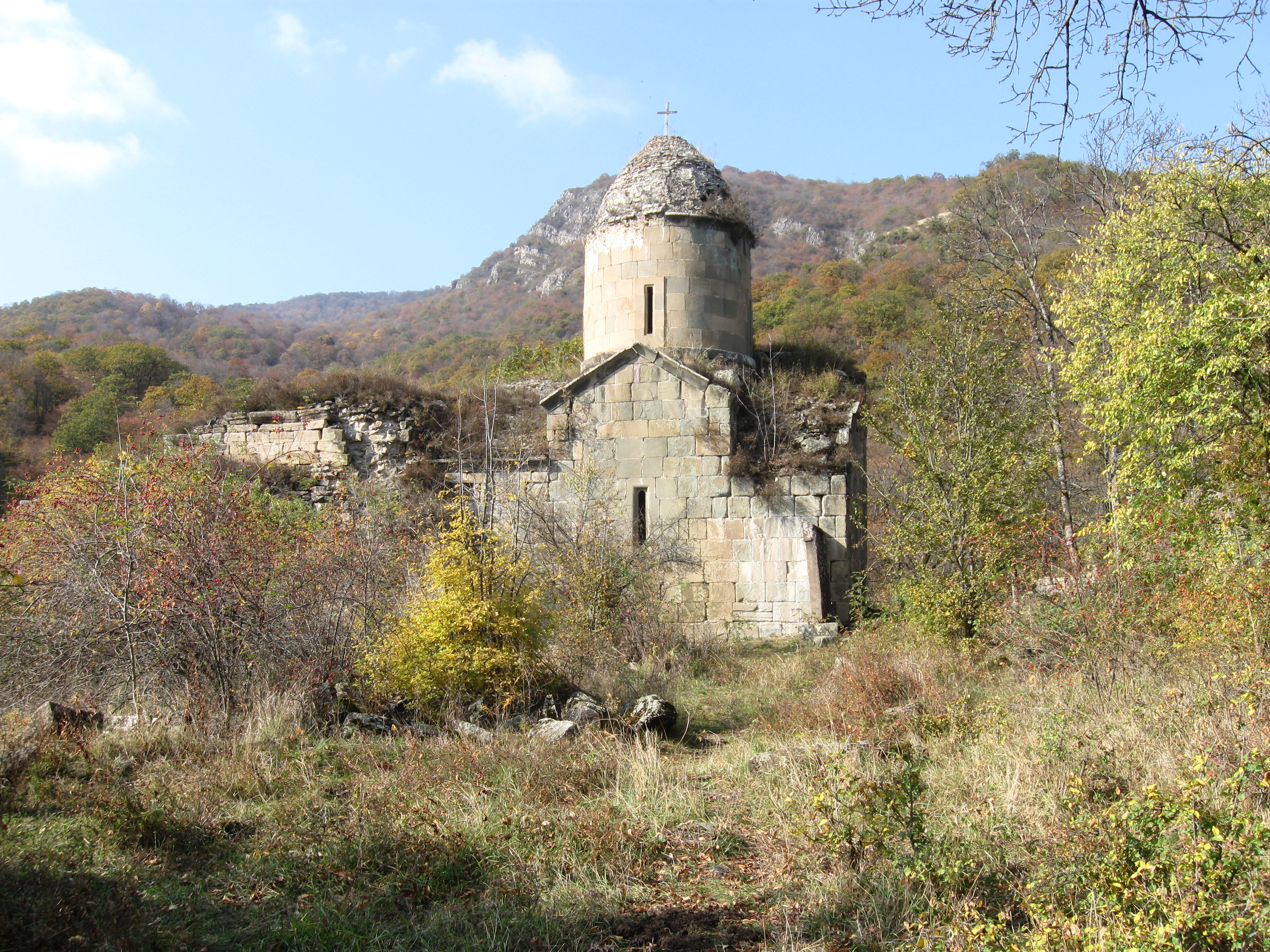
- Arakelots Vank

- Location within Armenia Location within Tavush

Religion
- Affiliation: Armenian Apostolic Church
- Status: Abandoned

Location
- Location: near Kirants, Tavush Province, Armenia
- Coordinates: 41.033878°N 45.066004°E

Architecture
- Type: Monastery
- Style: Armenian
- Completed: 13th century

Arakelots Monastery (Armenian: Առաքելոց վանք, romanized: Arakelots Vank; lit. 'Monastery of the Apostles') is a 13th-century monastery about 3 kilometres (2 mi) southwest of the village of Kirants in the Tavush Province of Armenia. The monastic complex sits upon the crest of a hill surrounded by a dense forest on the left bank of the Kunen River.

Approximately 80 metres (260 ft) downhill from the monastery are the ruins of a caravanserai. The ruins of a chapel sit on the next hill as well. Supposedly, two kilometers northeast of Arakelots Vank on a flat area on the mountain ridge is the little church and khachkar of Khndzorut.

== History ==
There are many destroyed villages and settlements in the valley of Aghstev river. They belong to various periods of our history. Arakelots monastery and village with its many spiritual and secular buildings are among such large settlements. They are located 3 km west of the village of Kirants (Getashen), on the slopes of forested mountains. In the Middle Ages, this valley and mountain slopes were densely populated. This is confirmed by the numerous remains of a number of settlements, architectural monuments, bridges, caravanserais and other structures. Due to its convenient geographical location, this region of Kayen province was a unique gateway for the trade routes of the neighboring countries, Georgia and Aghvank, which connected these countries with the economic, political and cultural centers of central Armenia. The only witnesses of their historical life are the inscriptions. A number of monuments have been preserved in the walled area of the Arakelots monastery-fortress and its surroundings.

== Architecture ==
The monastic complex consists of two churches: the smaller one belongs to the one-nave basilica type and the larger one to the domed hall type. Approximately 80 m below is a caravanserai. Two kilometers to the northeast is the Khndzorut small church.

=== The main church ===
The church was built at the northern end of the castle, next to the standing wall. It is a small-sized structure covered externally with milky, yellow and blue hewn stones, and plastered with lime on the inside. External dimensions are 10.25 meters x 7.45 meters. It has a tall, round drum and a dome with a pointed top. It does not have any decorations or inscriptions on the outside or inside.

== Gallery ==
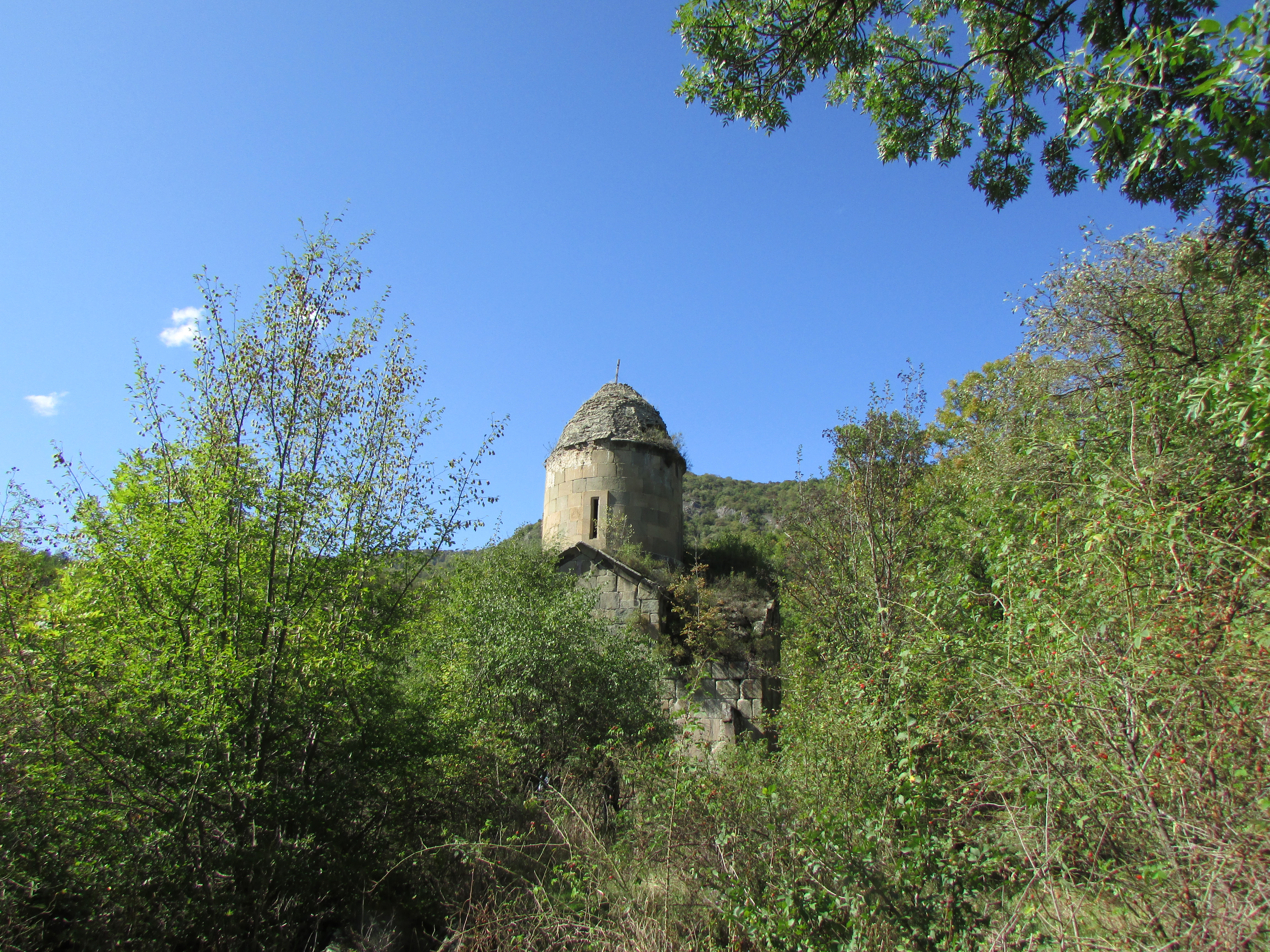

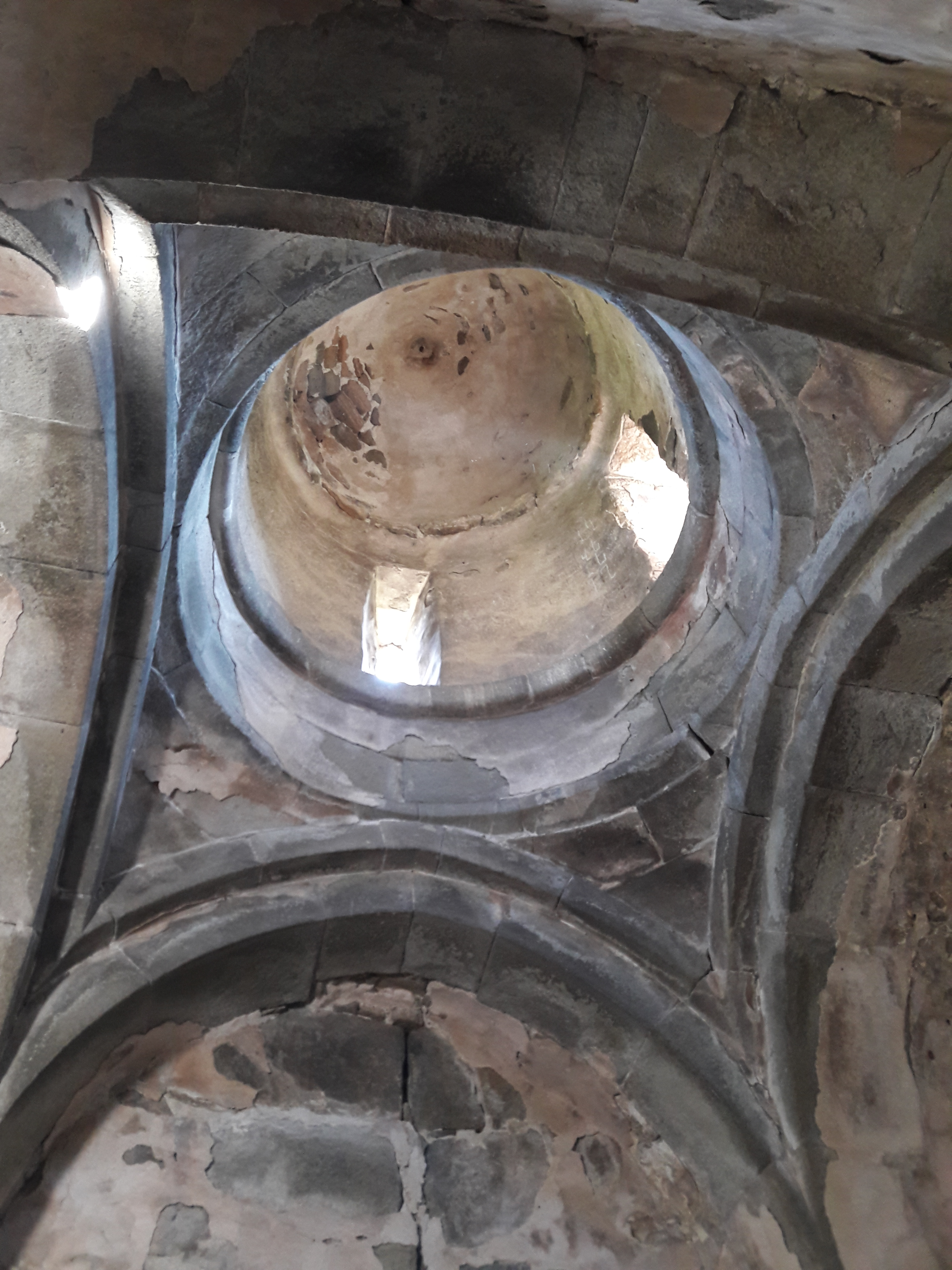

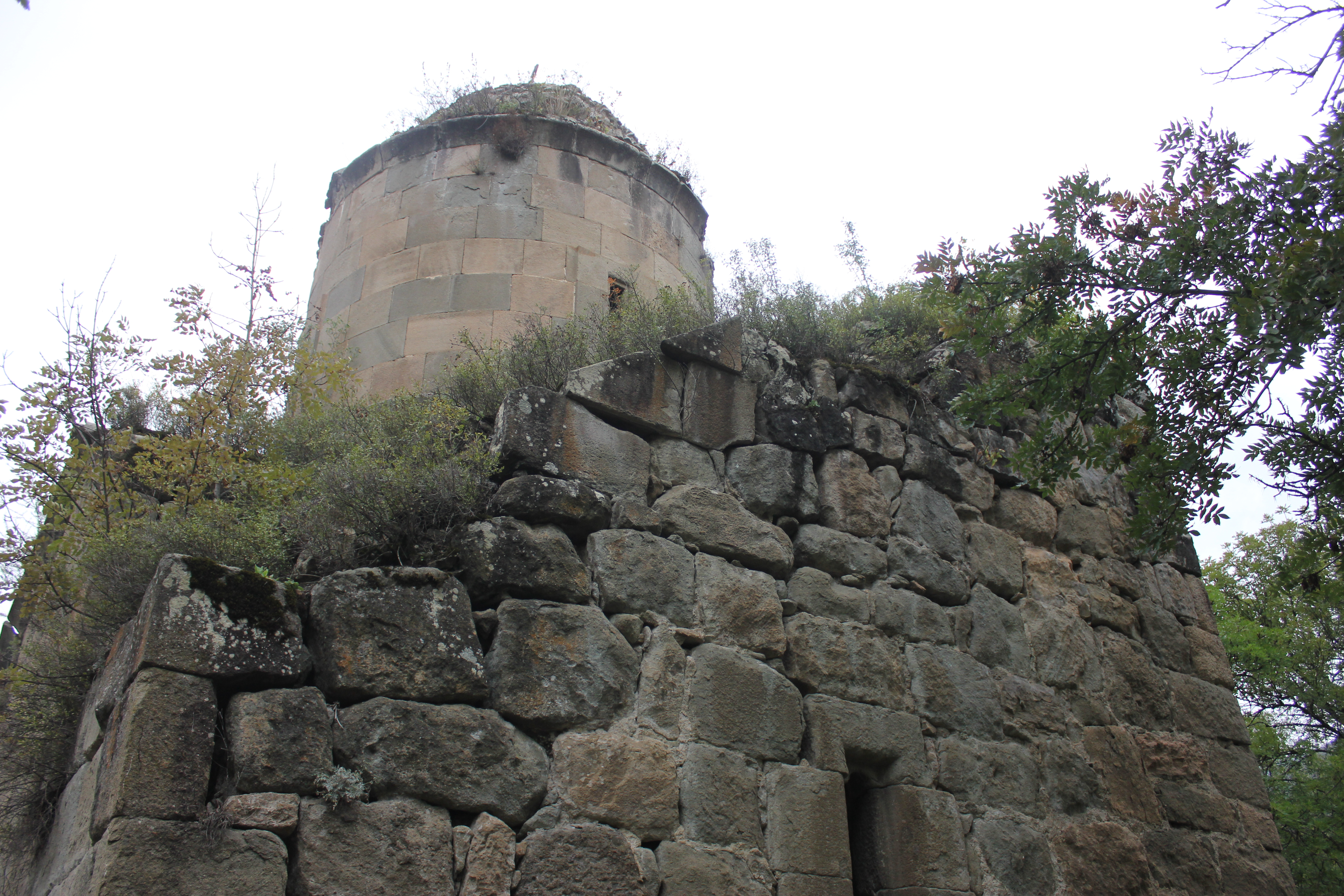

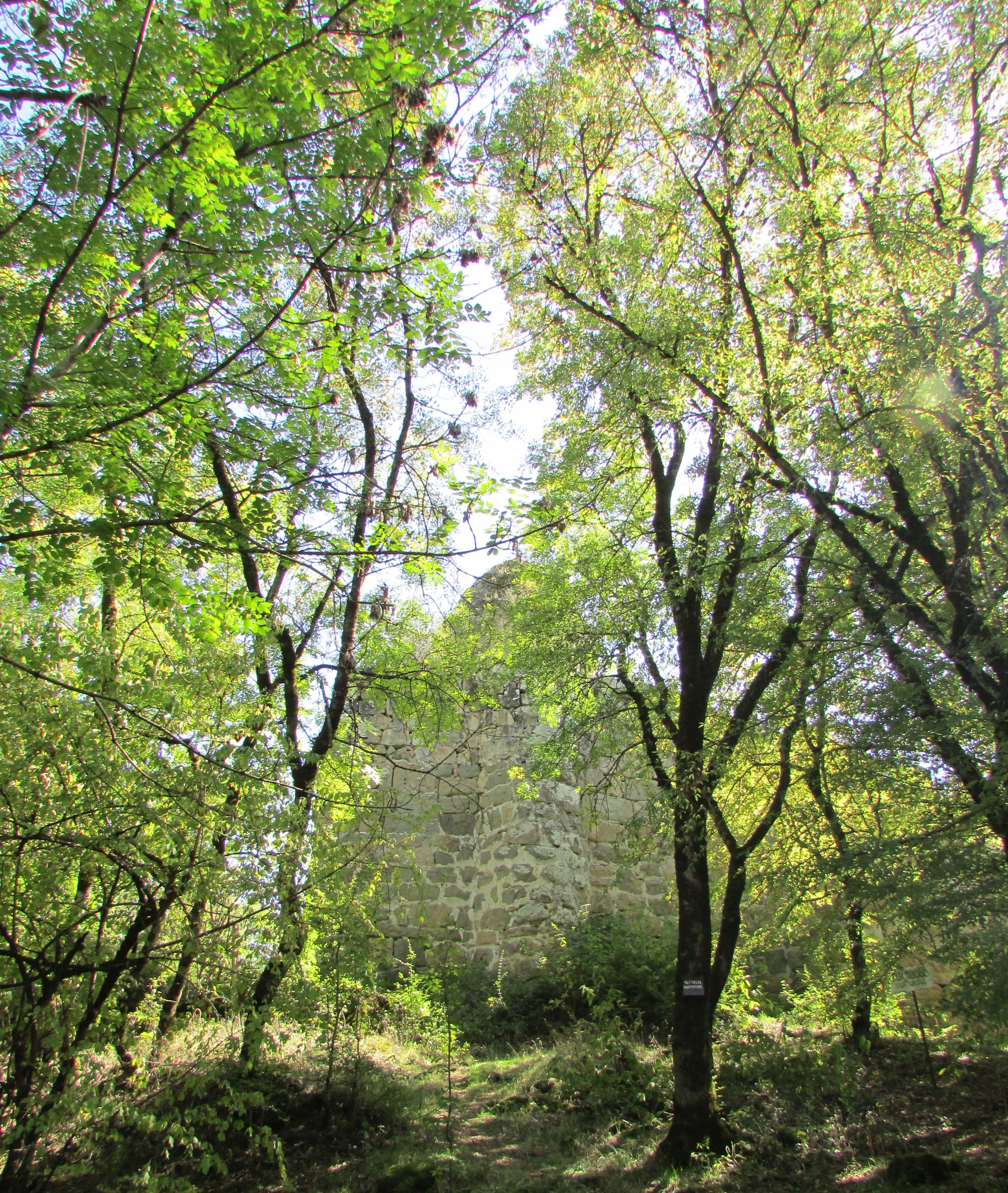

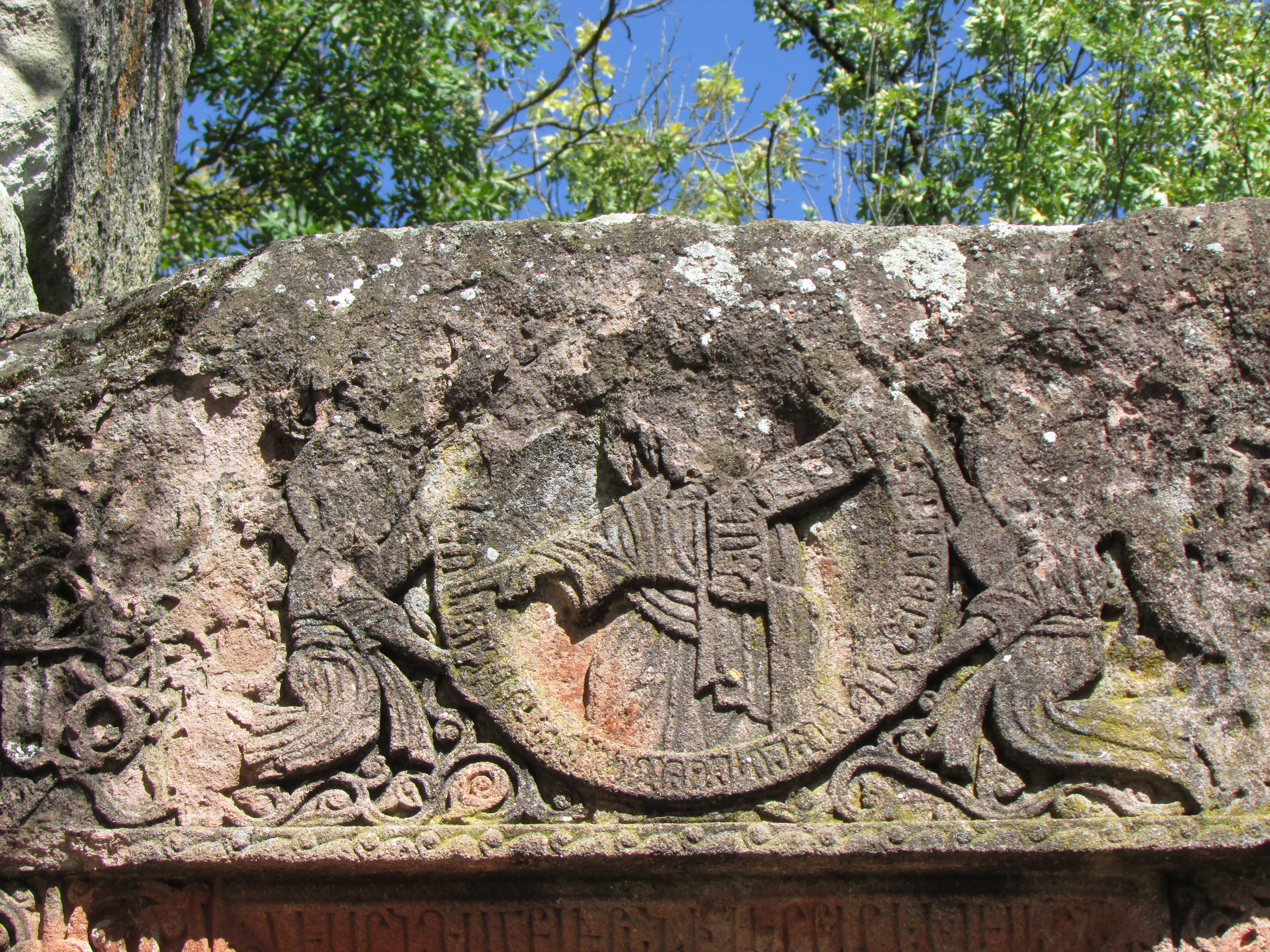

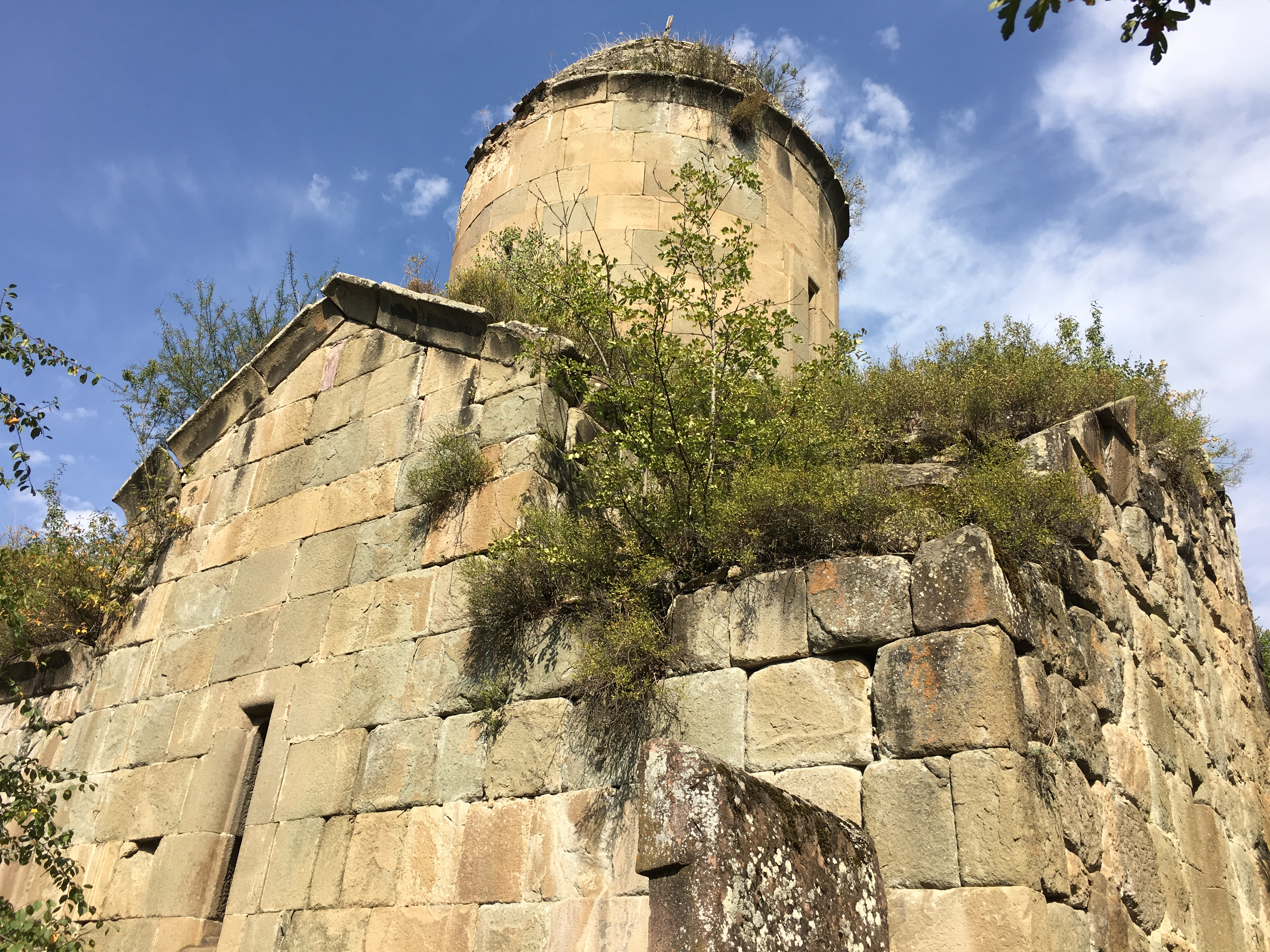

== See also ==
- Kirants Monastery which is a further 7 kilometres (4 mi) southwest in the same valley
