= Georgian Orthodox Church in Armenia =

Eparchies of the Georgian Apostolic Autocephalous Orthodox Church as of 2010

This is an incomplete list of Georgian Orthodox churches in Armenia.

The list includes churches and monasteries of Georgian origin which were moved into the territory of the Armenian Soviet Socialist Republic after 1921 border changes between Armenia and Georgia caused by sovietization, and are now located in Armenia. Georgian churches in Armenia are under the jurisdiction of the Dmanisi and Agarak-Tashiri Eparchy based in Georgia.

Church name	Picture	Status	Short description	Coordinates
Koberi Monastery		partially ruined	Originally an Armenian monastery which later was transformed into a Chalcedonian monastery and is now under the tutelage of the Georgian Orthodox Church.	41.005061°N 44.635086°E
Khujabi Monastery		inactive	State ownership is disputed. According to the official Tbilisi it is located on the territory which is part of Georgian state. However, the nearby section of Georgian-Armenian border is controlled by Armenian military.	41.21083°N 44.57333°E
Akhtala Monastery		under jurisdiction AAC		41.150278°N 44.764167°E
Hnevank		under jurisdiction AAC		40.952953°N 44.58425°E
Kirants Monastery		partially ruined		41.011895°N 44.990336°E
Akori church		ruins		41.106169°N 44.607828°E
Sedvi Monastery		inactive	The monastery is located on the left side of the road leading from Akori to Kachachkuti. Judging by its architectural features, the church must be dated to the 13th century.	41.096806°N 44.586030°E
Tejharuyk Monastery		inactive		40.597816°N 44.644806°E
Oskipari		inactive	According to Vakhushti it was located in the gorge of river Aghstev. The church was built in the 14th-15th centuries. There are several Georgian inscriptions on frescoes.	
The so-called lower church of Metsavan (Georgian: Shanazari, Shakhnaziri)		inactive		41.201302°N 44.226978°E

== See also ==
- Georgian Orthodox Church
- Religion in Armenia
