= Kirants =

Kirants may refer to:

- Kiranti people, or Kirants, an ethnic group of India and Nepal
- Kirants, Armenia, a village in Armenia
