= Khndzorut =

Khndzorut may refer to:

- Khndzorut, Lori, Armenia
- Khndzorut, Vayots Dzor, Armenia
