= Hnevank =

Monastery in Lori Province, Armenia

Hnevank Հնեվանք
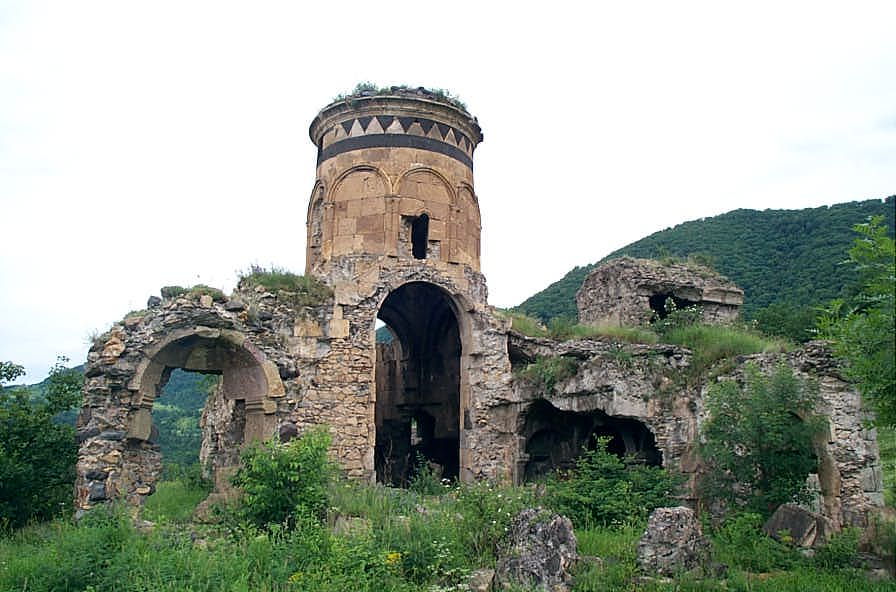
- Hnevank before reconstruction.

- Location within Armenia

Religion
- Affiliation: Armenian Apostolic Church
- Region: Lori

Location
- Location: near Kurtan, Lori Province, Armenia
- Coordinates: 40.952953°N 44.58425°E

Architecture
- Style: Armenian
- Completed: 7th-12th century

Hnevank (Armenian: Հնեվանք; meaning "Old Monastery") is a 7th-12th century Armenian Apostolic Church monastery, located near the village of Kurtan in the Lori Province of Armenia. The monastery is situated on a hill within a gorge, near where the Dzoraget and Gargar rivers join.

The monastery was entirely rebuilt by lord Smbat of the House of Orbelian, a branch of the Liparitids who were expelled from Georgia and into Armenia in the late 12th century. Liparitids were themselves a branch of the Mamikonians. Smbat was the ancestor of the Armenian princes of Syunik. A Georgian inscription around the drum attests his name.

The monastery has a gavit and various service buildings scattered around the site.

The government of Armenia has recently begun renovating the monastery. The collapsed dome of the main church has been restored entirely.

== Gallery ==
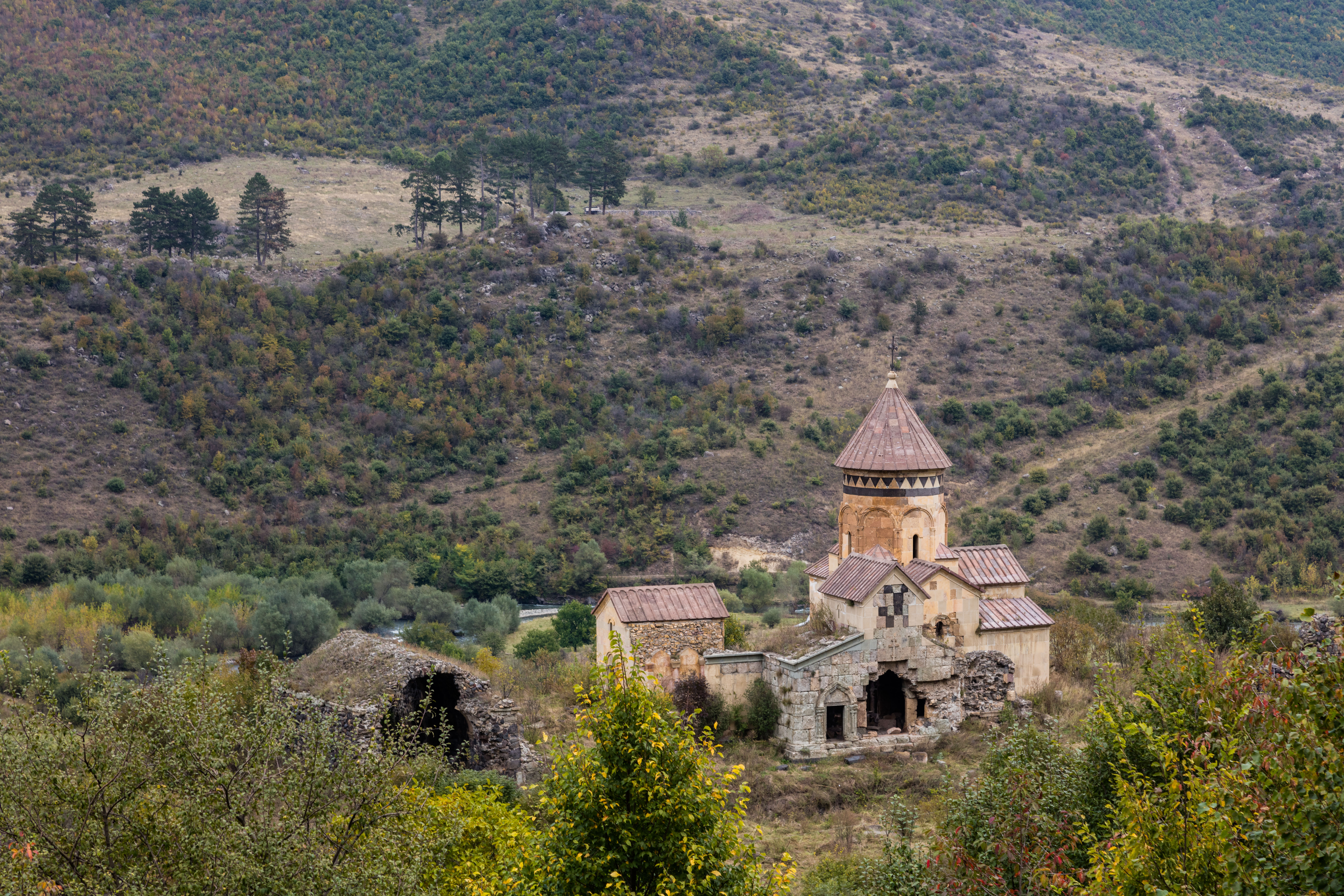
Hnevank after reconstruction.

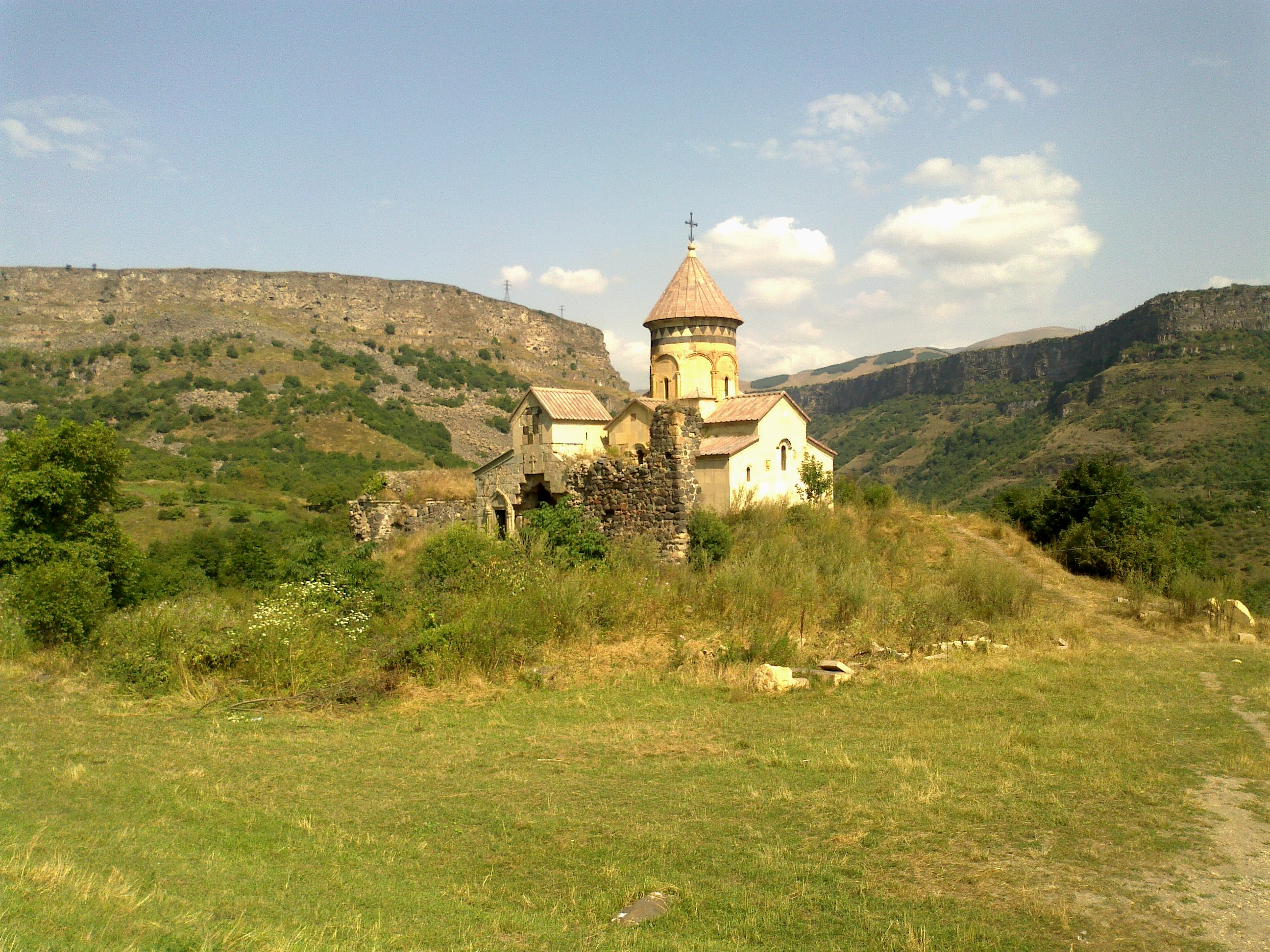

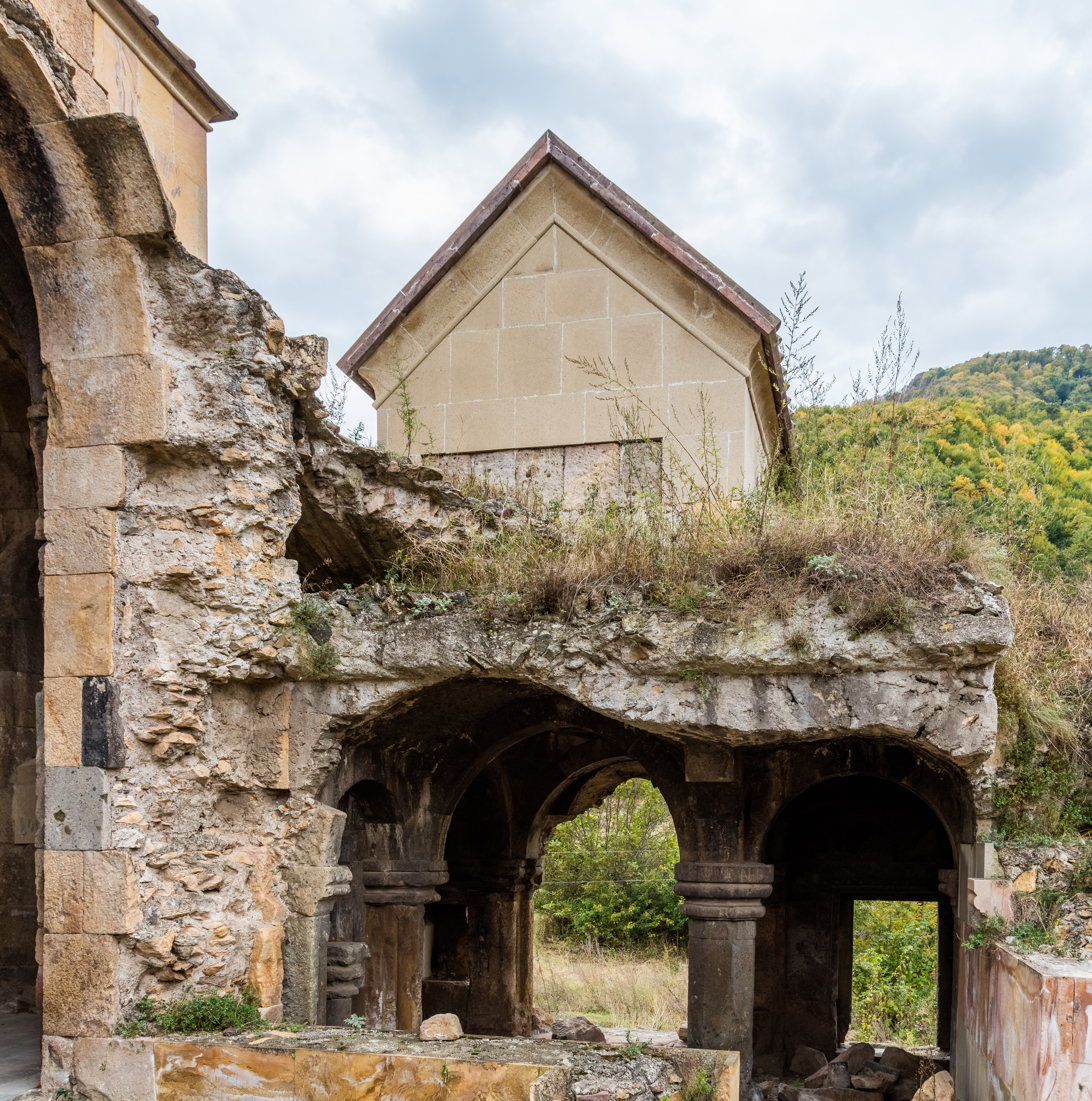

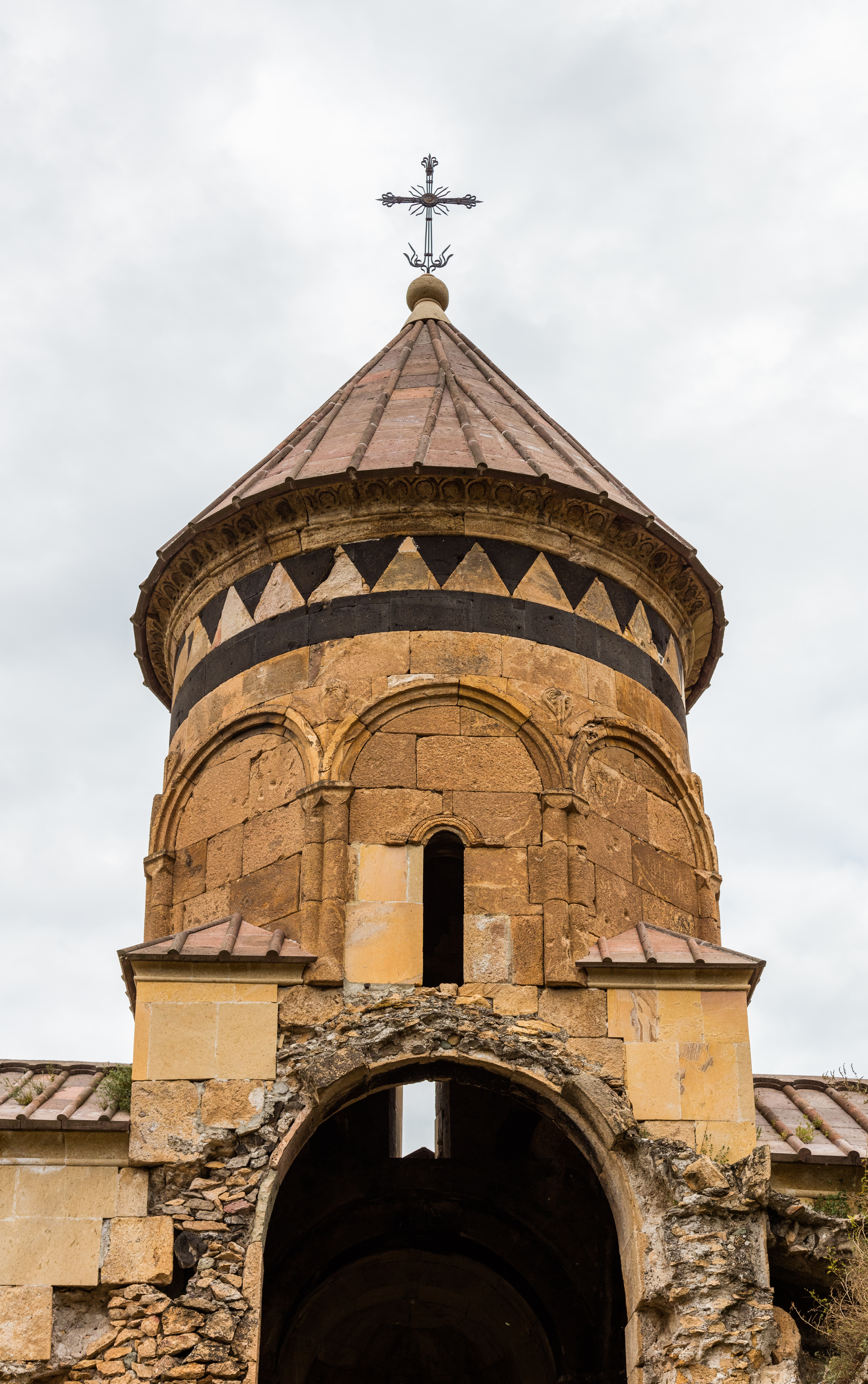
