= Kurtan =

Kurtan Կուրթան
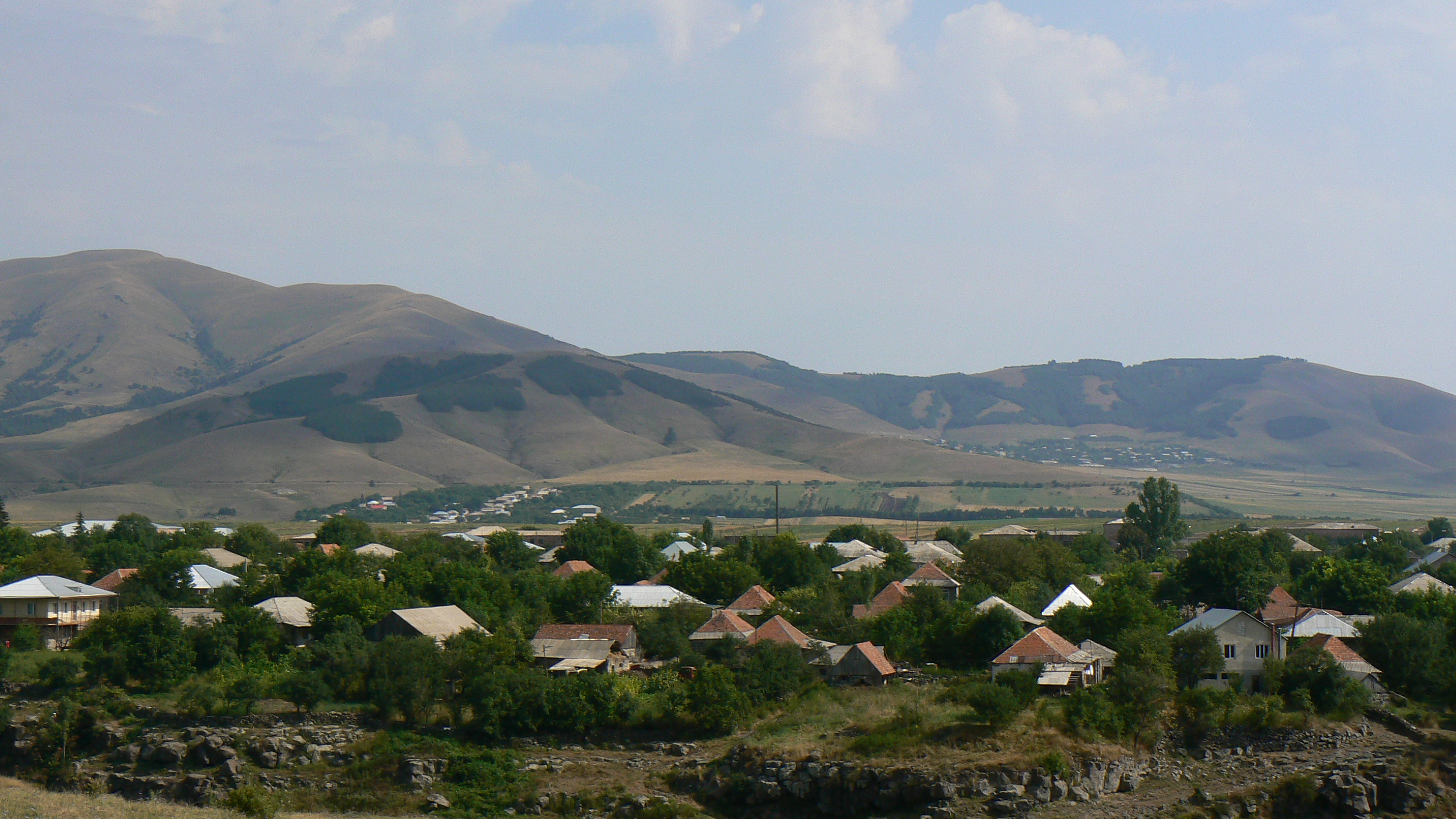

- Location within Armenia
- Coordinates: 40°57′43″N 44°33′59″E
- Country: Armenia
- Province: Lori
- Elevation: 1,260 m (4,130 ft)

Population (2011)
  - Total: 2,117
- Time zone: UTC+4 (AMT)

Kurtan (Armenian: Կուրթան) is a village in the Lori Province of Armenia.

== Gallery ==
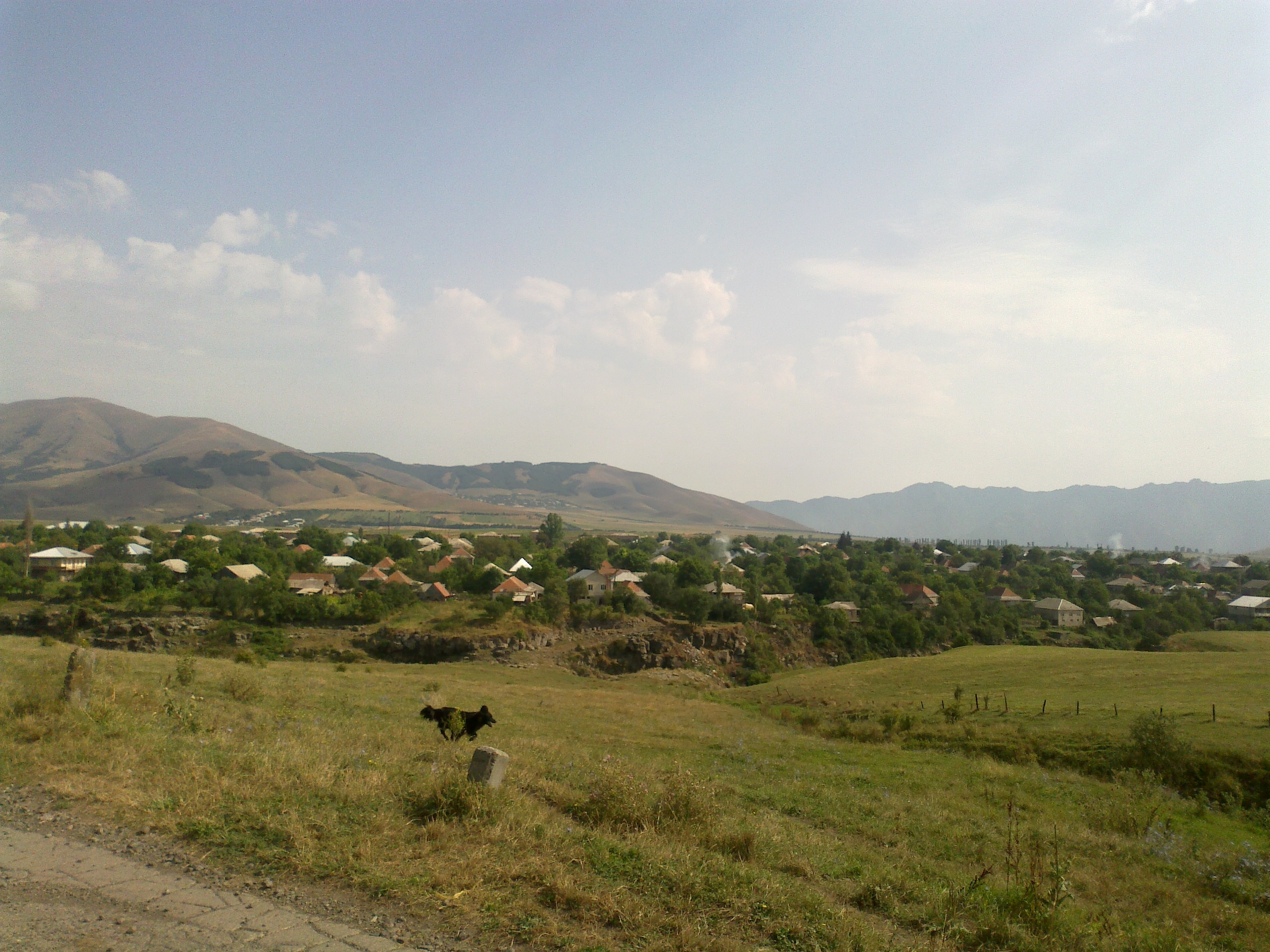

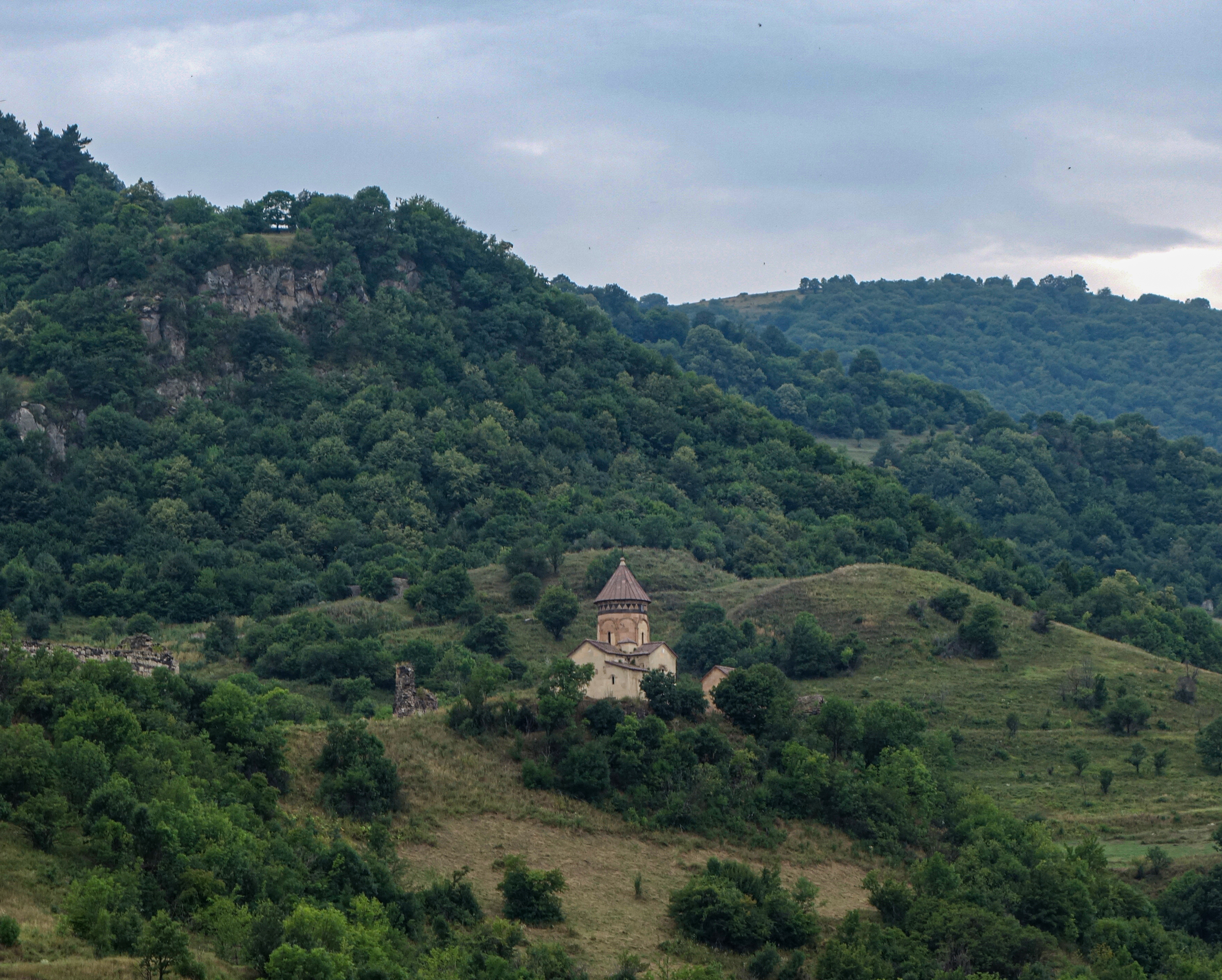

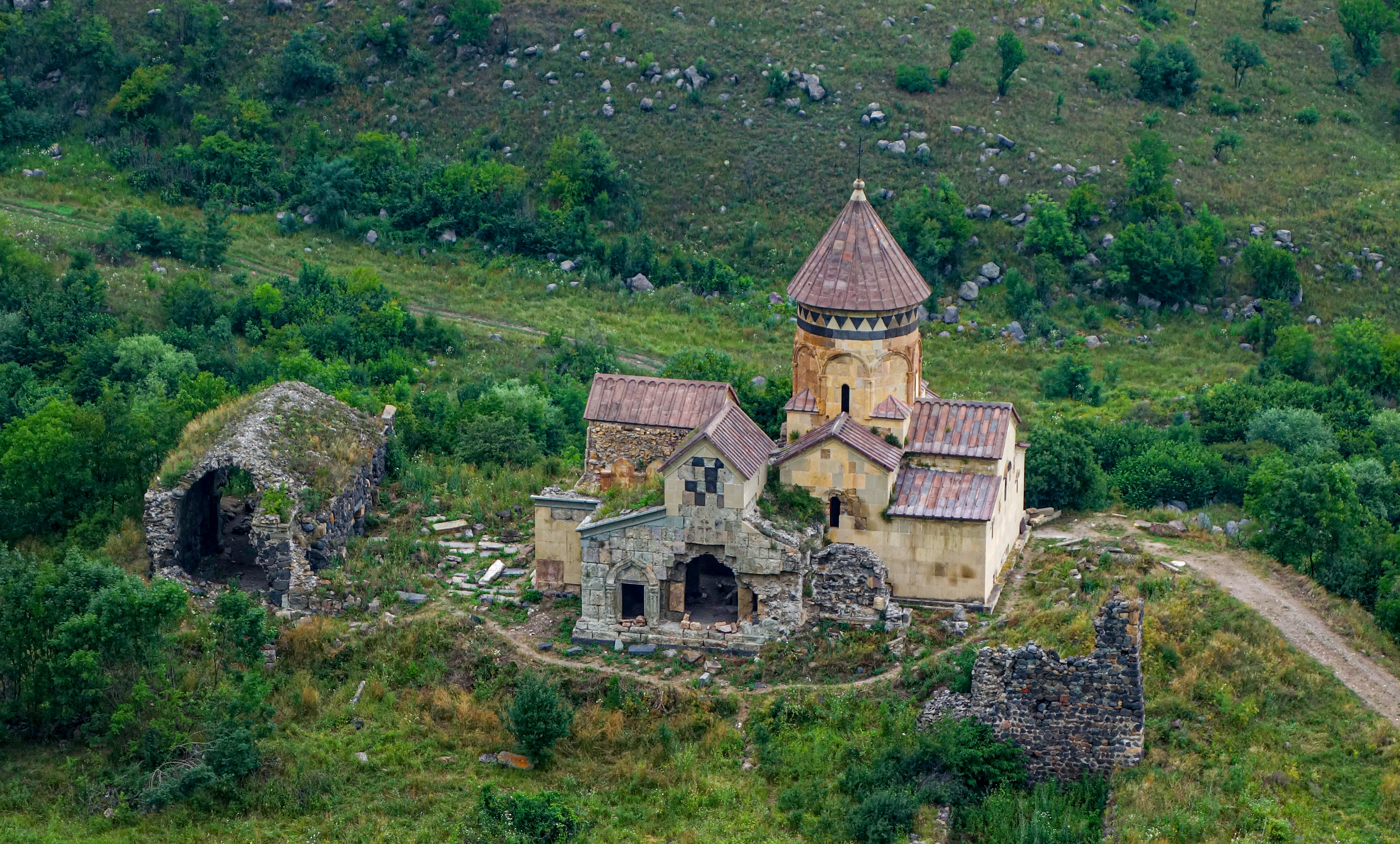

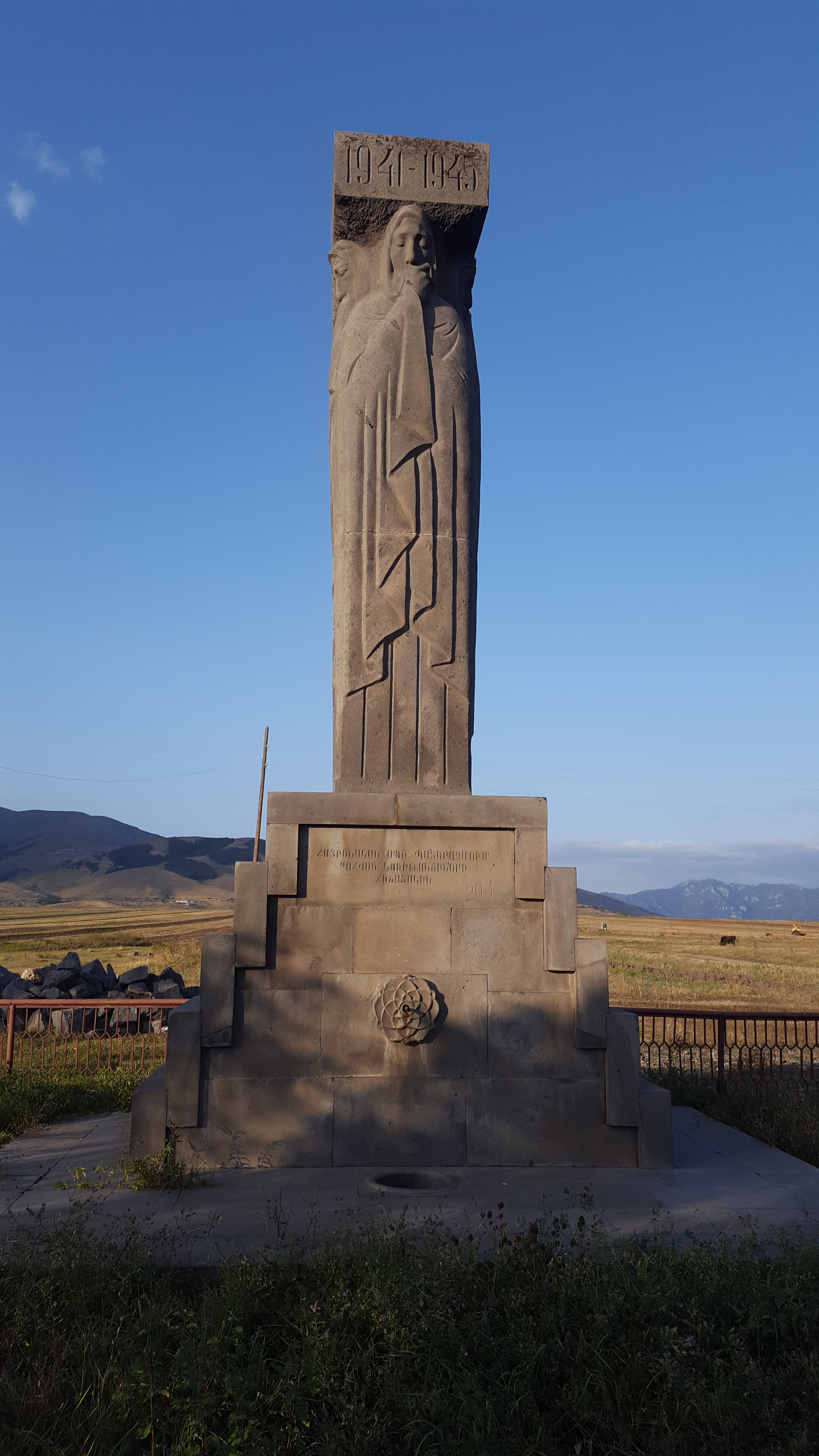

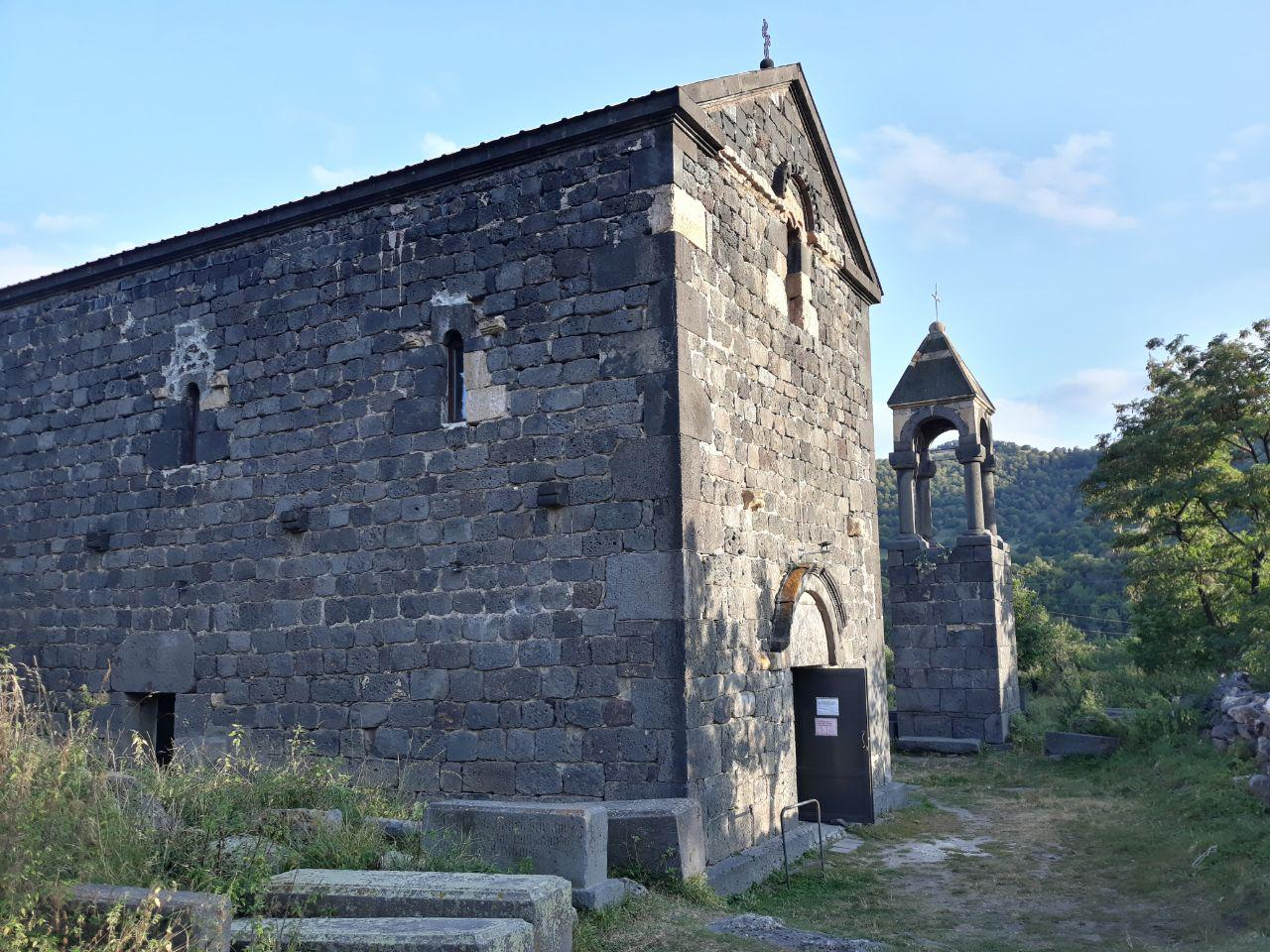
