= Kirants Monastery =

13th-century Armenian monastery

Kirants Monastery Կիրանց Վանք
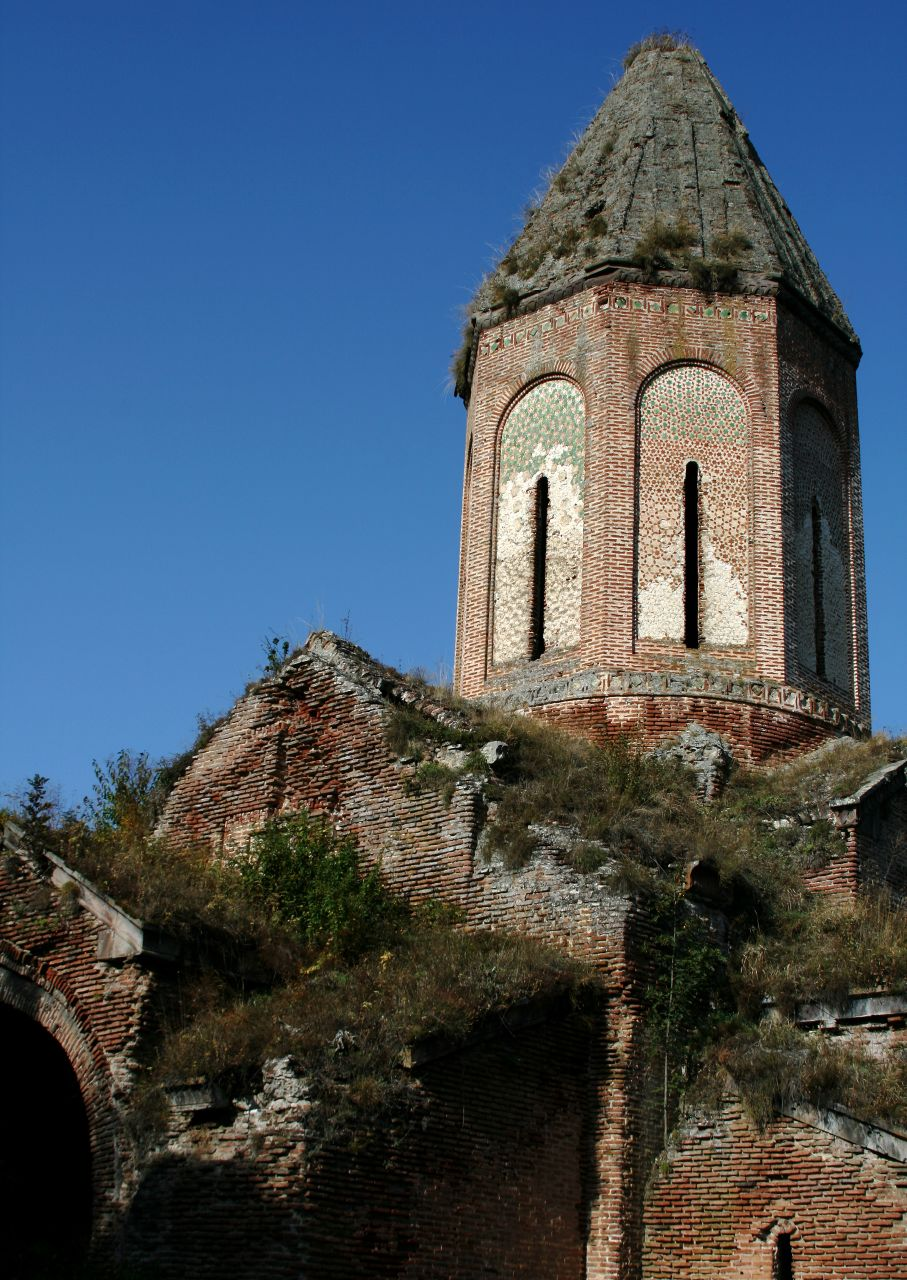
- The drum and dome of Kirants.

- Location within Armenia Location within Tavush

Religion
- Affiliation: Armenian Apostolic Church

Location
- Location: 10 km SW of Kirants, Tavush Province, Armenia
- Coordinates: 41.011895°N 44.990336°E

Architecture
- Style: Armenian
- Completed: 13th century

Kirants Monastery is a 13th-century Armenian monastery located about 10 kilometers southwest of Kirants village in the Tavush Province of Armenia. The Georgian Orthodox Church in Armenia has laid claim to the monastery, which the Armenian Apostolic Church rejects.

The Kirants Monastery was most likely founded by the Zakarid ruler Avag Zakarian, who was of Chalcedonian faith. The frescoes of the monastery are from the 1230s-1240s.

== Gallery ==
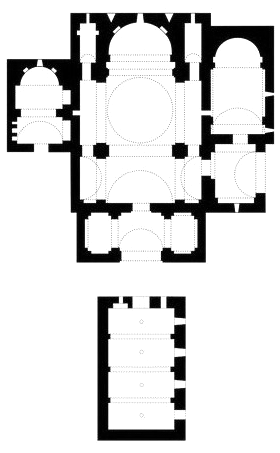
Plan of Kirants Monastery

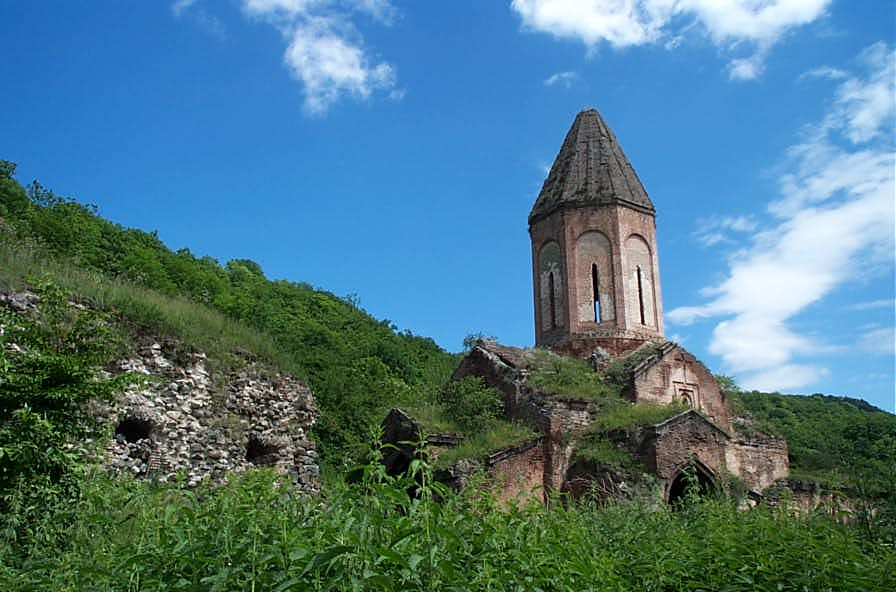
Kirants Monastery

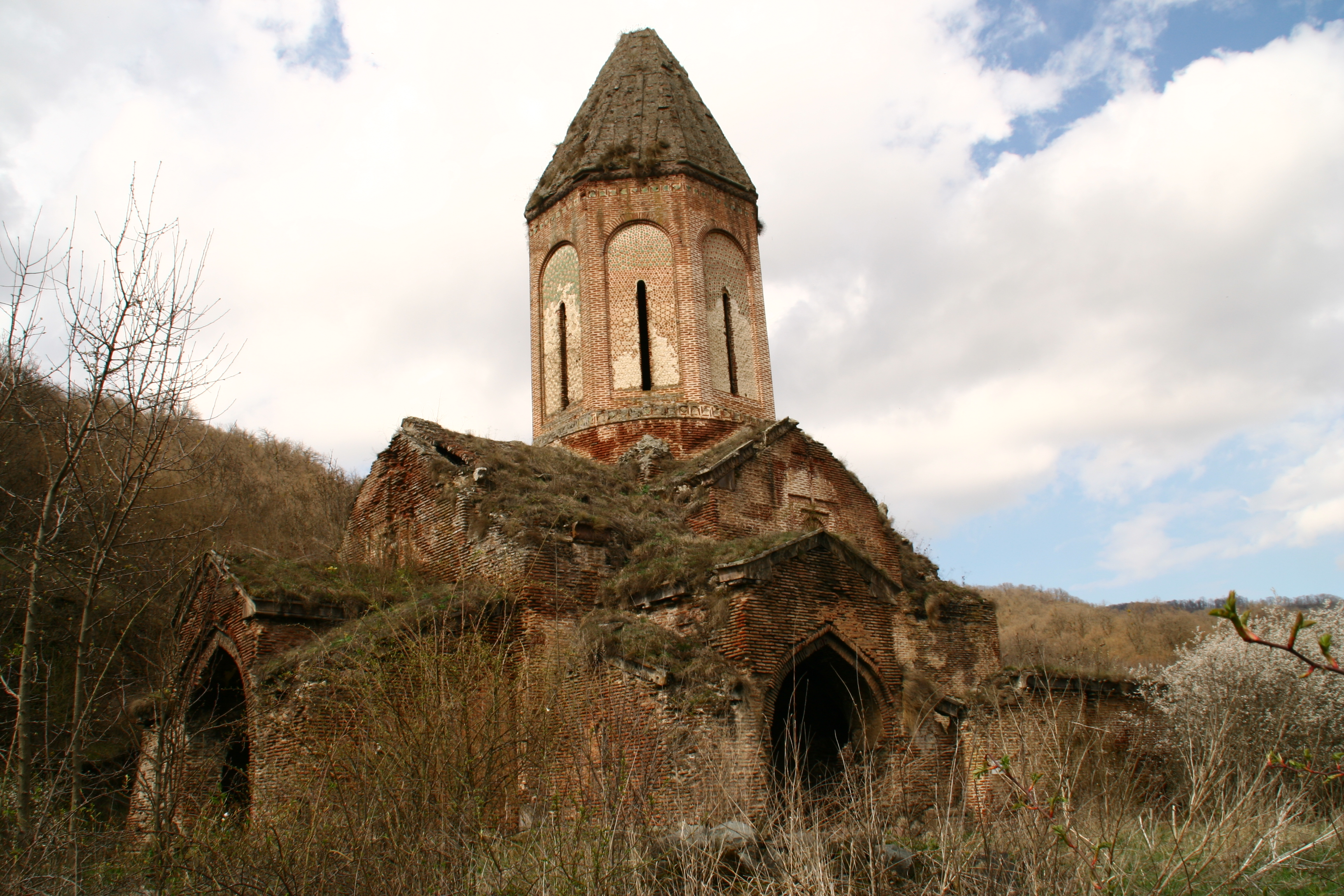

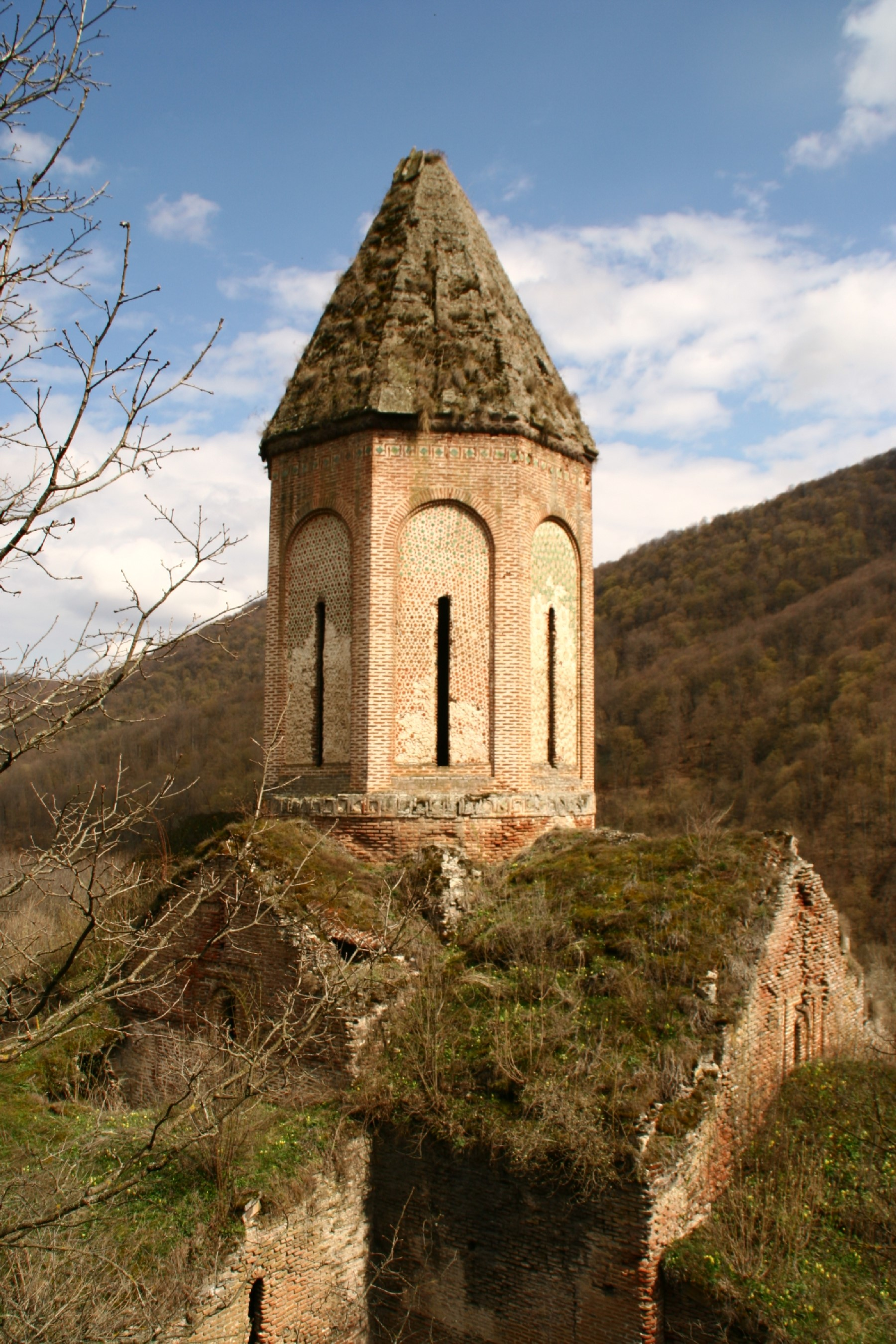

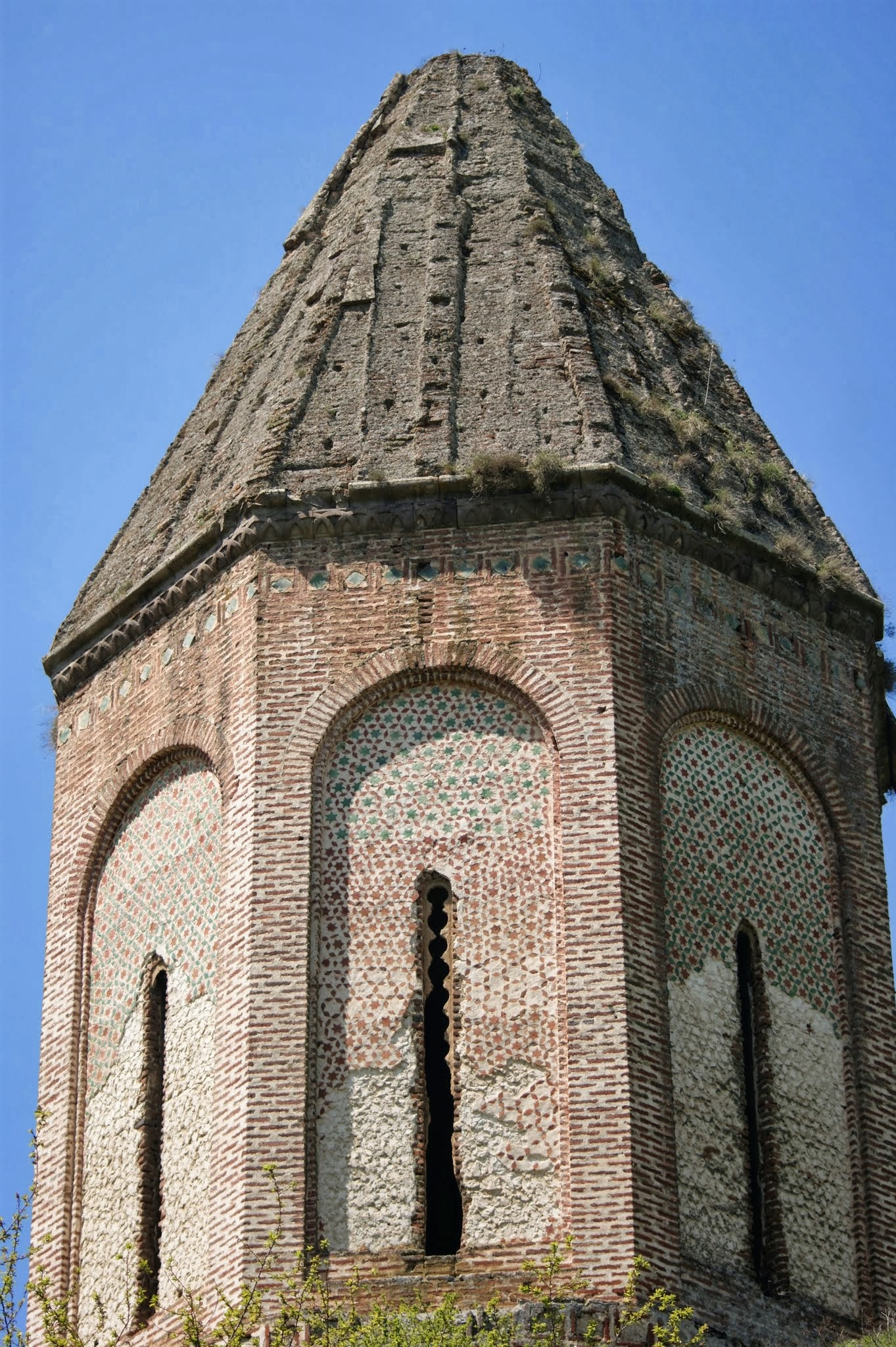
Drum and dome

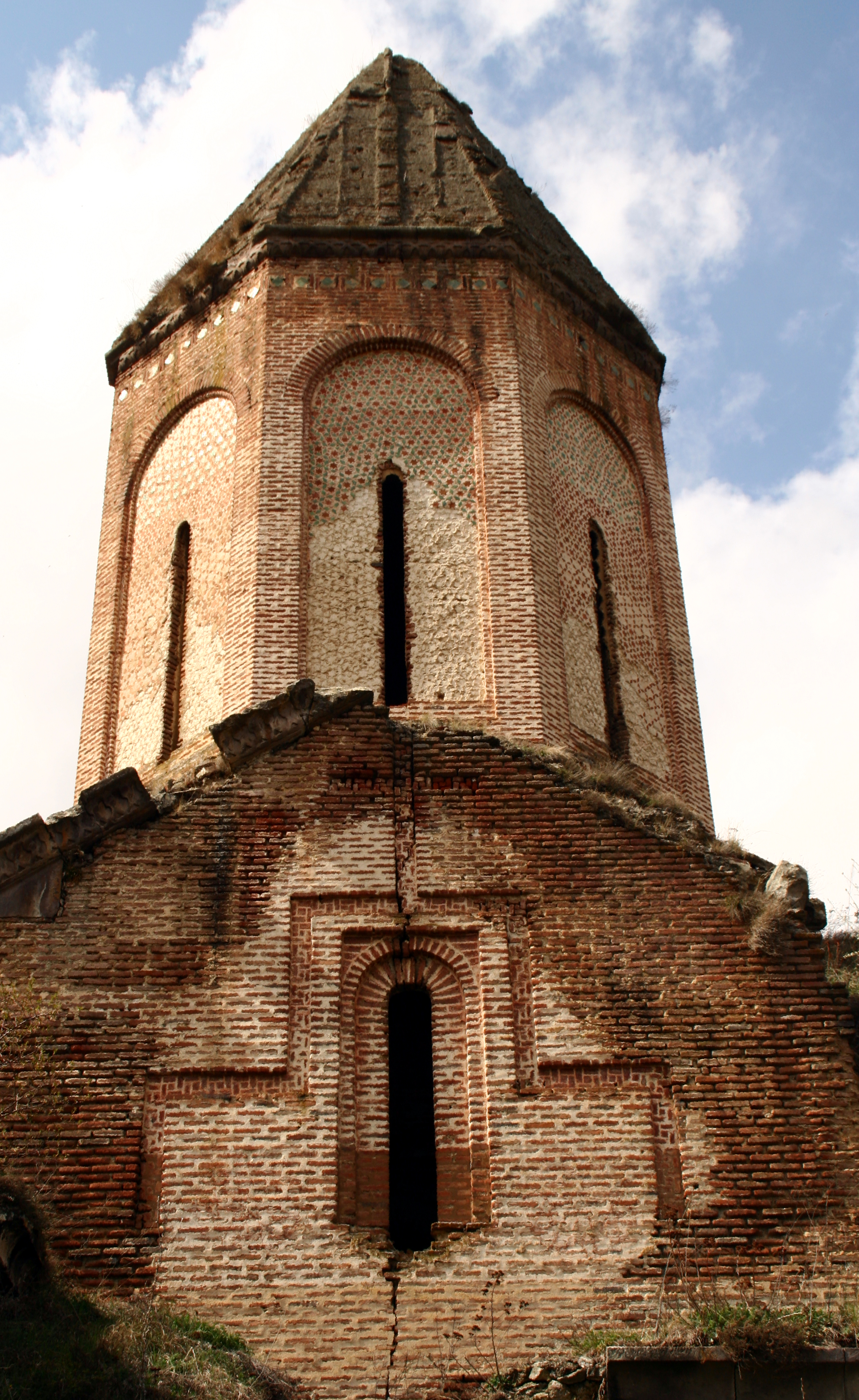

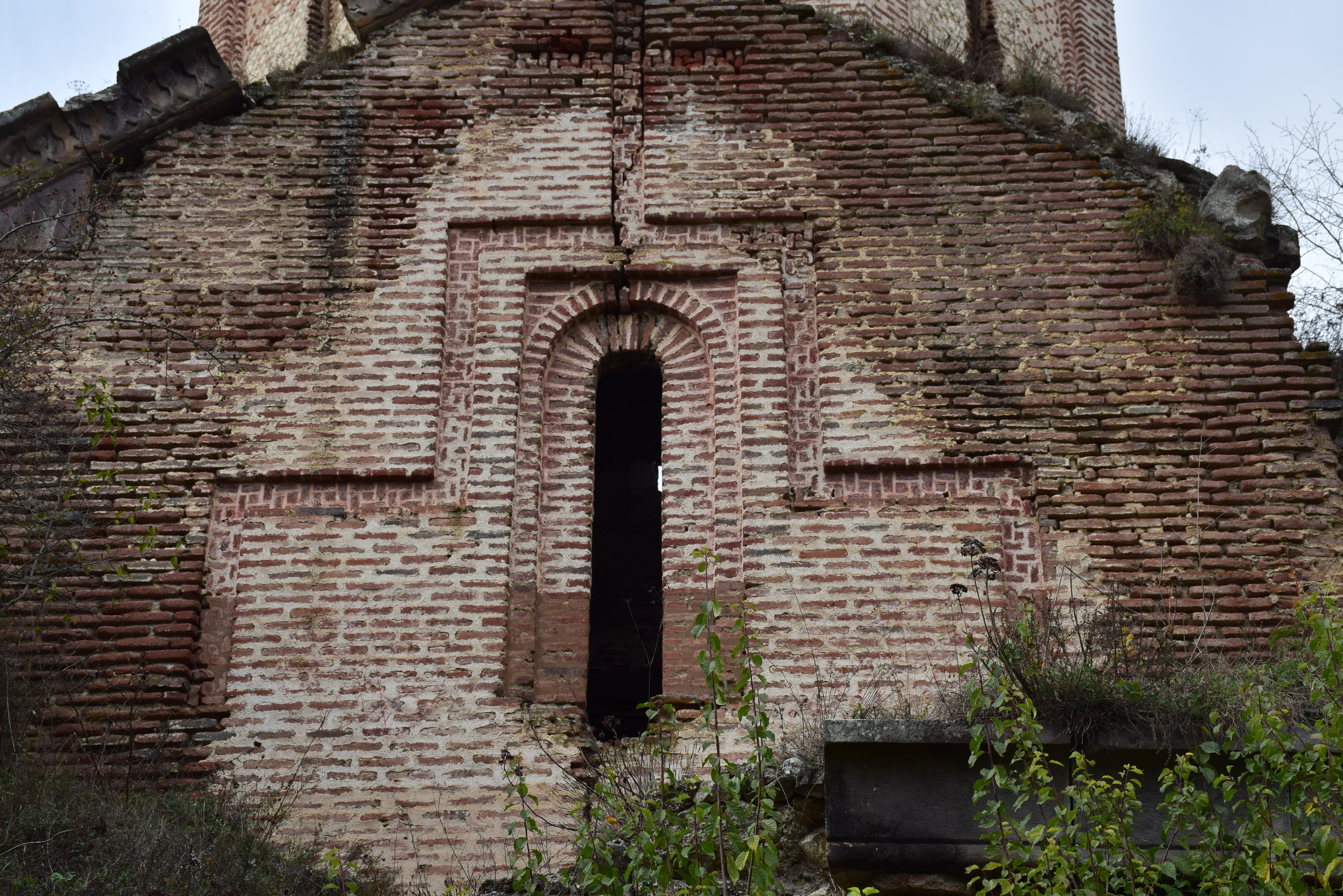

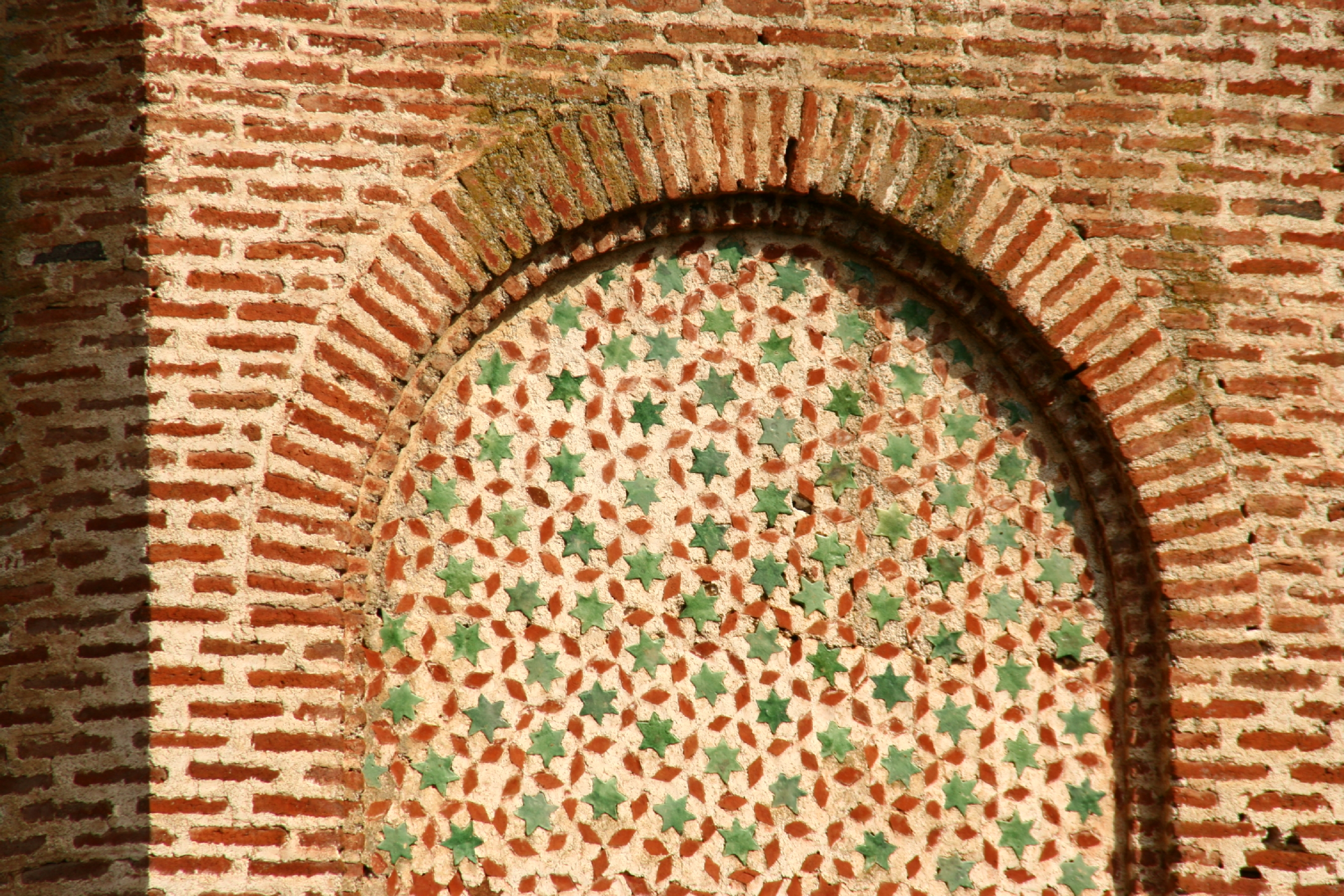
Detail of the mosaics tiles on around the drum

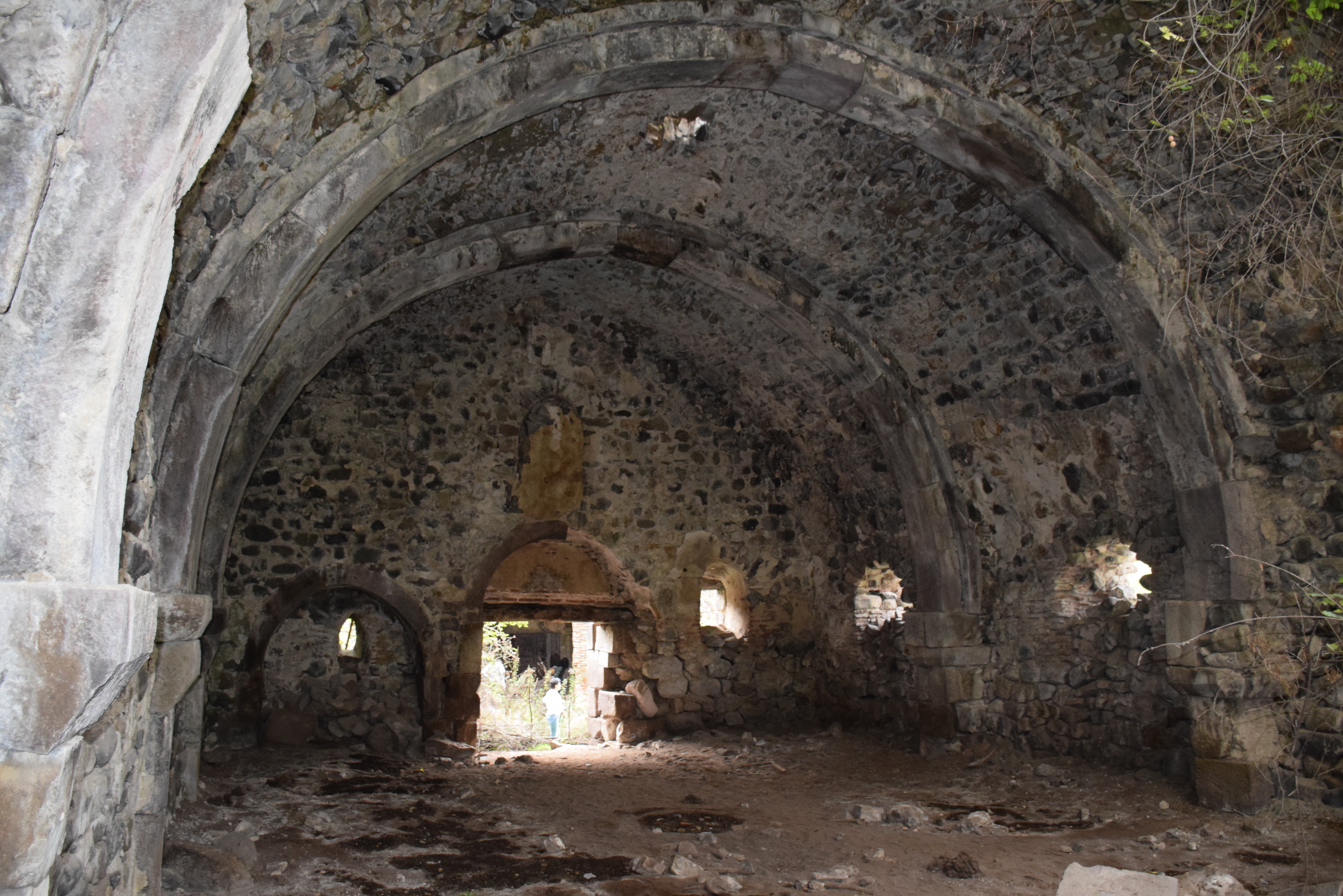

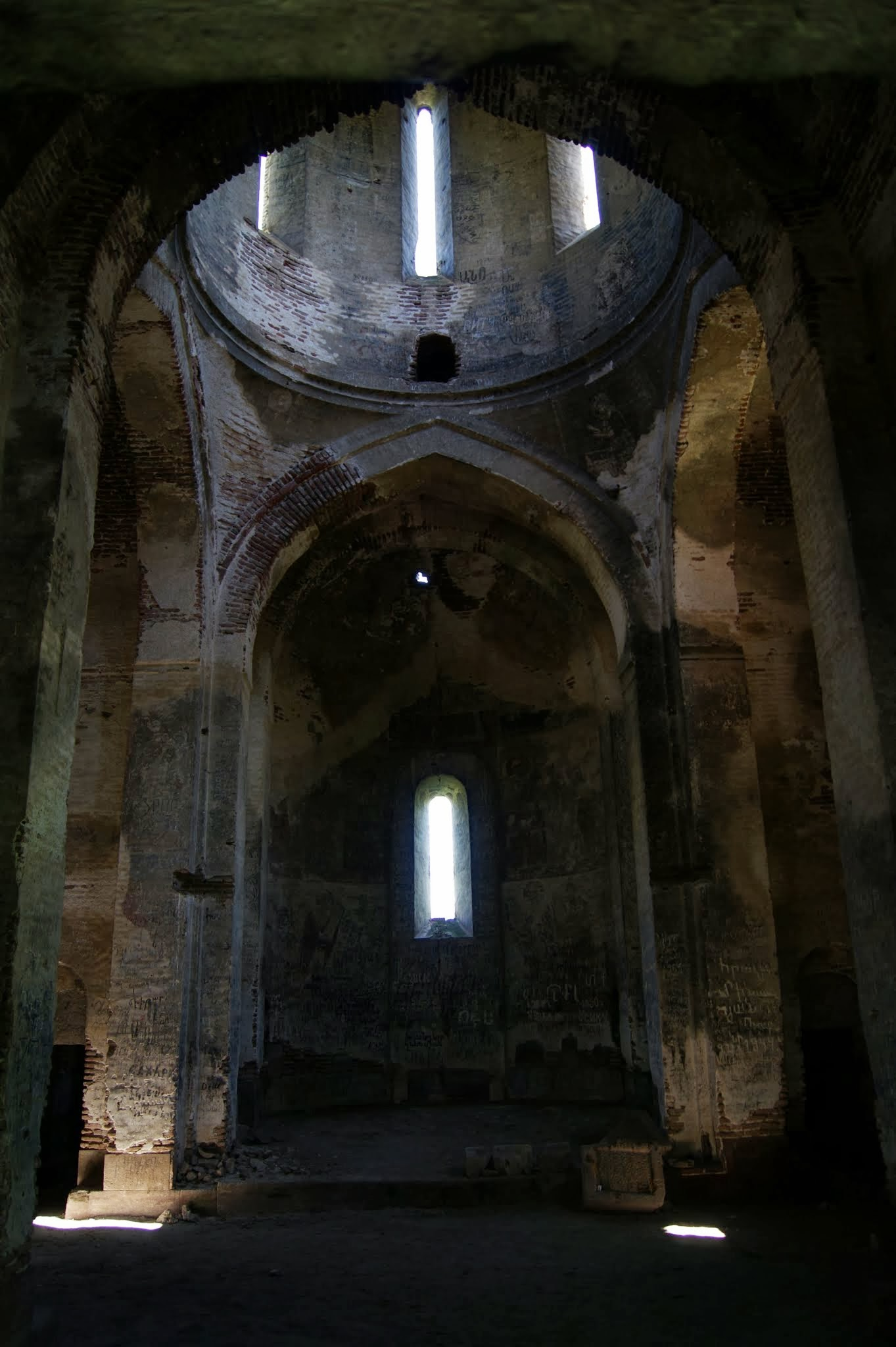
Interior of the church

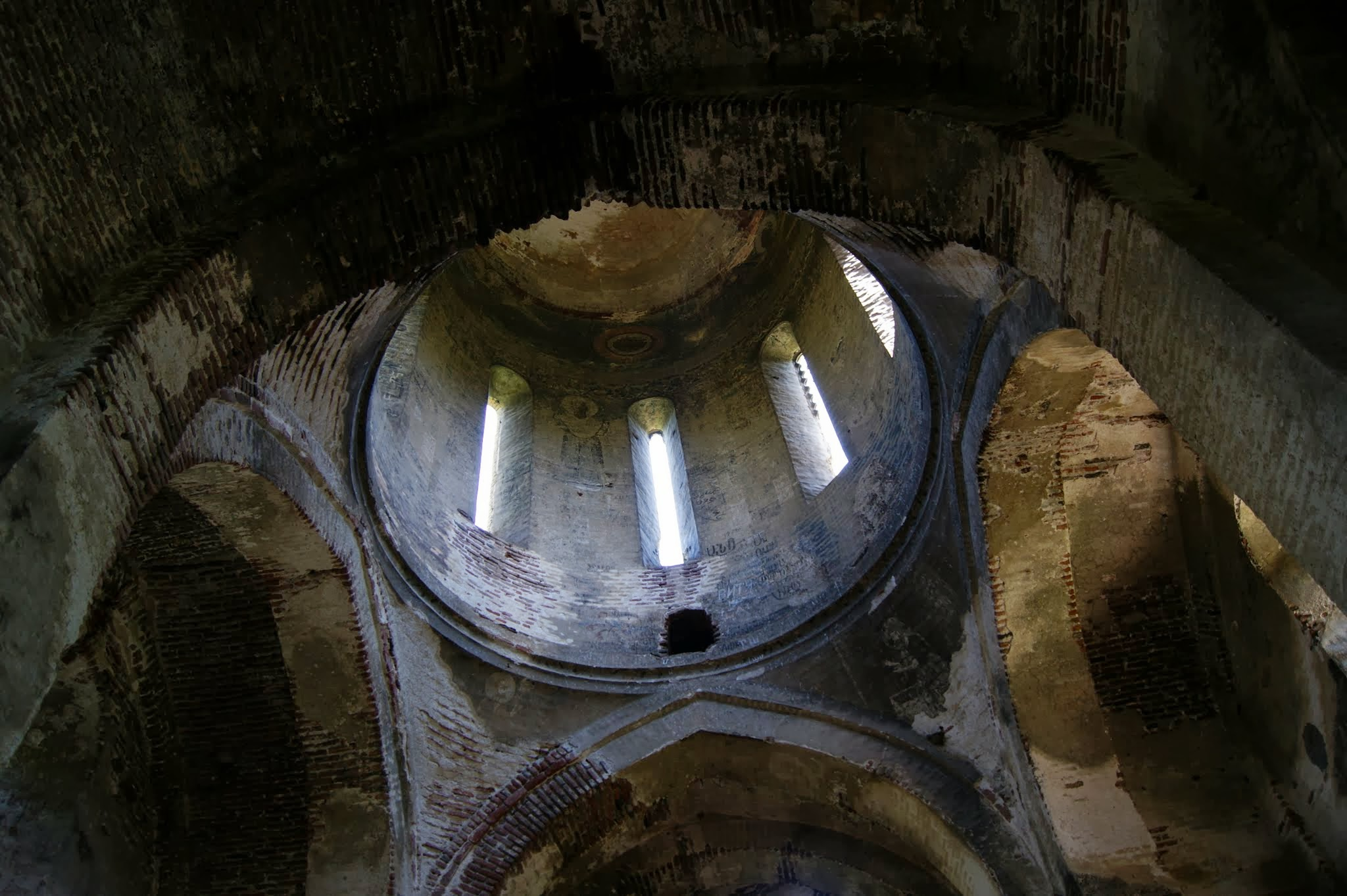
Interior of the drum and dome
