= Kirants, Armenia =

Kirants Կիրանց
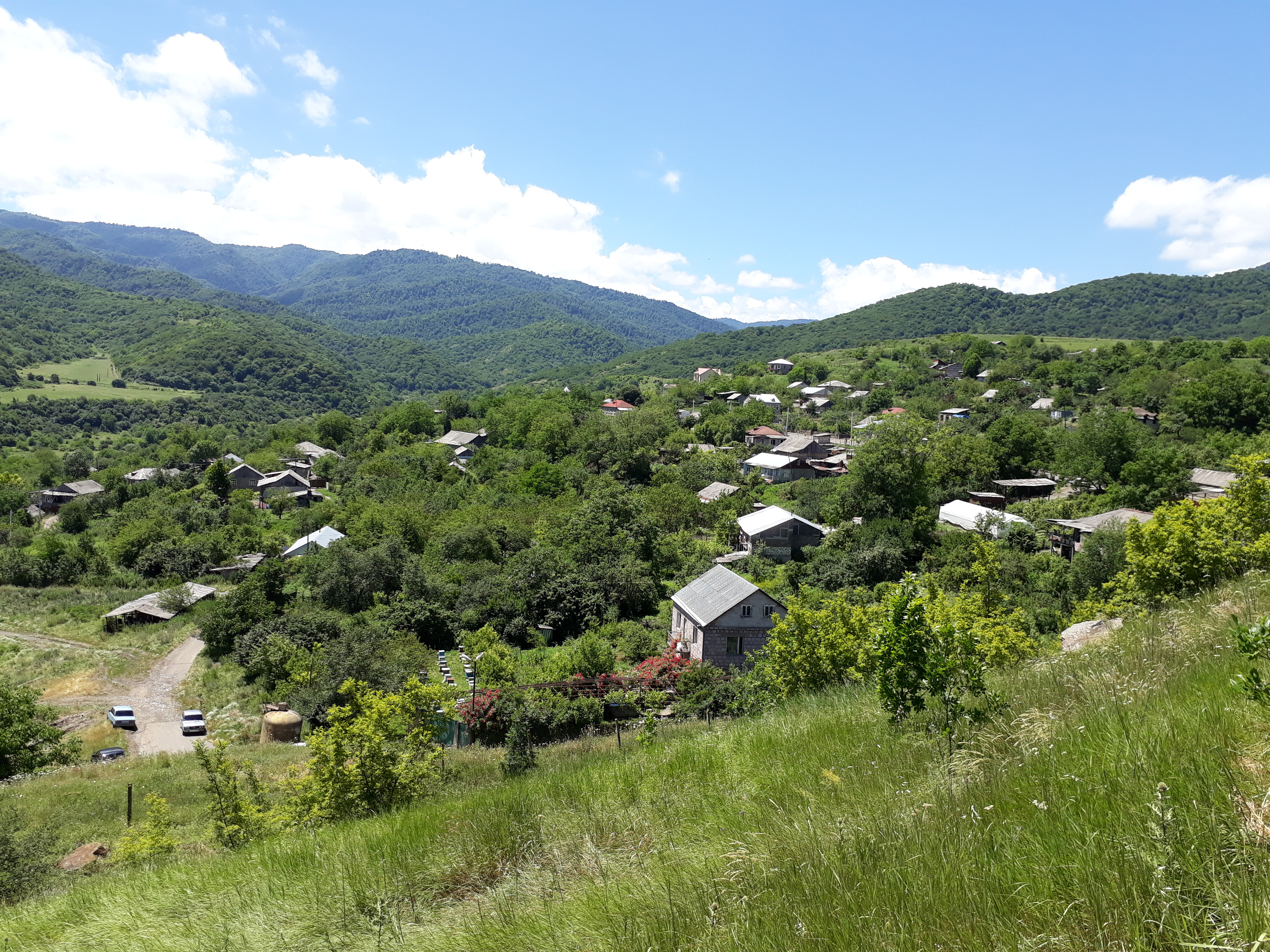
- A view of Kirants

- Location within Tavush Location within Armenia
- Coordinates: 41°02′49″N 45°05′52″E
- Country: Armenia
- Province: Tavush
- Municipality: Ijevan

Population (2011)
  - Total: 352
- Time zone: UTC+4 (AMT)

Kirants (Armenian: Կիրանց) is a village in the Ijevan Municipality of the Tavush Province of Armenia, near the border of Azerbaijan. The 8th-century Kirants Monastery, and the 13th-century Arakelots Monastery are located near Kirants.

== Toponymy ==
The village was known as Getashen until 1967.

== Gallery ==
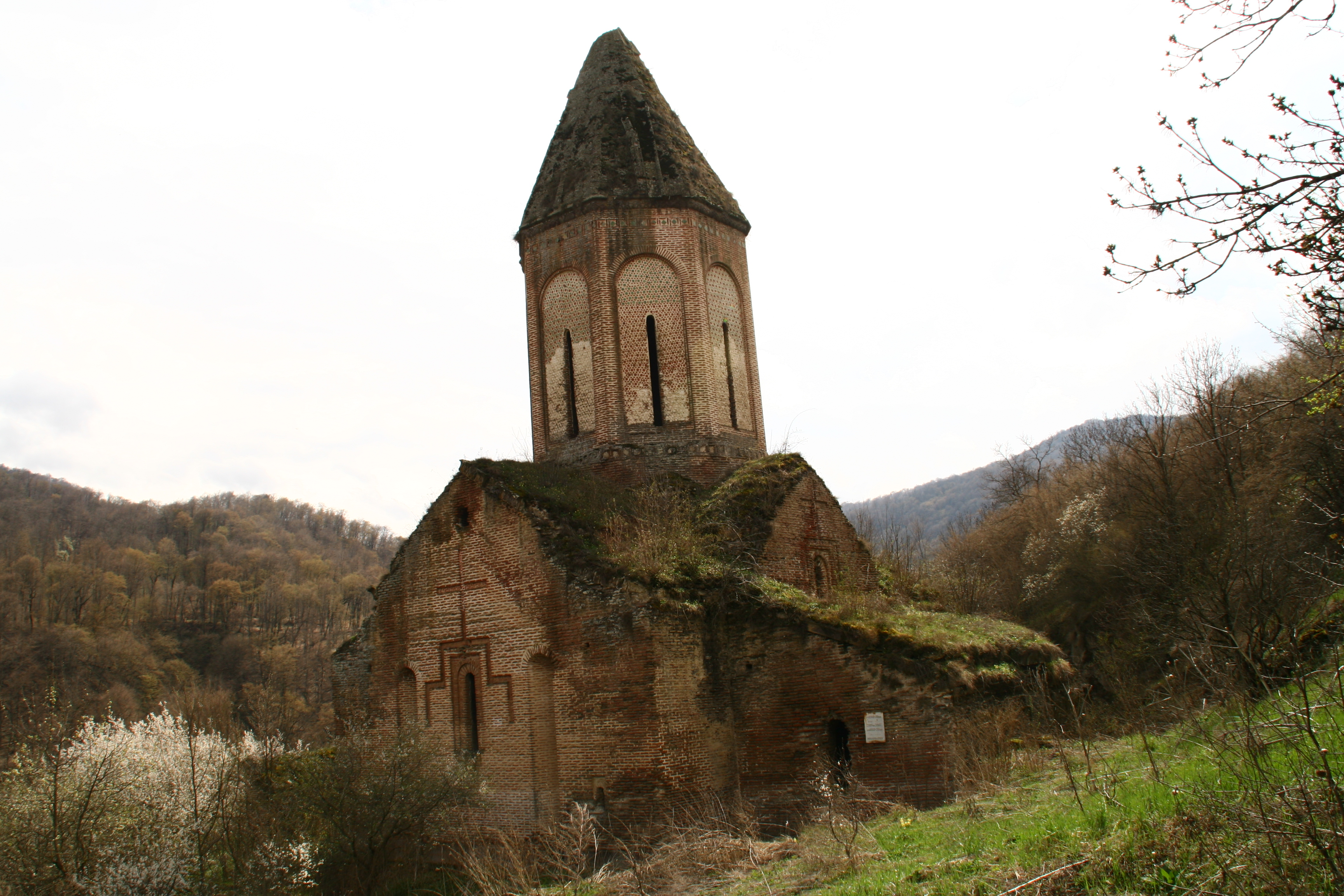
Kirants Monastery

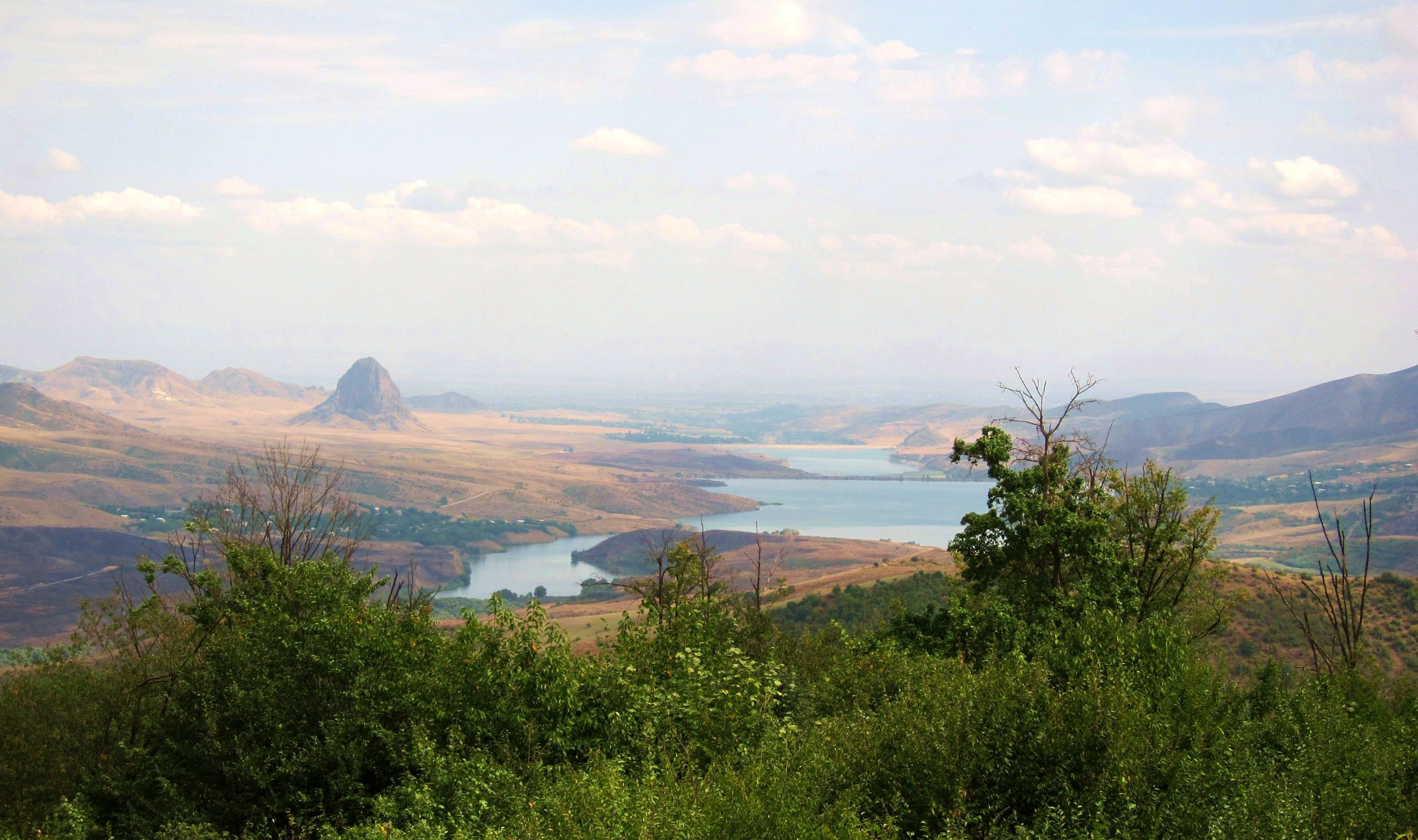
Scenery around Kirants

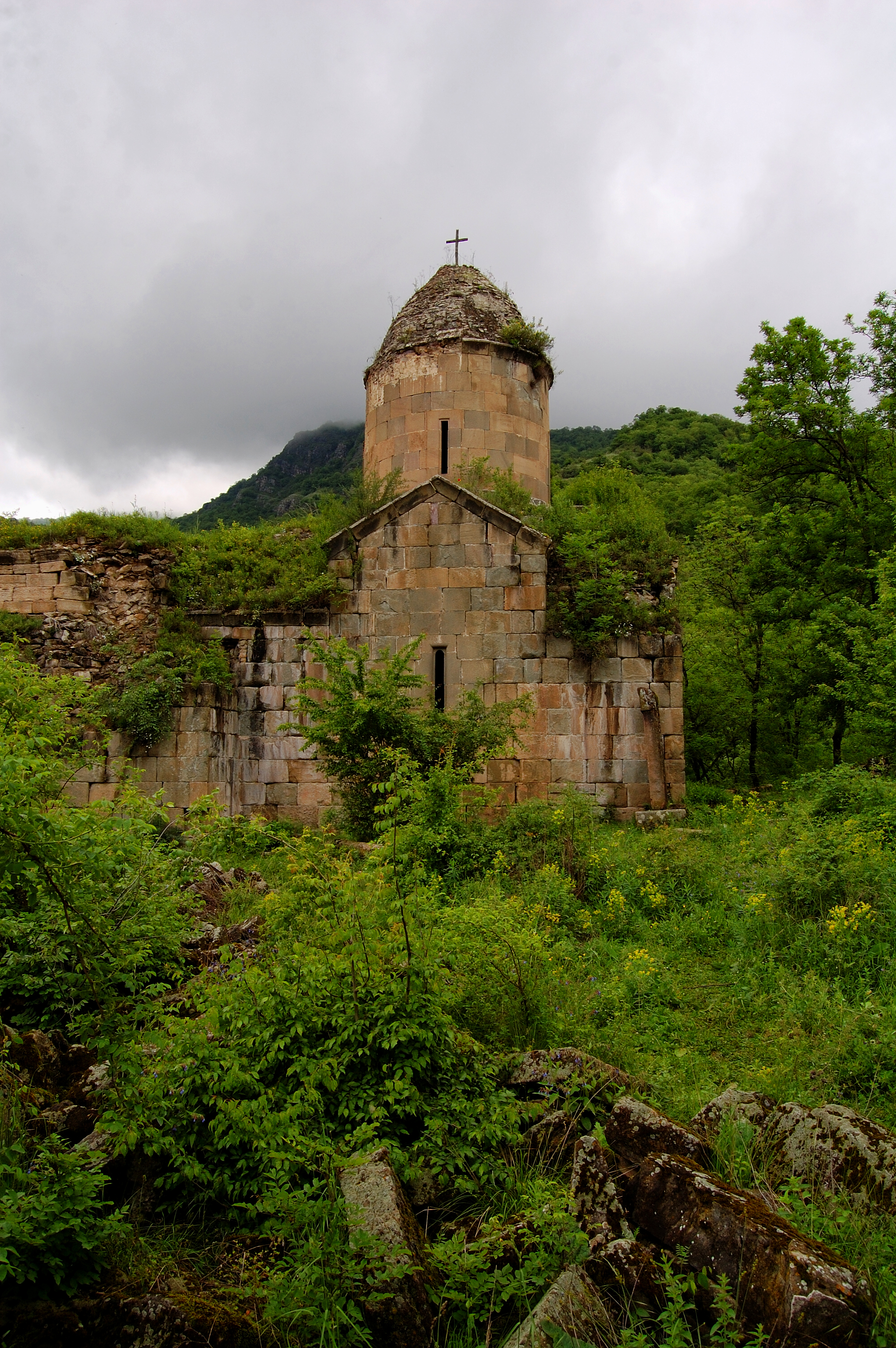
Arakelots Monastery

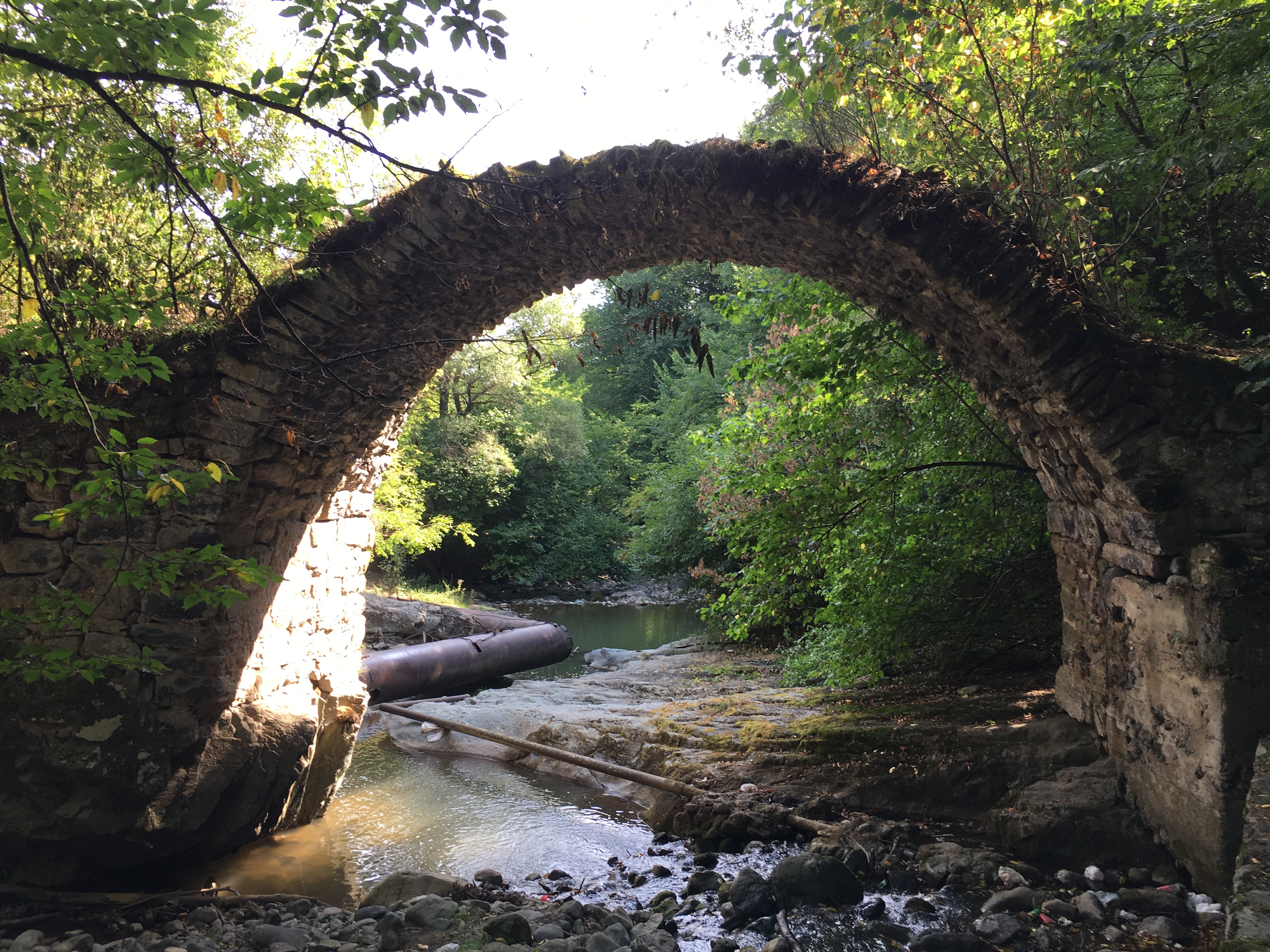
Sranotsi Bridge

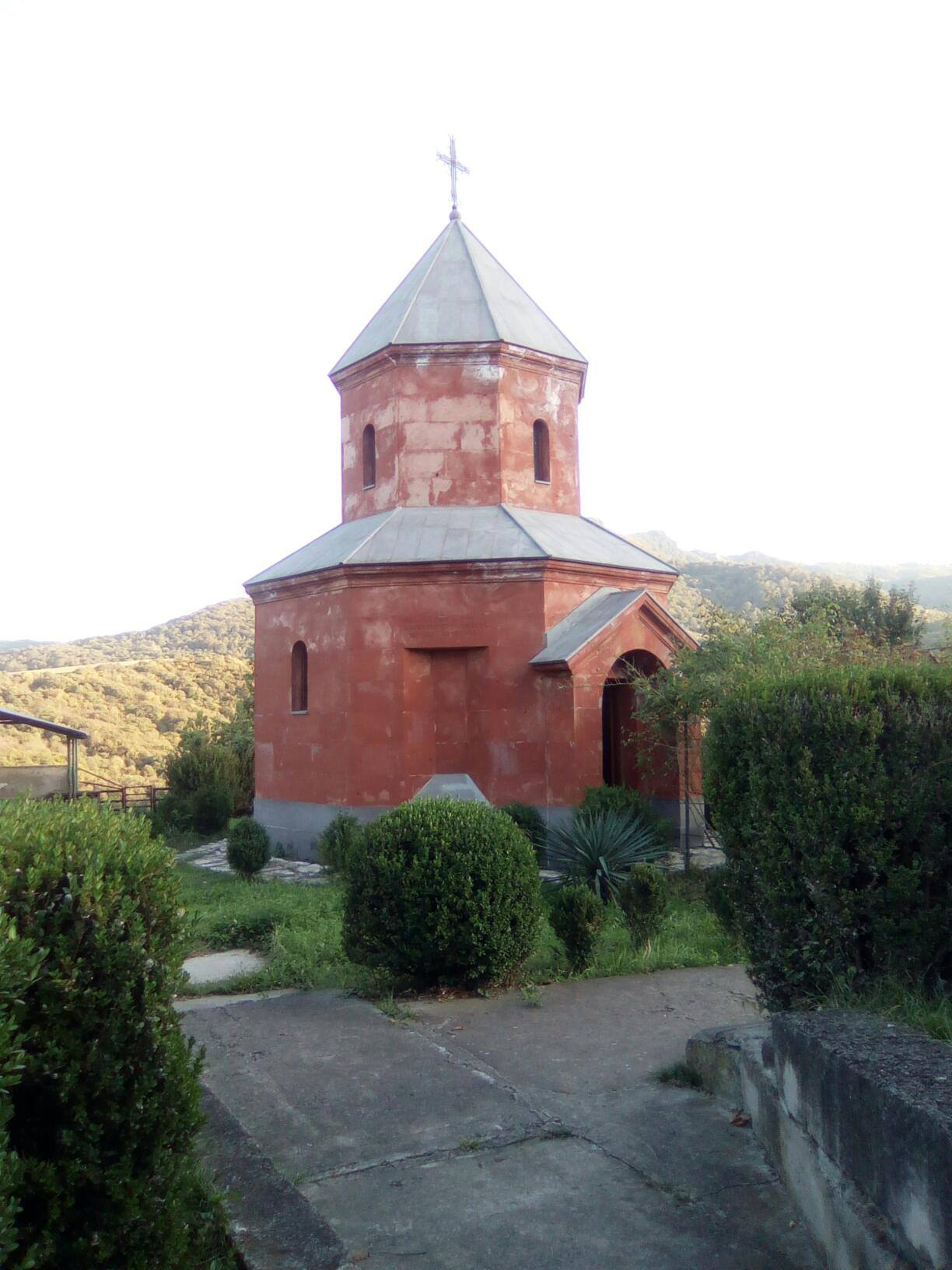
St. Astvatsatsin Church

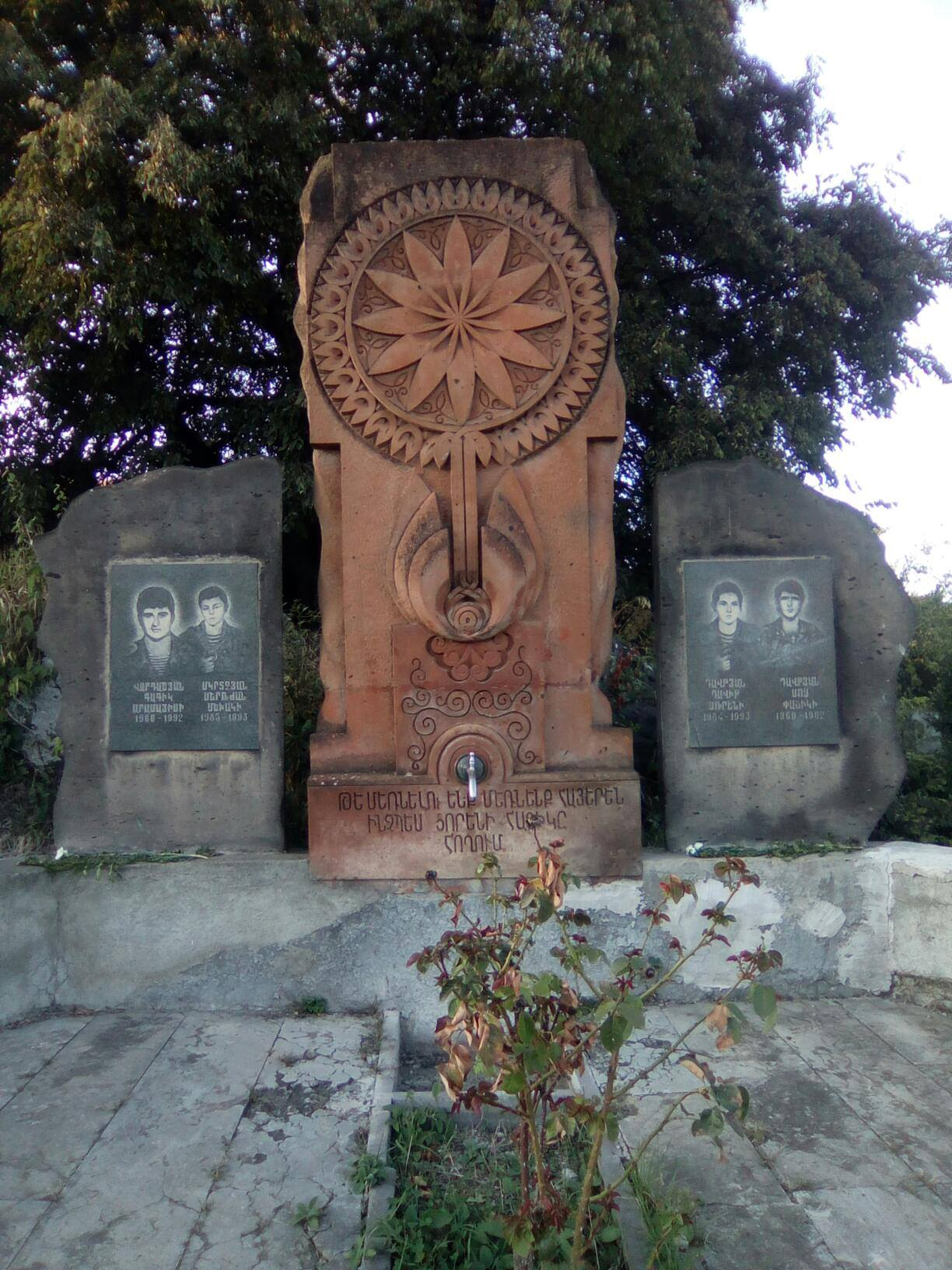
Artsakh war memorial

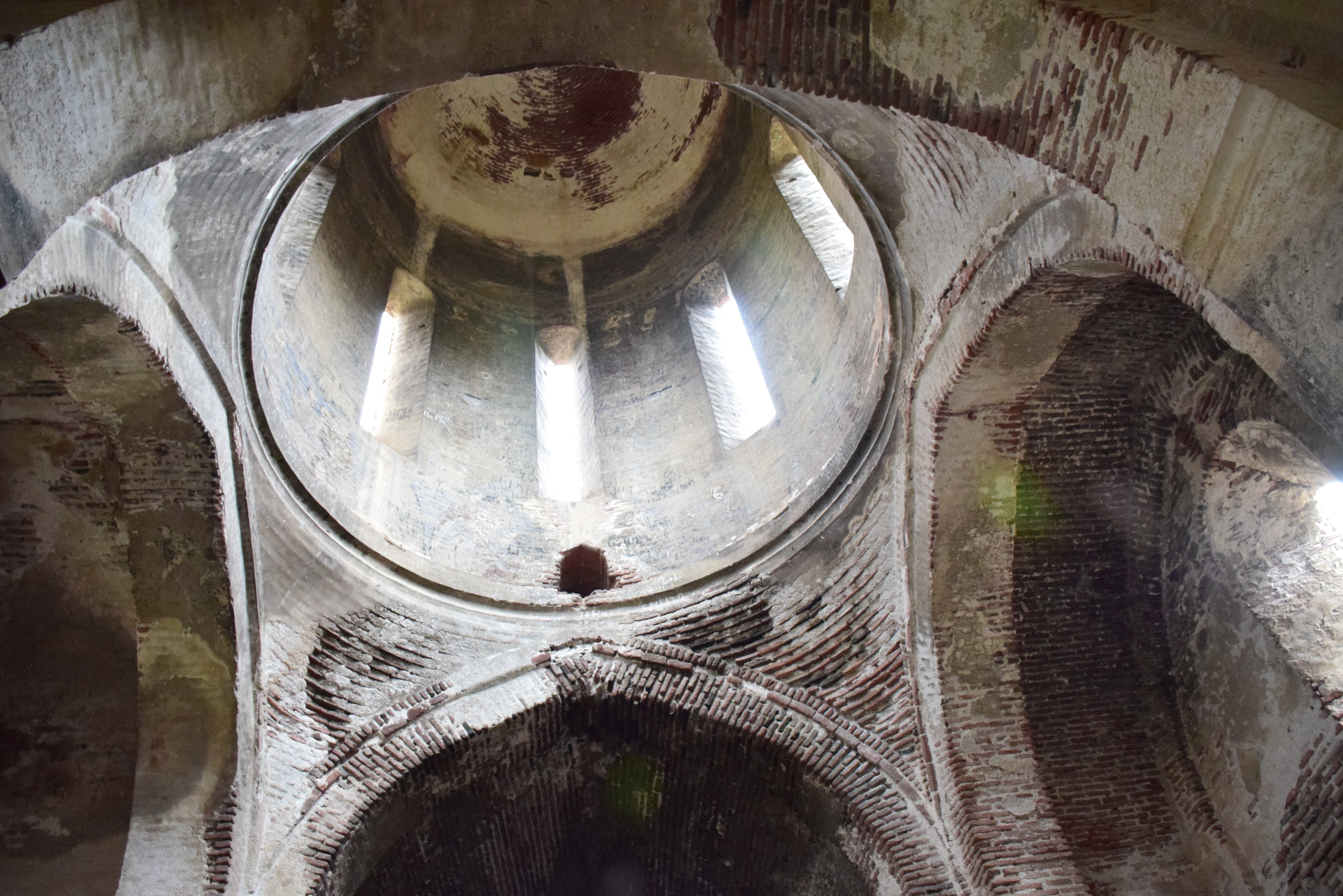
Kirants Monastery interior

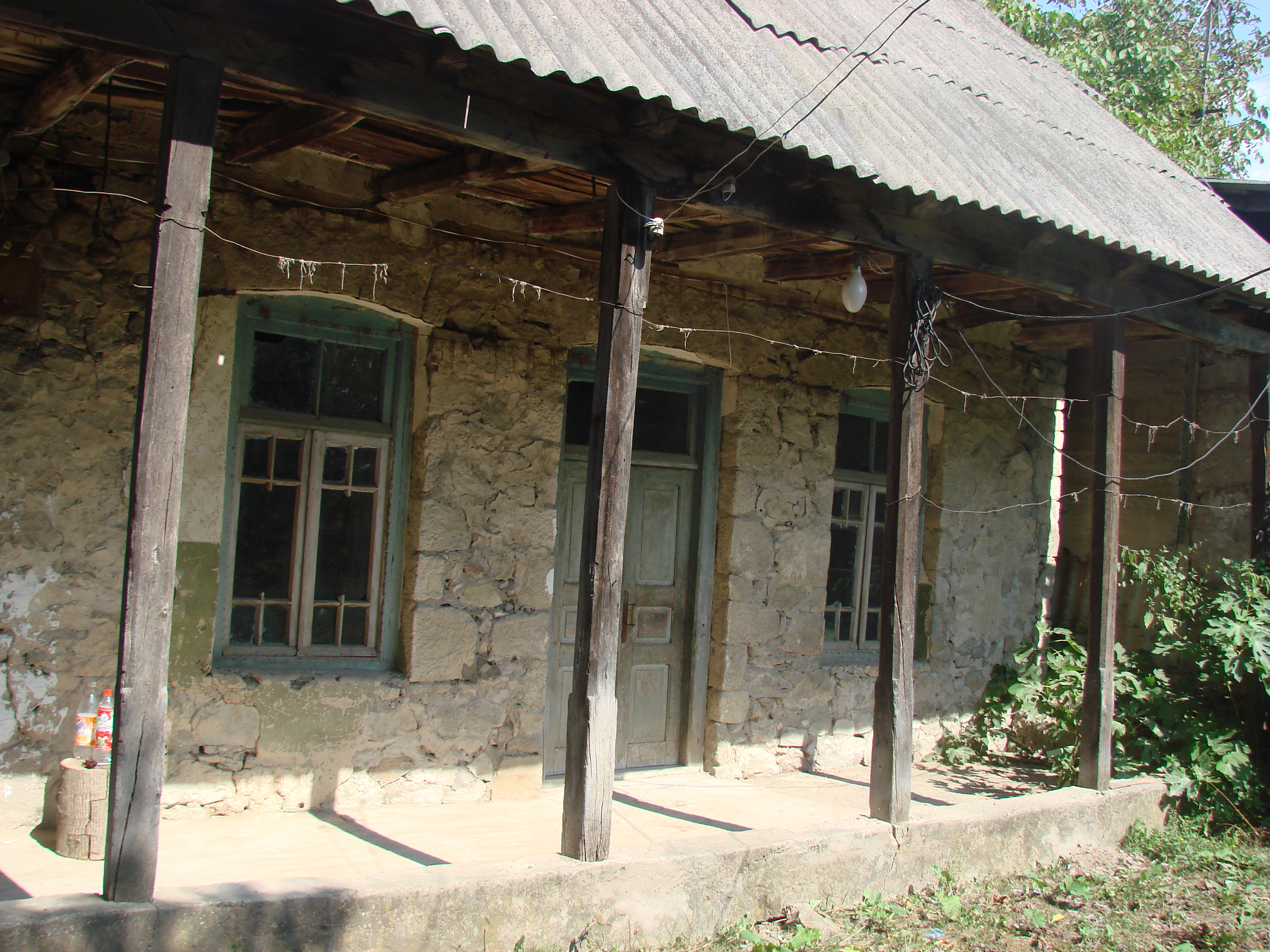
Old house in Kirants
