= Khndzorut, Lori =

Khndzorut
- Location within Armenia
- Coordinates: 40°47′N 44°32′E
- Country: Armenia
- Marz (Province): Lori
- Time zone: UTC+4 ( )
  - Summer (DST): UTC+5 ( )

Khndzorut (also, Vardanlu) is a town in the Lori Province of Armenia.
