= Oh, God! =

Oh God may refer to:

- An exclamation; similar to "oh no", "oh yes", "oh my", "aw goodness", "ah gosh", "ah gawd"; see interjection

== Oh, God! franchise ==
- Oh, God! film series
  - Oh, God! (1977 film) a.k.a. "Oh, God! 1"
  - Oh, God! Book II (1980 film) a.k.a. "Oh, God! 2"
  - Oh, God! You Devil (1984 film) a.k.a. "Oh, God! 3"

== Other uses ==
- O God, the Aftermath, a 2005 album by Norma Jean
- "Oh God" (song), on the 2013 album Winter Games by Chris Garneau
- Hey Ram (Oh God), a 2000 Indian film by Kamal Haasan

== See also ==
- God (disambiguation)
- My God (disambiguation)
- Oh My God (disambiguation)
- Oh My Goddess (disambiguation)
- Goddess (disambiguation)
- Oh No (disambiguation)
- Oh (disambiguation)
