= Microsoft hoax =

A Microsoft hoax may refer to:

- A technical support scam where a fraudulent caller impersonates Microsoft or Windows technical support
- The Microsoft acquisition hoax in which a bogus 1994 press release claims Microsoft has acquired the Roman Catholic Church
- jdbgmgr.exe virus hoax, an e-mail spam in 2002 involving a legitimate Microsoft Windows file
- SULFNBK.EXE, an internal component of the Microsoft Windows operating system that was subject of an email hoax in the early 2000s
- iLoo, a 2003 hoax claiming to be a cancelled Microsoft project
