= The Godz =

The Godz may refer to:

- The Godz (New York band), formed in 1966
- The Godz (Ohio band)
- The Godz (album), an album by The Godz from Ohio
- "The Godz...", a song by Brand Nubian from their 1993 album In God We Trust

== See also ==
- God (disambiguation)
- Gods (disambiguation)
