= Oh My Gods =

Oh My Gods might refer to:

- Oh My Gods!, a webcomic written and illustrated by Shivian Montar Balaris
- Oh. My. Gods., a 2008 young adult fantasy novel by Tera Lynn Childs

== See also ==
Oh My God (disambiguation)
