= List of Easter eggs in Microsoft products =

Some of Microsoft's early products included hidden Easter Eggs. Microsoft formally stopped including Easter Eggs in its programs as part of its Trustworthy Computing Initiative in 2002.

== Windows ==
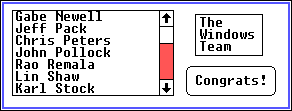
"The Windows Team" Easter egg in Windows 1.0

Microsoft Bear appearance in an Easter egg

Windows 95 credits Easter egg

Windows 98 credits Easter egg

Candy Cane texture in Windows XP

Windows 1.0, 2.0 and 2.1 all include an Easter egg, which features a window that shows a list of people who worked on the software along with a "Congrats!" button. Double clicking the list box further changes the background of the window to tiled smiley faces. The instructions for invoking the Easter egg vary depending on the version:

- 1.xx: Press Alt+⇧ Shift+Esc+↵ Enter.
- 1.01 and later: Hold Alt then Esc, release Alt then Esc, press Esc twice then press ← Backspace.
- 2.0 and later: Press F1, F5, F9, F4 and ← Backspace in rapid succession.

Windows 3.0 has a developer credits page which may be accessed by setting the focus to the desktop (by minimizing all windows and clicking on an open area of the desktop) then typing win30 followed by F3 and ← Backspace in quick succession. This causes the developer credits to appear on the desktop in the form of the email names of the crew.

Windows 3.1 has two visible Easter eggs, both of which reference the Microsoft Bear, which was the mascot of the Windows 3.1 development team. One was the developer credits, where the Bear, along with Bill Gates, Steve Ballmer, and Brad Silverberg, present the email aliases of the Windows 3.1 developers. bradsi, being in charge of Windows production, is listed first; the three other presenters, billg, steveb, and t-bear, appear together in "Special Thanks", the last section of the list. The other one was a reference to a fictitious file named BEAR.EXE in the properties window for the MS-DOS Prompt. Internally, there was another egg, where several internal system functions (although having meaningful internal names) were exported from user.exe as BEARNNN (where NNN is the ordinal number of the function) in his honor and to discourage their use by third-party software developers. The user can also find the easter egg by opening the About Program Manager, holding down Ctrl, Alt and ⇧ Shift, double click one colored square of the Microsoft Windows logo, and then close the window. Open it again and do so with a different square (with the keys still pressed down). Keep repeating this until the Microsoft Bear appears in the window, as seen to the right.

Windows 95 has an animated presentation of its developers, complete with music. This page is accessed by renaming a folder on the desktop to "and now, the moment you've all been waiting for", then "we proudly present for your viewing pleasure", and finally "The Microsoft Windows 95 Product Team!". Additionally, a dialog with credits can be invoked from the Windows Help application.

During the development of Windows 95, the shell developers had several stuffed animals as mascots. In addition to the Microsoft Bear, there were two bunnies as well - the smaller 16-bit Bunny and the larger 32-bit Bunny. The bunnies' names referred to the fact that Windows 95 was the transitional OS. The Microsoft Bunny has an exported function named after him, BUNNY_351 in krnl386.exe. Also, the Bunny is the icon for the Microsoft Party Line (rumor.exe) in some pre-release versions of Windows 95. In the internet mail app, there is a hidden credits list that can be accessed by clicking Help, About, comctl32.dll, and typing MORTIMER.

Windows 98 has a credits screen Easter egg, which can be triggered by invoking weldata.exe with the argument "You_are_a_real_rascal" in the command line or a shortcut (.lnk file), or by clicking and dragging between the locations of Memphis, Egypt; Memphis, Tennessee; and Redmond, Washington on the Time Zone map. (This easter egg is a reference to "Memphis" being the development codename of Windows 98.). Also credits are contained in registration wizard, holding down the Ctrl+⇧ Shift keys and right-click on the image to the left.

A drawing of the Microsoft Bear was used as the icon for the SETDEBUG.EXE and JDBGMGR.EXE system files. The odd icon gave credibility to the jdbgmgr.exe virus hoax, which claimed that the files were part of a computer virus. See SULFNBK.EXE for a similar hoax.

The Pipes screensaver in Windows 95 (OSR2 onwards), 98, ME, NT 4.0 and 2000 will occasionally insert a Utah teapot as a joint between pipes when the screensaver is configured to draw multiple, traditional-style pipes with mixed joint types and a solid texture. Windows 2000 and Windows XP have an undocumented texture in the Pipes screensaver (sspipes.scr) that makes the pipes red and white, similar to candy canes.

An Easter egg that displays the names of all the volcanoes in the United States can be found in the 3D Text screensaver on all versions of Microsoft Windows prior to Windows XP by setting the text to display to "Volcano". In Windows NT 3.5, setting the text to "I love NT" shows the names of the developers. "Rock" and "Beer" lists bands and breweries, respectively. In Windows NT 4.0, the phrase to view the developer credits was changed to "not evil". Setting the text to "I love NT" will instead simply display "good?".

Three images are embedded in the surface of Windows Vista's installation DVD. One of the images shows the faces of the members of Microsoft's anti-piracy team who worked on the hologram.

In Windows 10 build 16232, the "Windows is checking for a solution to solve the problem..." dialog that appears when a program crashes is replaced with "Windows is opening a portal to another dimension..."

== Microsoft Office ==
=== MS Access 1.0 ===
Access 1.0 had a simple animation showing a gun firing and killing two ducks. The story behind this is; one of the team members spoke with a strong accent and when referring to the main competition 'Paradox' it sounded like "Pair o' Ducks". The gun killing the ducks is something like what the earlier release date and ridiculously cheap pricing, did to Paradox. In truth the product was not truly ready for market at the time of the release of 1.0 and it was almost immediately followed up with a free copy of 1.1 for those that could produce evidence of their purchase of 1.0, but the damage had been done to Paradox. Paradox did eventually come to market, and probably with a better product, but by that time, people looking for an all encompassing, low level application and database development platform, were already using Microsoft Access.

=== Word for Windows 2 ===
In Word for Windows 2, there is a simple animation involving a WordPerfect 'Monster', a fireworks display and credits roll in the About box. The user's name (entered in Tools Options) was appended to the end of the "Thanks" section of the credits.

=== Office 4.3 ===
The tip of the day would sometimes display the following platitudes. They could also be viewed in the help file. This first appeared in Office 4.3, and also appeared in Office 95, and 97.

- If you do your best, whatever happens will be for the best.
- Things that go away by themselves can come back by themselves.
- Plaid shirts and striped pants rarely make a positive fashion statement.
- You should never dive into murky waters.
- It's never too late to learn to play the piano.
- You can hurt yourself if you run with scissors.
- You should never look directly at the sun.
- This is the last tip.

=== Office 95 ===
- Microsoft Excel contained a hidden Doom-like mini-game called "The Hall of Tortured Souls", a series of rooms featuring the names and faces of the developers. The mini-game generated some controversy when chain emails made spurious claims and conspiracy theories accusing Microsoft—particularly Bill Gates—of hiding Satanic symbolism within its software.

=== Office 97 ===
The Word 97 Pinball

- Microsoft Excel contained a hidden flight simulator.
- Microsoft Word contained a hidden pinball game. It also contained a hidden developer credits screen. The latter easter egg went undiscovered for 29 years.
- Microsoft Access contained a hidden simulation of the Magic 8 Ball toy. This also works in Access 2000.
- Access contained a hidden Access 97 developer credits
- Microsoft PowerPoint contained a hidden developer credits

=== Office 2000 ===
- Microsoft Excel and the Office Web Components contained a hidden 3D game called "Dev Hunter" (inspired by Spy Hunter). DirectX must be installed for this to work, and the egg is incompatible with certain service pack upgrades.
- Microsoft PowerPoint contained a hidden 3D developer credits
- Microsoft Word contained a hidden cast of developers

=== Office 2004 Mac ===
The game Asteroids is included in the Microsoft Office Notifications application.

== Cortana ==
These features below were discontinued because Cortana is no longer available.

- When asked if she likes Clippy, Cortana would answer "Definitely! He taught me how important it is to listen." or "What's not to like? That guy took a heck of a beating and he's still smiling." Her avatar then occasionally turns into a two-dimensional Metro-style Clippit for several seconds Similarly, asking "Do you know Clippy?" or "Where is Clippy?", will give a response as well.
- Asking Cortana "What does the fox say?" would make her respond with "Ring-ding-ding-ding-dingeringeding", a reference to the 2013 song The Fox
- Cortana had several Easter Eggs referencing the Halo franchise including, but not limited to, the questions, "What is Halo?", "Tell me about Halo", "Do you love Master Chief?" and "How is Master Chief?"
- Saying, "May the force be with you" to Cortana would make her reply "My ally is the force, and a powerful ally it is", a reference to the Star Wars franchise.
- Asking, "What is the airspeed velocity of an unladen swallow?" would make Cortana respond "What do you mean? An African or European swallow?", a reference to Monty Python.
- Saying, "Up up down down left right left right B A start" to Cortana would make her say, "That it is the Konami Code, not the Cortana Code."
- Asking Cortana, "Who lives in a pineapple under the sea?", would make her respond with "SpongeBob SquarePants!", a reference to the theme song of the 1999 animated series SpongeBob SquarePants.
- Asking Cortana to do a barrel roll would cause her to respond with "How about a sausage roll?", "How about a swiss roll?", or "How about a spicy tuna roll?".

== Gaming ==
- In one of the missions of Microsoft Flight Simulator X, called "Secret Shuttle", the player's call sign is changed mid-flight to a one that starts with "Longhorn". After landing at Area 51, a request from another aircraft for departure clearance, whose call sign starts with "Vista" can be heard over the radio. "Longhorn" was the development codename for the then-upcoming Windows Vista operating system, which was released worldwide in 2007. The game was released in 2006.
- The Xbox console contains developer credits in the dashboard. Inserting an audio CD and ripping it with the name "<<Eggsßox>>" would trigger it.
- The Xbox has another series of hidden credits, which can be accessed by naming an album "Timmyyyyyyyyyyyyyyyyyyyyyyyyyy!".
- The Xbox games console contains hidden, modified sounds of the Apollo space missions of which are conversations that are currently in the public domain. The sounds would only play when the console is idle on the Xbox dashboard for a long period of time.
- A super deformed cartoon depiction of Halo protagonist Master Chief can be seen inside the Xbox One S's plastic casing and on the Xbox One X's motherboard.

== Others ==
- Typing WAIT6502,1 into a Commodore PET with BASIC V2 (1979) would result in "MICROSOFT!" printed on the top left of the screen, partly overwriting the first line "### COMMODORE BASIC ###".
- In Microsoft QBasic, there is an Easter Egg where the developers credits can be seen at start up, printed in colorful text, flying in one letter at a time from every corner.
- Acid1 is included as an offline Easter Egg, accessible by typing 'about:tasman', in Internet Explorer 5 for Mac OS with the text replaced by the names of the developers.
- Typing edge://surf into the address bar in Microsoft Edge versions higher than 83 will allow users to play Surf, a game where the player controls a surfer who must collect powerups and run from a Kraken. This game bears resemblance to SkiFree, another Microsoft-developed game, and has been compared to Google Chrome's Dinosaur Game. The game contains some easter eggs of its own, such as a SkiFree cameo during the "Time Trial" mode and a hidden costume if the Konami Code is entered on the surfer select screen.
- In Microsoft Teams 1.5.00.21668 (32 bit), typing (Windows) will cause a green dinosaur to appear.
- In Windows 95, 98, 2000, and XP, holding Ctrl-Shift-F10 in a game of FreeCell will cause a pop-up "User-Friendly User Interface" to pop-up. Clicking Abort then clicking a card will make the game win itself.

== Features often mistaken for Easter eggs ==
The following are not Easter Eggs, but rather features unexpected by many users of Microsoft products.

=== Microsoft Word ===
Every version of Microsoft Word from 97 to 2016 (Windows) or 2004 to 2011 (Mac) contain functions to create filler text. On older versions, typing =rand() in a Word document and hitting "Enter" results in 3 paragraphs of 5 repetitions of the pangram "The quick brown fox jumps over the lazy dog". Typing =rand(X,Y) (with numbers for X and Y) results in X paragraphs of Y repetitions of the sentence. For example, =rand(10,10) will produce ten paragraphs, each with ten repetitions. Microsoft has officially described this as a feature and not an Easter Egg. In Microsoft Word 2007 and 2010, the repeated sentence is replaced with a longer text:

On the Insert tab, the galleries include items that are designed to coordinate with the overall look of your document. You can use these galleries to insert tables, headers, footers, lists, cover pages, and other document building blocks. When you create pictures, charts, or diagrams, they also coordinate with your current document look.

You can easily change the formatting of selected text in the document text by choosing a look for the selected text from the Quick Styles gallery on the Home tab. You can also format text directly by using the other controls on the Home tab. Most controls offer a choice of using the look from the current theme or using a format that you specify directly.

To change the overall look of your document, choose new Theme elements on the Page Layout tab. To change the looks available in the Quick Style gallery, use the Change Current Quick Style Set command. Both the Themes gallery and the Quick Styles gallery provide reset commands so that you can always restore the look of your document to the original contained in your current template.

In Microsoft Word 2013, the text was replaced again with

Video provides a powerful way to help you prove your point. When you click on Online Video, you can paste in the embed code for the video you want to add. You can also type a keyword to search online for the video that best fits your document.

To make your document look professionally produced, Word provides header, footer, cover page, and text box designs that complement each other. For example, you can add a matching cover page, header, and sidebar. Click the Insert tab and then choose the elements you want from the different galleries.

Themes and styles also help keep your document coordinated. When you click on Design and choose a new Theme, the pictures, charts, and SmartArt graphics change to match your new theme. When you apply styles, your headings change to match the new theme.

Save time in Word with new buttons that show up where you need them. To change the way a picture fits in your document, click it and a button for layout options appears next to it. When you work on a table, click where you want to add a row or a column, and then click the plus sign tab.

Reading is easier, too, in the new Reading view. You can collapse parts of the document and focus on the text you want. If you need to stop reading before you reach the end, Word remembers where you left off - even on another device.

When =rand(1,1) is written, only a simple sentence is shown: in English, it is "On the Insert tab, the galleries include items that are designed to coordinate with the overall look of your document."

In Word 2007, 2010, 2013, 2016, 2019 and online, the pangram "The quick brown fox jumps over the lazy dog" text is available by typing the command =rand.old() and pressing enter.

Additionally, typing =lorem() gives the following text:

Lorem ipsum dolor sit amet, consectetur adipiscing elit. Maecenas porttitor congue massa. Fusce posuere, magna sed pulvinar ultricies, purus lectus malesuada libero, sit amet commodo magna eros quis urna. Nunc viverra imperdiet enim. Fusce est. Vivamus a tellus. Pellentesque habitant morbi tristique senectus et netus et malesuada fames ac turpis egestas. Proin pharetra nonummy pede. Mauris et orci.

Typing =lorem(N) will produce "N" (where N is an integer) lines of lorem ipsum text. When "N" is larger than 27, the function begins to repeat itself.

All of these features will be disabled when "Replace text as you type" is turned off.

Microsoft Word insert pictures icon: light vs. dark mode

In Microsoft Word 2021, when dark mode is enabled, the picture icon in the insert tab replaces the sun with a moon.

=== Microsoft Windows ===
- In Microsoft Windows, it is not possible to create or rename a file or folder called CON (case insensitive). This has been subject to a hoax that claims Microsoft is unable to explain why. In reality, CON along with PRN, AUX, COM# (where # is a digit), LPT# (where # is a digit), and NUL, are reserved device names.
- There were features that needed to be turned on while Windows 95 was beta tested. Some of the desktop features, including full window drag and anti-aliased fonts, could be turned on by placing the line ILOVEBUNNY32=1 under the Windows section in win.ini. The features were later sold in the Microsoft Plus! for Windows 95 add-on.
- DeskBar was a feature Microsoft planned to introduce in Windows 98. This would allow users to download desktop toolbars (deskbars) from their favorite websites. These mini-toolbars could update themselves automatically at predefined times, supplying the latest information from the websites without the need to launch a web browser. Microsoft did implement this feature in Windows 98 beta builds, but webmasters showed little interest and the feature was subsequently hidden in the Windows 98 RTM version.
- Windows includes a number of MIDI files for troubleshooting purposes. In Windows 3.1, PASSPORT.MID and CANYON.MID (by George Stone) can be found in the directory <drive>:\Windows\Media, with some .WAV and .RMI files. Windows 95 contains CLOUDS.MID (by Brian Orr), which plays in a hidden credits sequence. In Windows ME and later versions, these were replaced by ONESTOP.MID (composed by David Yackley), FLOURISH.MID, and TOWN.MID (both by Nathan Grigg). These files allows for product support technicians to diagnose problems with MIDI playback without requiring the user to go to a Web page and download a known-good MIDI file. FLOURISH.MID was also used by DirectX Diagnostic Tool 9.0 (included in dxdiagn.dll and replaced DXDIAG.MID, which was included in DirectX 6 to DirectX 8 and included in dxdiag.exe) to test DirectMusic. CSSAMP1.MID can also appear if Canon drivers are installed.
- In Windows 98, a music file titled welcom98.wav is found in \WINDOWS\Application Data\Microsoft\Welcome folder.
- In Windows Me, a video file titled winme.wmv is found in \WINDOWS\Options\Install folder.
- In Windows XP, a music file titled title.wma is found in \WINDOWS\system32\oobe\images folder. (OOBE stands for Out-of-box experience.) It is titled "Windows Welcome music" in the file's metadata, and was composed by Stan LePard. This is the background music played during the initial configuration wizard used to perform tasks such as setting up user accounts the first time that a new installation of Windows XP is used. In Windows Server 2003, and some builds of Longhorn, title.wma is instead replaced by the song "No Hay Problema", produced by Oregon-based band Pink Martini. It was previously used in Internet Explorer Starter Kit 3.0 and a remix in Encarta Virtual Globe 1998 Edition. However, x64 builds of Windows Server 2003 and Windows XP Professional x64 Edition do not include title.wma.
- Since Windows 95, a utility called "Phone Dialer" is available that allows one to place a call through one's phone port, provided they have one on their computer. There are no Start menu shortcuts for it and one must run its executable file (dialer.exe) directly. This was only documented in Windows 95 and Windows 98.
- In the early versions of the Minesweeper game, if the user starts the game, types "xyzzy", and presses Right Shift+↵ Enter simultaneously, the top left-most pixel of the monitor (not the window) will be white or black when the mouse is hovered above a square, indicating that the square is either safe or mined, respectively. The first click anywhere in Minesweeper is never a mine. A click on a 'black' square, as first click, moves that mine away.
- In 3D Pinball, typing in "hidden test" on keyboard, allows the player to move the ball freely.
- Starting with Windows Vista, the Windows Master Control Panel shortcut, colloquially known as "God Mode", is commonly mistaken for an Easter Egg. Creating a folder that references a specific global unique identifier allows for the creation of a shortcut to a location; in the case of "God Mode" (GodMode.{ED7BA470-8E54-465E-825C-99712043E01C}) it creates a Control Panel applet with all control panel items view (more than 200) enabled.
- Starting with Windows 8.1, there's a file called "slidetoshutdown.exe" in the system32 folder. When it runs, a bar appears at the top of the screen. Dragging it down with the mouse shuts down the computer. This feature was originally designed for touchscreen devices to allow users to shut down the system with a gesture rather than using buttons, but it remains in desktop versions of Windows.

== See also ==
- List of Google Easter eggs
