= Antichrist (disambiguation) =

The Antichrist is a Christian concept based on the exegesis of Second Temple (500 BC–50 AD) Jewish texts that refer to anti-messiahs (see List of fictional Antichrists).

Antichrist or Antikrist may also refer to:

== Books ==
- The Antichrist (book), by Friedrich Nietzsche

== Film ==
- Antichrist (film), a 2009 film by Lars von Trier
- The Antichrist (film), a 1974 film by Alberto De Martino

== Music ==
- Antikrist, an opera by Rued Langgaard
- Antichrist (Das Ich album)
- Antichrist (Gorgoroth album), by the black metal band Gorgoroth
- Antichrist (Akercocke album), by the extreme metal band Akercocke
- Antichrist Superstar, an album by Marilyn Manson
- The Antichrist (album), by the thrash metal band Destruction
- "Antichrist" (song), by Eminem
- "The Antichrist", a song by the band Slayer on their debut album, Show No Mercy
- The Antichrist (also, "Son of Maraka"), the name for a difficult vehicle that features prominently in The Gods Must Be Crazy
- "Antichrist", a song by the 1975 on their debut album, The 1975
- "Antichrist", a song by Holly Humberstone on Paint My Bedroom Black
- "Antichrist", a song by Sepultura on their debut EP, Bestial Devastation

== Other ==
- Antichrist (virus hoax), Spanish computer virus hoax

== See also ==
- Anti-Christian sentiment, encompasses discrimination and intolerance against Christians
- Dajjal, the Islamic concept of the Antichrist

== Distinguish from ==
- Antikristos, a Greek, Armenian and Assyrian folk dance
