= GUD =

GUD or Gud may refer to:

== Arts and entertainment ==
- GUD (band), an Australian trio
- Gud (music producer) (born 1995), Swedish DJ, producer and rapper
- GUD Magazine, an American literary periodical

== Medicine ==
- Genital ulcer disease
- Wilms tumor protein (AEWS-GUD)

== Other uses ==
- Yocoboué Dida language, spoken in Ivory Coast (ISO 639-3: gud)
- Groupe Union Défense, a French far-right political group
- Guadeloupe, an overseas territory of France in the Caribbean (UNDP code: GUD)
- Jaggery, a traditional form of sugar cane

== See also ==
- God (disambiguation)
- Good (disambiguation)
