= God (disambiguation) =

A god is a male deity.

God is the supreme deity in theistic beliefs.

God or gods may also refer to:

- God (word), the English word

== Places ==
- Göd, a town in Pest County, Hungary
- God, a WWI British troop nickname for Godewaersvelde, France
- Godalming railway station, England, station code GOD

== People ==
=== Given name ===
- God Nisanov (born 1972), Russian property developer
- God Shammgod (born 1976), American basketball player and coach

=== Nickname ===
- Eric Clapton (born 1945), English musician
- Gus O'Donnell (born 1952), former UK civil service head
- Gary Ablett Sr. (born 1961), Australian-rules football player
- Robbie Fowler (born 1975), English former footballer
- Justin de Nobrega (active beginning 2008), formerly known as "God", producer of the hip hop duo Die Antwoord

== Arts, entertainment, and media ==
=== Fictional entities ===
- God, a fictional music album by The Beatles in Stephen Baxter's "The Twelfth Album"
- GOD, short for Government of Darkness, a fictional criminal empire in the Japanese Kamen Rider X TV series

=== Gaming ===
- God, a senior administrator in MUD terminology
- GoD, short for Gates of Discord, an EverQuest game expansion
- Gods (video game), a 1991 video game

=== Music ===
==== Groups and labels ====
- God (Australian band), an Australian indie rock band
- God (British band), a London-based industrial band
- g.o.d (South Korean band), a South Korean boy band
- The Gods (band), a rock band from England

==== Albums ====
- God (Rebecca St. James album), 1996
- God (Rip Rig + Panic album), 1981
- G.O.D. (Gold, Oil & Diamonds), a 2009 mixtape by AZ
- God, a 2016 album by Inhuman
- G.O.D., a 2020 extended play by Virgen María

==== Songs ====
- "God" (John Lennon song), 1970
- "God" (Kendrick Lamar song), 2017
- "God" (Tori Amos song), 1994
- "God" (Rebecca St. James song), 1996
- "God", by I Prevail, on the 2025 album Violent Nature
- "God", by Matt Proxy, on the 2026 album Trojan Horse
- "God", by Outkast, on the 2003 album Speakerboxxx/The Love Below
- "God", by Prince, B-side of single "Purple Rain"
- "God", by Relient K, on the 2016 album Air for Free
- "God", by Smashing Pumpkins, B-side of single "Zero"
- "God", by Weird Owl, on the 2015 album Interstellar Skeletal
- "Gods", a 2023 song by NewJeans from the theme song of the 2023 League of Legends World Championship

=== Theatre ===
- God (play), 1975, by Woody Allen
- The gods (theatrical), the upper levels of a theatre

=== Other uses in arts, entertainment, and media ===
- Gods (film), 2014 Polish film directed by Łukasz Palkowski
- God (sculpture), a 1917 readymade artwork by Elsa von Freytag-Loringhoven
- GOD TV, an international Christian broadcaster
- G.O.D (web series), a 2019 Indian Telugu-language web series
- The Gods (TV series), a 2018 Chinese series

== Brands and enterprises ==
- Gathering of Developers, a defunct video game publisher
- Goods of Desire, Hong Kong company

== Other uses ==
- Guerrillas of Destiny, professional wrestling tag team (sometimes shortened to G.O.D.)
- Horned God, a figure in Wicca and other forms of modern paganism
- Internet outdial, a shorten acronym, for global outdial
- Union of Public Services, (German: Gewerkschaft Öffentlicher Dienst, GÖD)

== See also ==
- Dear God (disambiguation)
- Mister God
- God and Satan (disambiguation)
- God mode (disambiguation)
- Goddess (disambiguation)
- Good (disambiguation)
- My God (disambiguation)
- Oh My God (disambiguation)
- The Godz (disambiguation)
