= Lord of the Universe (disambiguation) =

Lord of the Universe is a 1974 documentary film on Guru Maharaj Ji (Prem Rawat).

Lord of the Universe may also refer to:

- God in monotheistic traditions including Judaism, Christianity, and Islam
- Shiva in his role as creator in Bhakti literature
- Gautama Buddha (c. 5th to 4th century BCE), founder of the world religion of Buddhism
- Prem Rawat (born 1957), a religious teacher formerly known as Guru Maharaj Ji

== See also ==
- Lord of Universe Church, a Chinese salvationist sect
- Adon Olam (Hebrew: אֲדוֹן עוֹלָם, lit. 'Eternal Lord; Lord of the World'), a Jewish hymn
- Lord (disambiguation)
- Universe (disambiguation)
- God (disambiguation)
- Hermetic Order of the Golden Dawn, a secret society devoted to study of the occult in the late 19th and early 20th centuries
