= Goddess of victory =

Goddess of victory may refer to:

== Mythology ==
- Nike (mythology), Greek goddess who personifies victory
- Victoria (mythology), Roman goddess of victory
- Durga, Hindu goddess of victory

== Statues ==
- Altare della Patria, features two statues of Victoria riding on quadrigas in Rome
- Dewey Monument, a statue at Union Square, San Francisco
- Winged Victory of Samothrace, a marble sculpture displayed at the Louvre
- Victory, 1902 statue in New York City by Augustus Saint-Gaudens

== See also ==
- Victory column
- Goddess of Victory: Nikke, a video game
- Winged Victory (disambiguation)
