= Winged Victory (disambiguation) =

Winged Victory may refer to:

- Winged Victory of Samothrace, a sculpture of the Greek goddess Nike in the Louvre Museum
- Winged Victory of Brescia, a sculpture of the Roman goddess Victoria in the Capitolium of Brixia

May also refer to:

- Winged victories, a pair of personifications of victory frequently depicted in art, especially in architectural sculpture
- Winged Victory (novel), a semi-autobiographical novel by Victor Maslin Yeates
- Winged Victory (play), a 1943 play by Moss Hart
  - Winged Victory (film), a 1944 film by George Cukor based on the play
- Winged Victory (Lewis), a group statue in Olympia, Washington, United States, London, including a copy of the Samothrace figure

== See also ==
- Nike (mythology)
- Victoria (mythology)
