= God mode =

God mode may refer to:

- Godmode, a 2023 album by rock band In This Moment
- God mode, a general purpose term for a cheat code in video games that makes a player invincible
- God Mode (video game), a 2013 video game released for Windows PCs and consoles
- "God Mode" (Person of Interest), an episode of Person of Interest
- "God Mode" (song) by the rapper 360
- Windows Master Control Panel shortcut, sometimes referred to as Windows God Mode

== See also ==
- Glossary of video game terms § God mode
