= God and Satan =

God and Satan may refer to:

- God and Satan
- "God and Satan" (song), a 2010 song by Biffy Clyro
- "God and Satan", an essay by Alan Watts in the 1953 book Myth and Ritual in Christianity

== See also ==
- Book of Job 1
- God (disambiguation)
- Satan (disambiguation)
