= Goddess (disambiguation) =

A goddess is a female deity.

Goddess may also refer to:

== Film ==
- Goddess: How I fell in Love, a 2004 Russian drama film
- Goddess (2013 film), an Australian romantic comedy film
- The Goddess (1915 film), an American silent film, with a screenplay by Charles Goddard
- The Goddess (1934 film), a Chinese silent film
- The Goddess (1958 film), an American drama film
- Devi (1960 film) (The Goddess), an Indian drama film by Satyajit Ray
- The Goddess of 1967, a 2000 Australian film featuring the purchase of a Citroën DS

== Music ==
- Fay Milton, also known as Goddess, a drummer for the English rock band Savages
- Goddess (band), a 1991–1994 Dutch Eurodance group

=== Albums ===
- Goddess (Banks album) or the title song, 2014
- Goddess (Emm Gryner album) or the title song, 2009
- Goddess (Goddess album), 2025
- The Goddess – Music for the Ancient of Days, by John Zorn, 2010
- Goddess, by Shawna Russell, 2008
- Goddess, by Soho, 1990

=== Songs ===
- "Goddess" (Laufey song), 2024
- "Goddess", by Avril Lavigne from Head Above Water, 2019
- "Goddess", by Crime & the City Solution from American Twilight, 2013
- "Goddess", by Iggy Azalea from The New Classic, 2014
- "Goddess", by Jaira Burns, 2019
- "Goddess", by Jefferson Starship from Windows of Heaven, 1998
- "Goddess", by Miroslav Vitous and Jan Garbarek from Atmos, 1993
- "Goddess", by Pentagram from Show 'Em How, 2004
- "Goddess", by Pvris from Evergreen, 2023
- "The Goddess", by Jesper Kyd from the film Tumbbad, 2018

== Other uses ==
- Goddess (comics), an aspect of the Marvel Comics character Adam Warlock
- Goddess movement, a group of people interested in the social and religious aspects of the Goddess since the 1970s
- Triple Goddess (Neopaganism)
- Goddess, anglicized form of Déesse, nickname of the Citroën DS
- God (MUD), in its feminine form, referring to an administrator of a MUD
- Column of the Goddess, or the Goddess, nickname for the Memorial of the Siege of 1792, in Lille, France
- "The Goddess", former nickname of WWE Wrestler Alexa Bliss.
- The Goddess (short story), a 1974 short story by Joyce Carol Oates
- Goddess: The Secret Lives of Marilyn Monroe, 1985 non-fiction book by Anthony Summers

== See also ==
- Category:Goddesses
- Oh My Goddess (disambiguation)
- Goddess of victory (disambiguation)
- Goddess worship (disambiguation)
- Gods (disambiguation)
- Gender of God
- God (disambiguation)
