= Winged Victory of Brescia =

Bronze statue from the 1st century AD in Brescia, Italy

- Vittoria alata di Brescia (Italian)
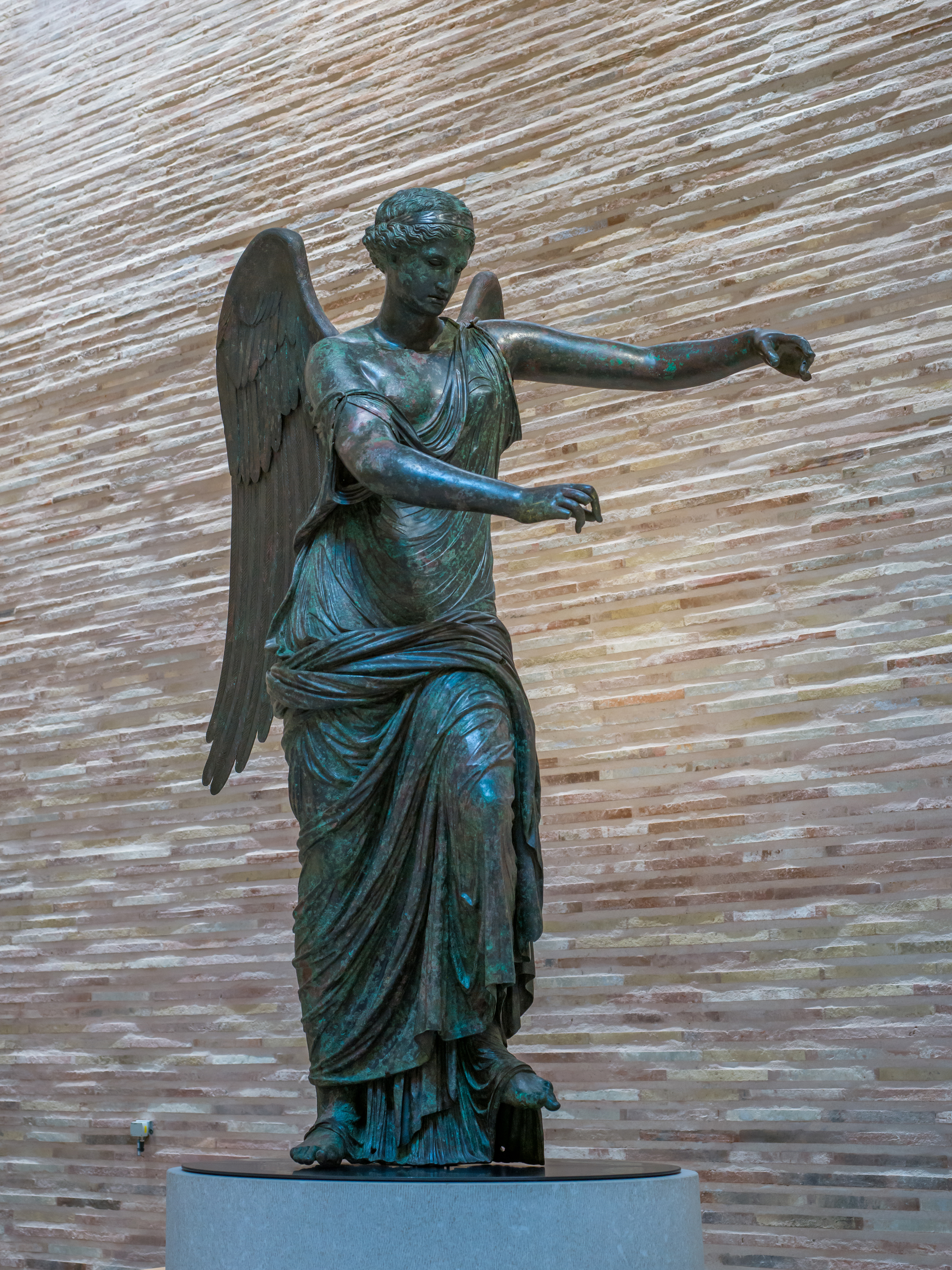
- Winged Victory in the Capitolium after restoration
- Artist: Unknown
- Completion date: 1st century AD
- Medium: bronze
- Dimensions: 195 cm (77 in)
- Location: Brescia, Italy

The Winged Victory of Brescia is a bronze statue from the 1st century AD housed at the Capitolium of Brescia, where it was discovered in 1826 along with other Roman bronzes. The work is one of the symbols of the city of Brescia.

== History and description ==
Initially believed to be a Hellenistic work executed around the mid-3rd century BC by a Greek master and later reworked in Roman imperial times, based on studies conducted in the early 19th century, the statue was recognized as a pastiche, meaning an assemblage created in Roman times, likely after 69 AD, based on a previous Hellenistic casting. The new restoration by the Opificio delle Pietre Dure has established that the statue was cast in the 1st century AD in a local foundry and is not an assemblage of different statues but was created to be a "Winged Victory." The reference model is identified as the Afrodite Urania of the "Cyrene type," meaning the goddess conceived in that specific variation of posture found in the statue discovered at Cyrene. Other details, such as the torsion of the torso and the positioning of the arms, are similarly derived from Greek works of the 5th–6th century BC. The figure wears a chiton fastened at the shoulders and a himation that wraps around the lower limbs. The left leg is slightly raised, as it is believed the foot rested on the helmet of Mars; to complete the work, a silver and copper damascening was placed on the head to adorn the hair. In Roman times, wings were added to transform the work into the goddess Victoria; similar works (Victory inscribing a shield) were present in Rome and Constantinople in the imperial forums. After centuries of oblivion, the work was discovered on the evening of July 20, 1826, partially disassembled and carefully hidden in the western cavity of the Capitolium between the temple and the Cidneo, along with many other bronze pieces, including a series of portraits, likely to prevent it from being melted down for weapons during invasions by barbarian peoples (Goths and Huns). This explains its exceptional state of preservation.

With the advent of World War I, the Victory, along with numerous other works of artistic and cultural heritage, was transferred to Rome by order of the government as a precaution to keep them safe from the front lines. After the conflict, Senator Pompeo Gherardo Molmenti was appointed Undersecretary for Antiquities and Fine Arts, tasked with ensuring that the masterpieces moved to Rome were returned to their original locations; Molmenti personally oversaw the transport and return of the Victory to Brescia, which took place with a solemn celebration in April 1920.

The statue was loaned and exhibited from November 1948 to March 1949 at the Kunsthaus Zürich museum for the event exhibition titled Kunstschätze der Lombardei. 500 vor Christus, 1800 nach Christus.

According to early studies, a hypothesis was formulated about how the statue arrived in Brescia. According to this hypothesis, the statue was transported to Rome at the behest of Augustus after the death of Cleopatra in 29 BC and then donated directly to Brixia as a sign of political goodwill, perhaps on the occasion of the city being granted the title of Colonia Augusta. The work was then transformed into Nike after the Second Battle of Bedriacum, which marked the triumph of Marcus Antonius Primus, lieutenant of Vespasian, over Vitellius. It was Vespasian himself, after the battle that enabled his rise to the throne, who ordered the monumental renovation of the forum and the Capitoline temple of the city, and it was assumed that the statue's transformation from Aphrodite to Victory occurred on this occasion. The goddess's posture would have changed from the vanity of gazing at herself to the act of writing a dedicatory inscription with a stylus on the shield of Ares, which was later lost, while two large feathered wings were mounted on her back.

The consensus on the previous hypothesis, which had long been predominant, weakened following further investigations conducted using X-ray fluorescence. The analyses revealed no significant differences between the wings and the body of the statue, an homogeneity that likely indicated the work was created in a single constructive process. The sculpture was analyzed and studied by Edilberto Formigli and Andrea Salcuni as part of a research project by the Institute of Archaeological Sciences of the Goethe University Frankfurt. In July 2018, the work was entrusted to experts from the Opificio delle Pietre Dure, assisted by specialists from the Sapienza University of Rome; the statue underwent restoration and was the subject of a joint interdisciplinary study involving archaeologists, scientific consultants, engineers, and restorers.

After the restoration, a structure—designed by Spanish architect Juan Navarro Baldeweg who also redesigned its display—was created at the Capitolium to house the monument, equipped with a new earthquake-resistant base.

== Details ==
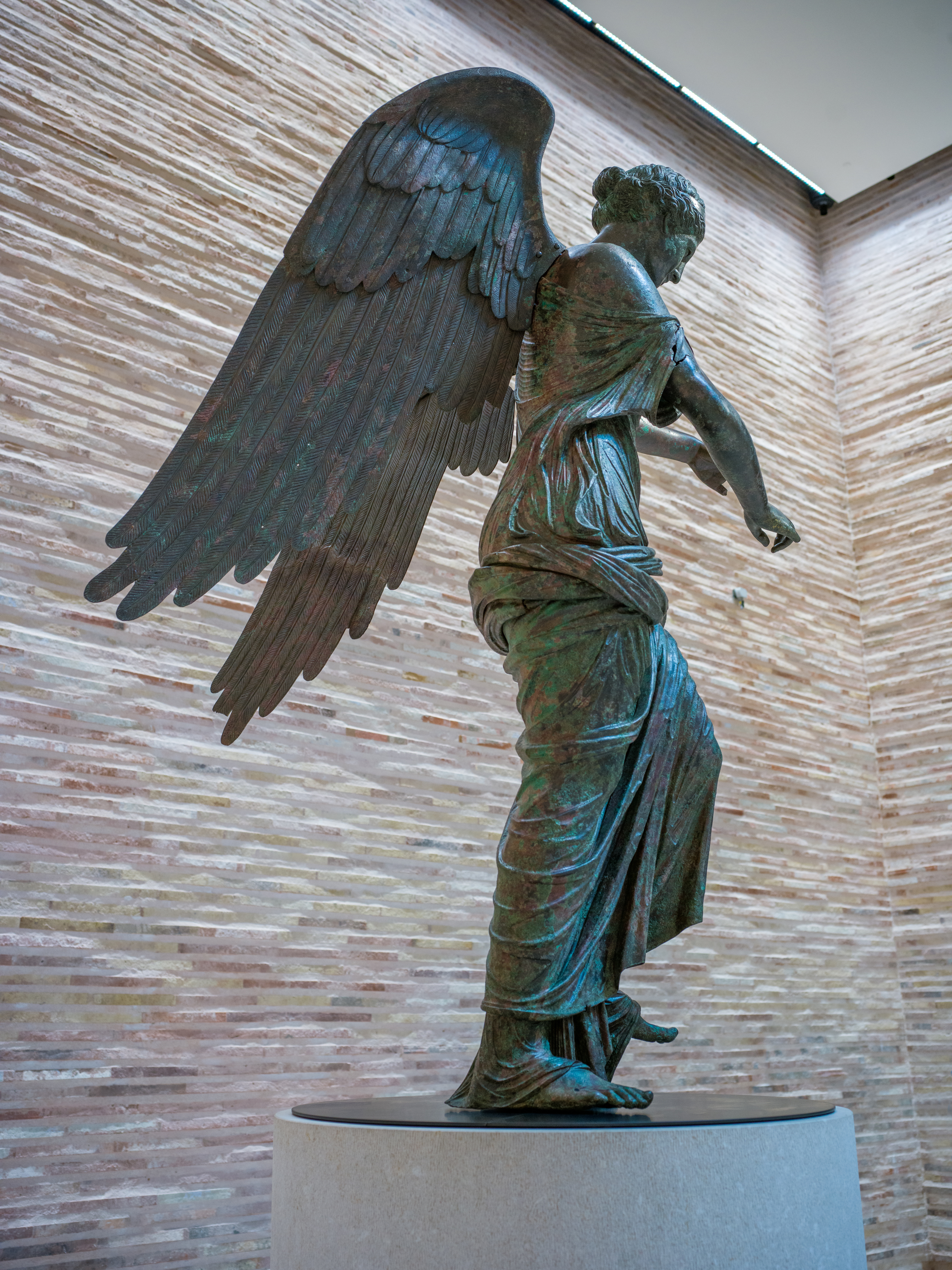

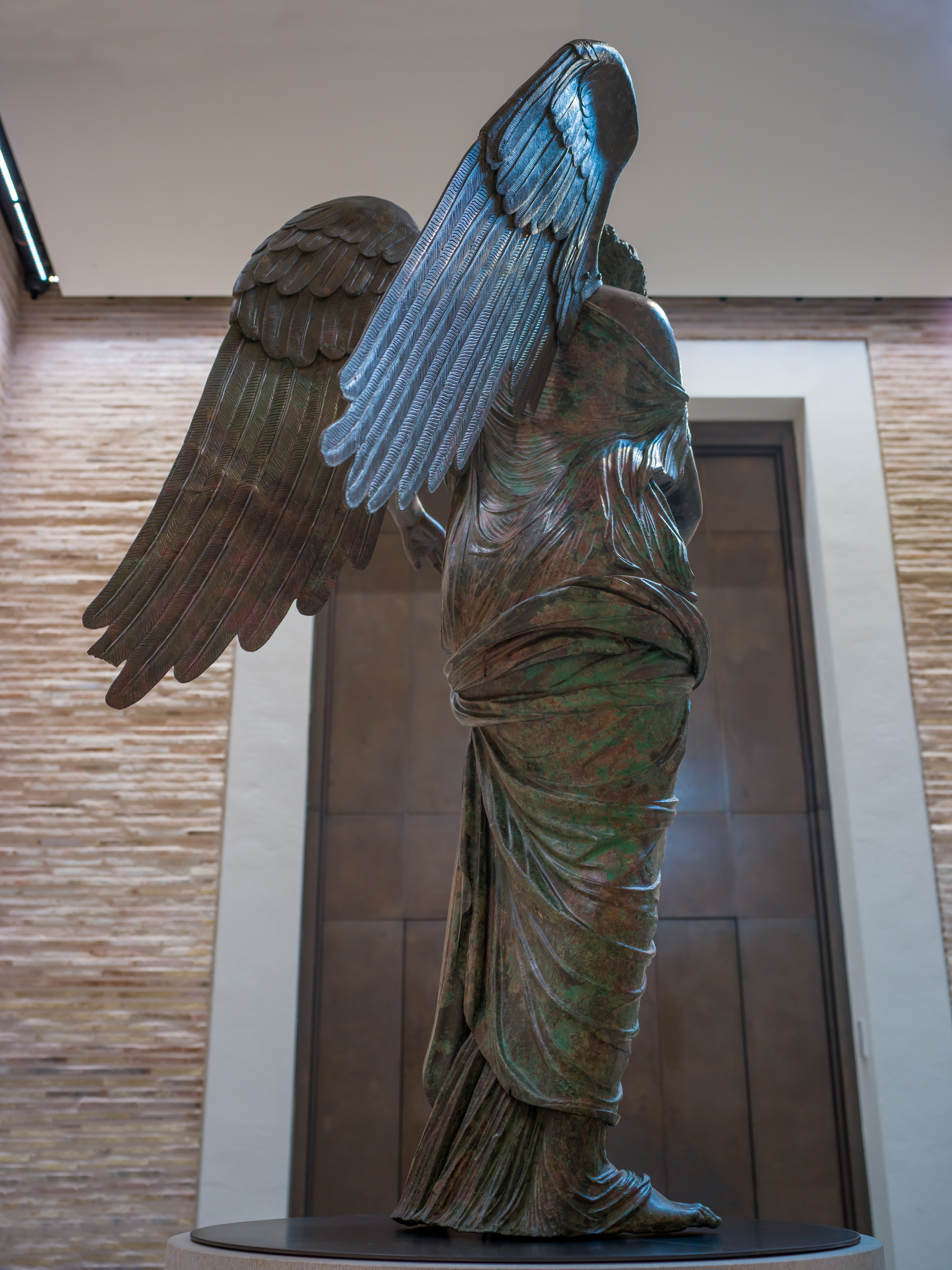

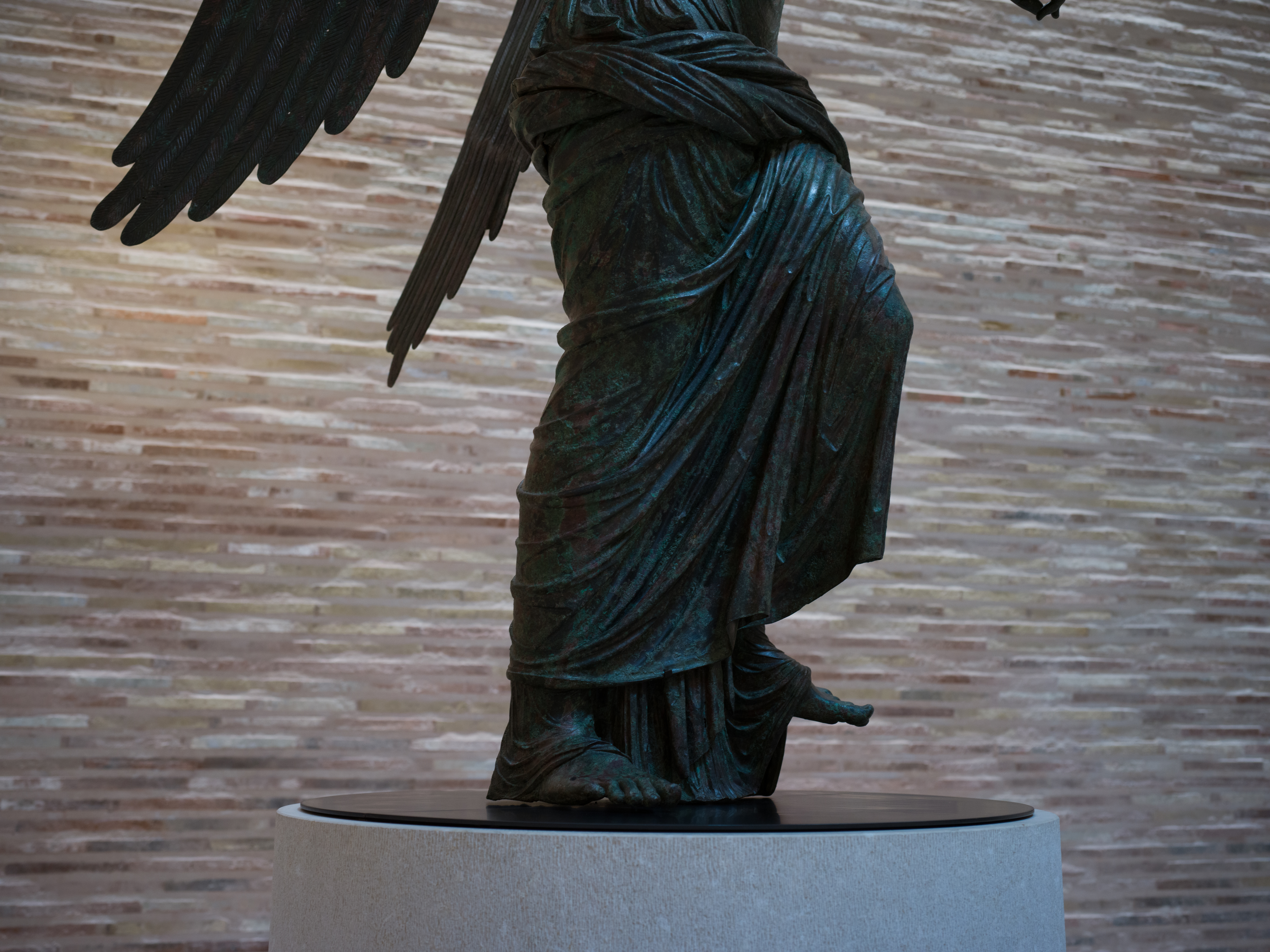

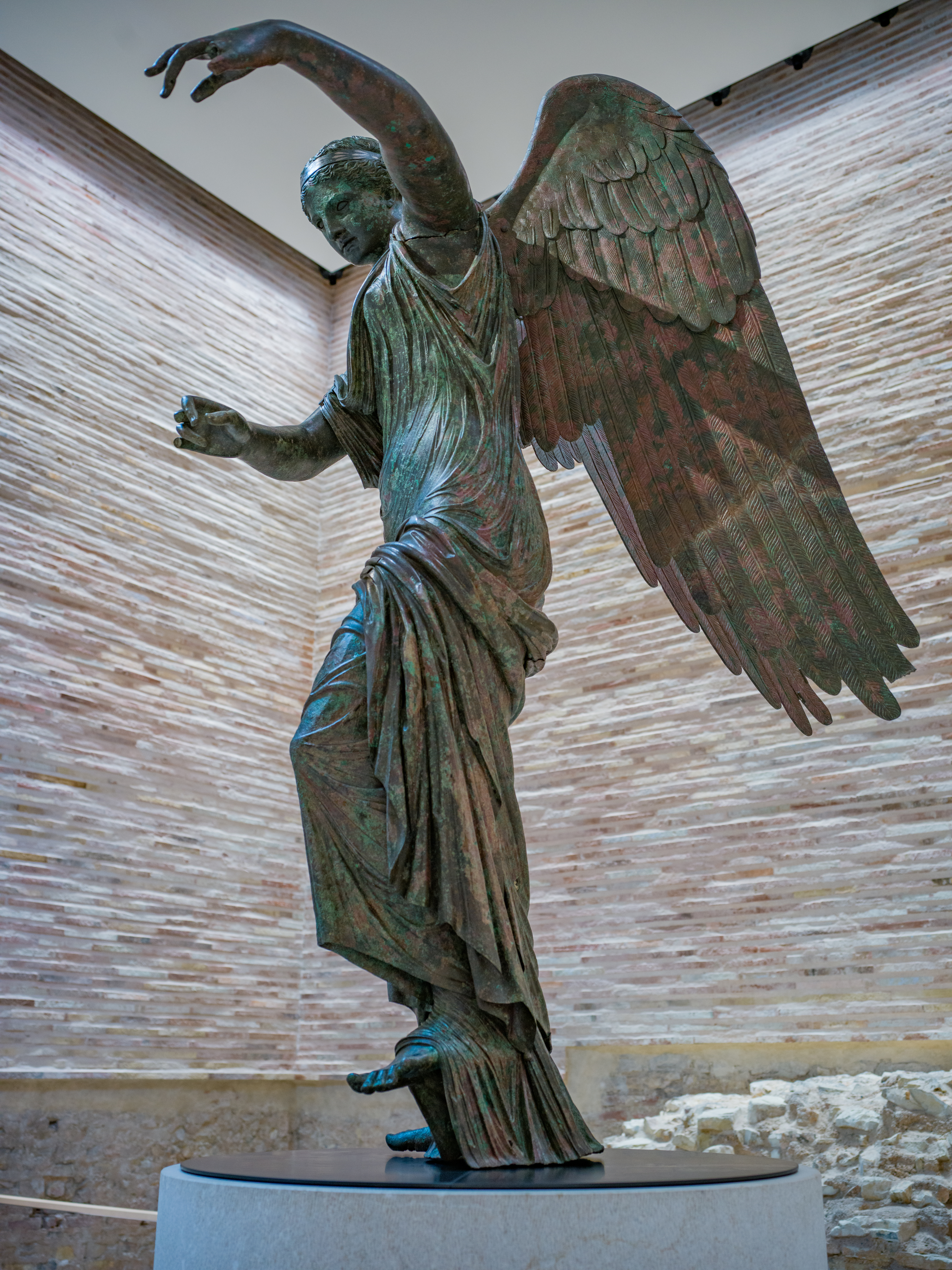

== The Winged Victory of Brescia in the world ==
Italy

- Bologna: Plaster cast at the gypsotheque of the Archaeological Civic Museum of Bologna
- Bolsena: Gilded bronze reproduction, atop the marble column of the war memorial.
- Brescia: The original Winged Victory housed at the Capitolium
- Brescia: Copy housed at Palazzo della Loggia, originally intended for the American president Woodrow Wilson.
- Brescia: 1935 bronze reproduction, donated by Roberto Ferrari, located in the "Cloister of Memory" of the former Santi Cosma e Damiano
- Brescia: Reproduction, donated by the Rotary Club, placed at the center of the roundabout on Via Labirinto.
- Carcare: 1919 bronze reproduction by Paolo Enrico De Barbieri, part of the war memorial in Piazza Guglielmo Marconi.
- Gardone Riviera: Wingless bronze copy, commissioned in 1934 by Gabriele D’Annunzio to sculptor Renato Brozzi for placement in the Tempietto della Vittoria at the Vittoriale degli Italiani.
- Isorella: Reproduction placed in Piazza Roma, in front of the town hall.
- Passo del Tonale: Copy created in the 1920s by sculptor Timo Bortolotti for the Victory Monument, later incorporated into the Tonale Military Memorial.
- Rome: Plaster cast at the Museum of Roman Civilization.
- Rome: Copy at Palazzo Chigi.
- Rovereto: Reproduction at the Italian War History Museum housed in the Rovereto Castle
- Trento: Bronze reproduction at the Fondazione Museo Storico del Trentino
- Santicolo in Corteno Golgi: Bronze reproduction atop the war memorial.

France

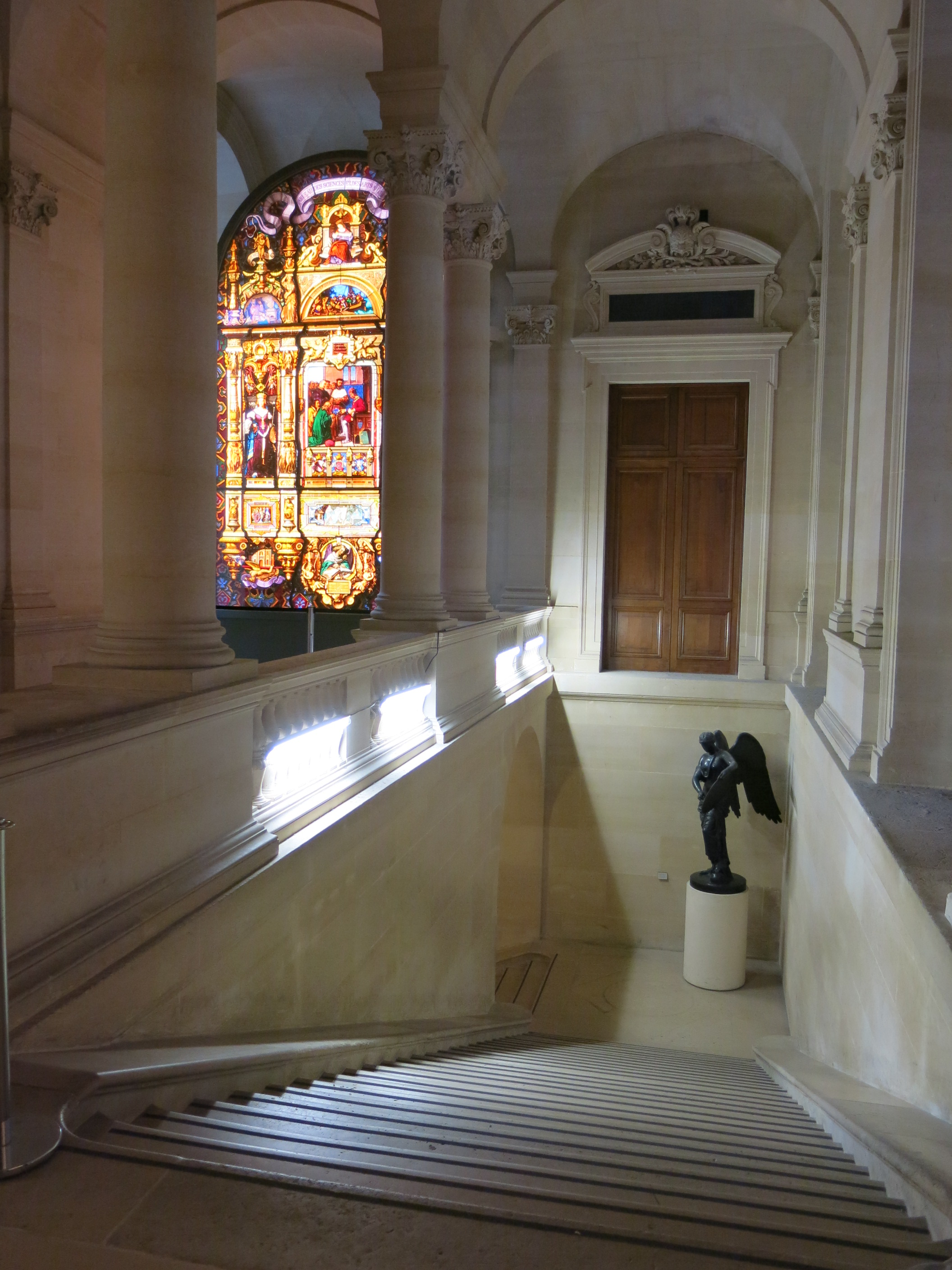
Reproduction at the Escalier Colbert in the Louvre Museum in Paris

- Paris: Bronze reproduction along the Escalier Colbert in the Louvre Museum. The copy was cast in 1861 at the Parisian foundry of "Eck et Durand" thanks to the plaster cast made by Pietro Pierotti and donated by the city of Brescia to Napoleon III after the victory in the Battle of Solferino in 1859.
- Paris: Plaster copy in the atrium of the private residence of Louis-Napoléon located on Avenue Montaigne.
- Versailles: Plaster cast by Pietro Pierotti, housed in the Louvre's storage facilities located in the Versailles stables

Germany

- Berlin: Plaster copy at the gypsotheque of the Berlin State Museums.
- Berlin: Plaster cast at the Abguss-Sammlung Antiker Plastik of the Free University of Berlin.
- Dresden: Plaster copy sent to the Dresden Academy of Fine Arts in 1873

United Kingdom

- Cambridge: Plaster copy, purchased by Louis Alexander Fagan in 1877, for the gypsotheque of the Fitzwilliam Museum

Czech Republic

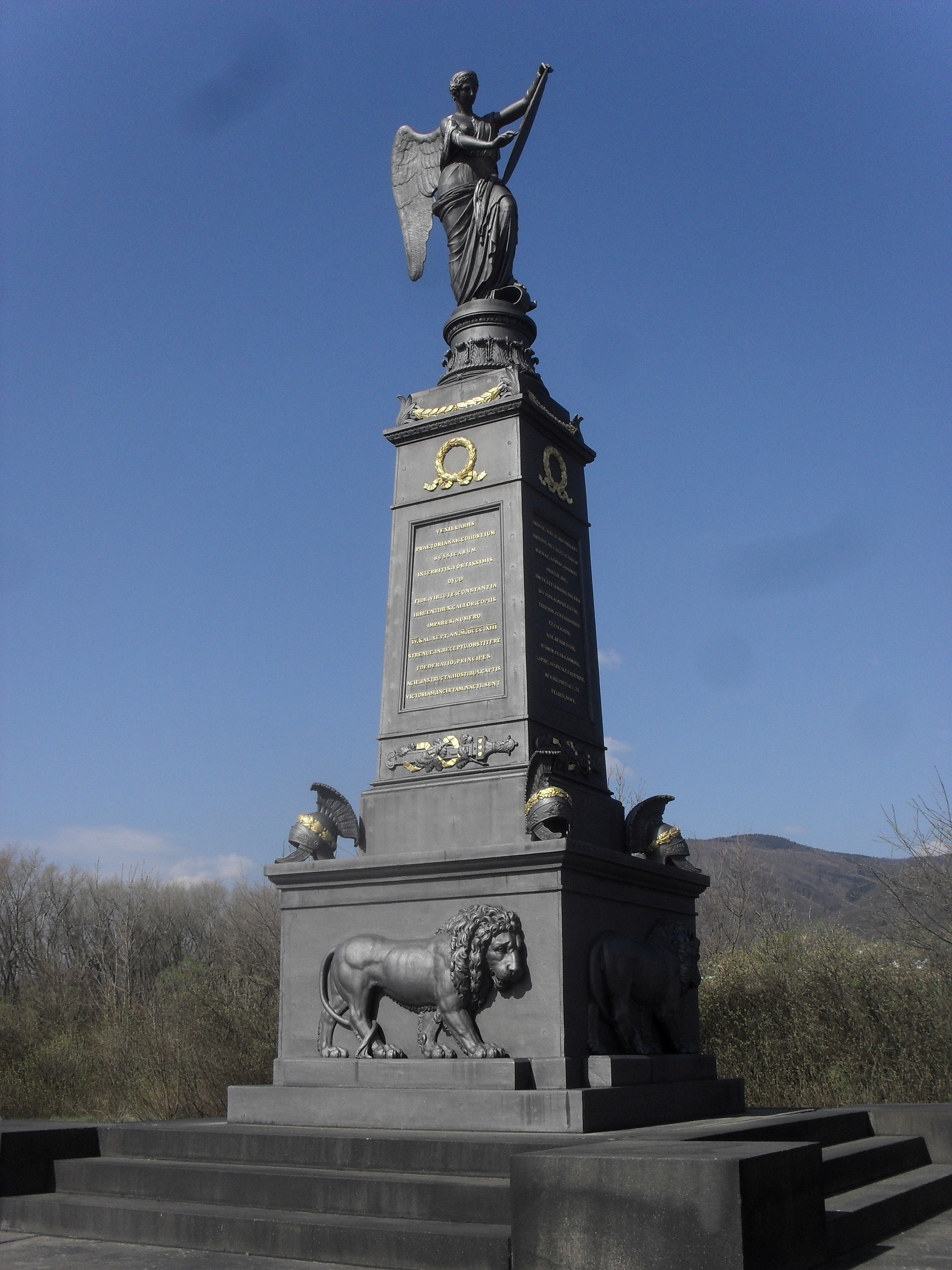
Reproduction at Přestanov in the Czech Republic

- Přestanov: Large-scale reproduction atop the column of the monument, designed by architect Pietro Nobile in 1836, commemorating the victory against Napoleon Bonaparte in Bohemia.

Russia

- Saint Petersburg: At the Stieglitz Museum

Spain

- Valladolid: Plaster replica granted in 1888 to the Museo de reproducciones artísticas in Madrid, where it was housed until the end of 2011, when the museum was absorbed by the National Sculpture Museum in Valladolid

United States

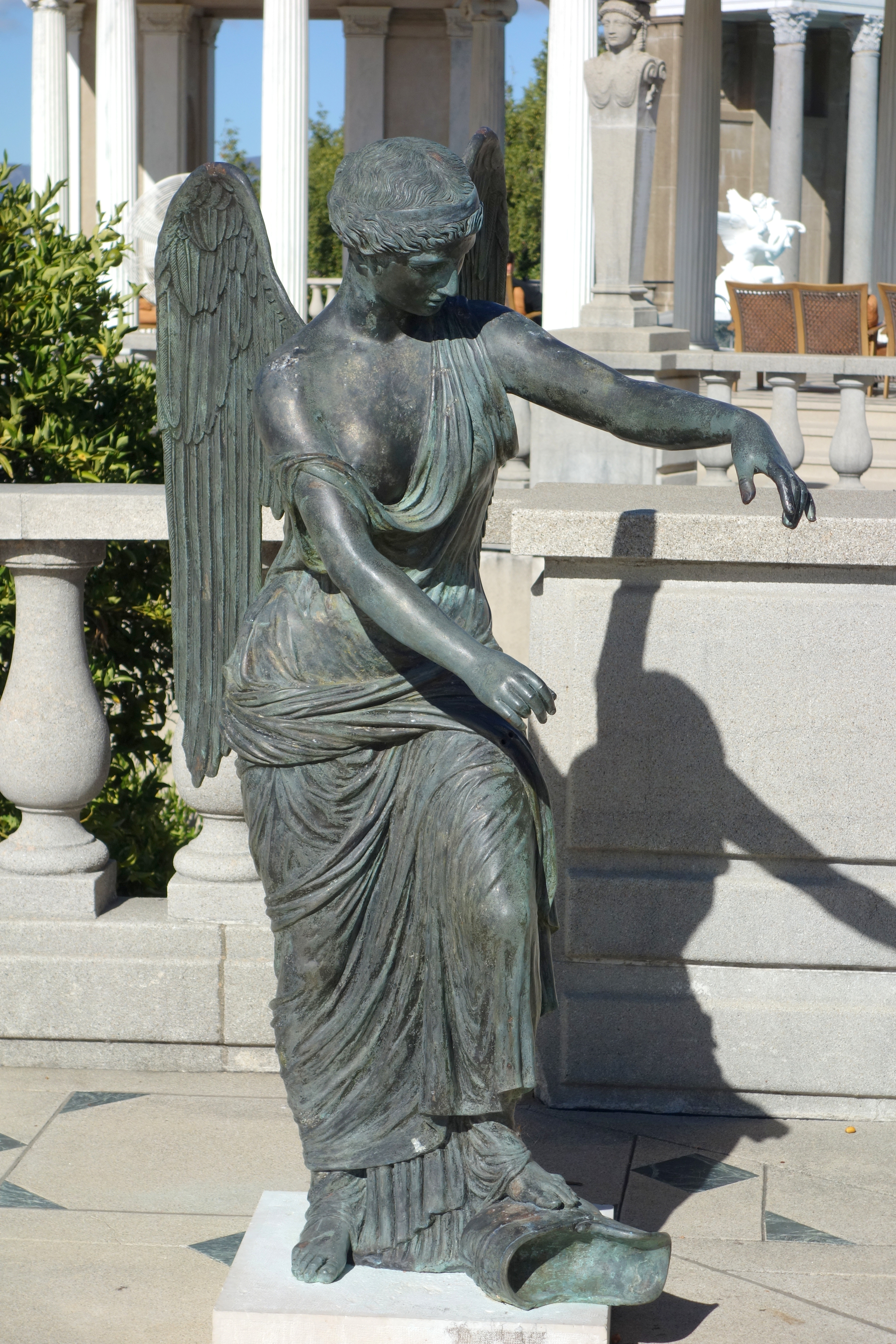
Reproduction by Umberto Marcellini, at Hearst Castle in California

- Boston: At the Museum of Fine Arts
- New York City: Plaster cast at the Metropolitan Museum of Art
- San Simeon: Bronze replica at Hearst Castle in California, by sculptor Umberto Marcellini in the early 20th century

Switzerland

- Zurich: Zurich Museum

== In popular culture ==
=== Philately ===
The Victory of Brescia was the subject of a series of stamps of the Kingdom of Italy, created by Alberto Repettati, for the third anniversary of the victory in the Battle of Vittorio Veneto. The series, printed by the Turin paper securities office, was issued by Italian Post on November 1, 1921, and also in the Italian colonies of Eritrea, Libya, and Italian Somalia.

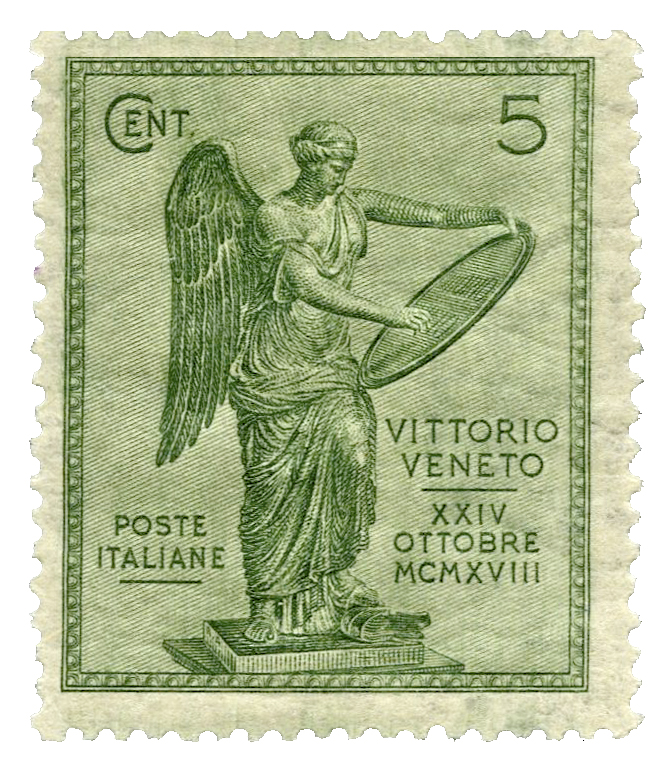

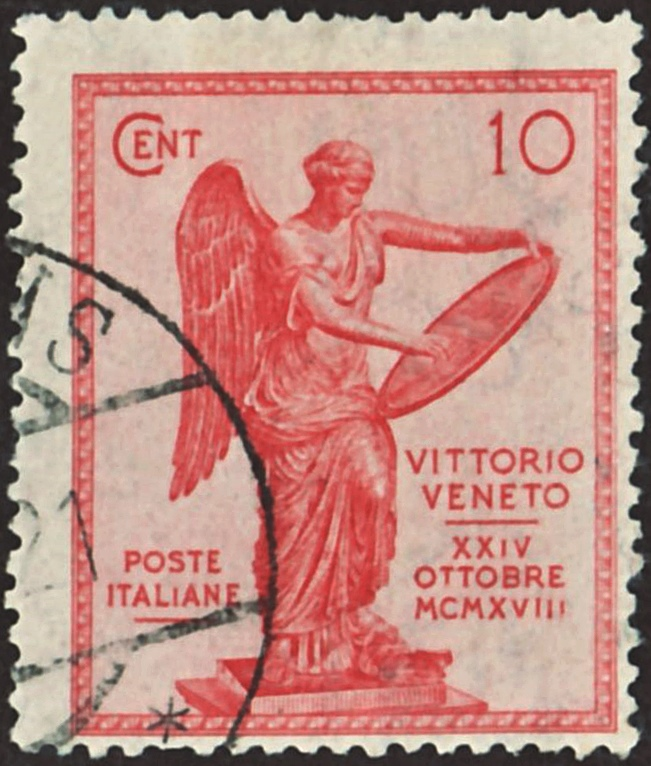

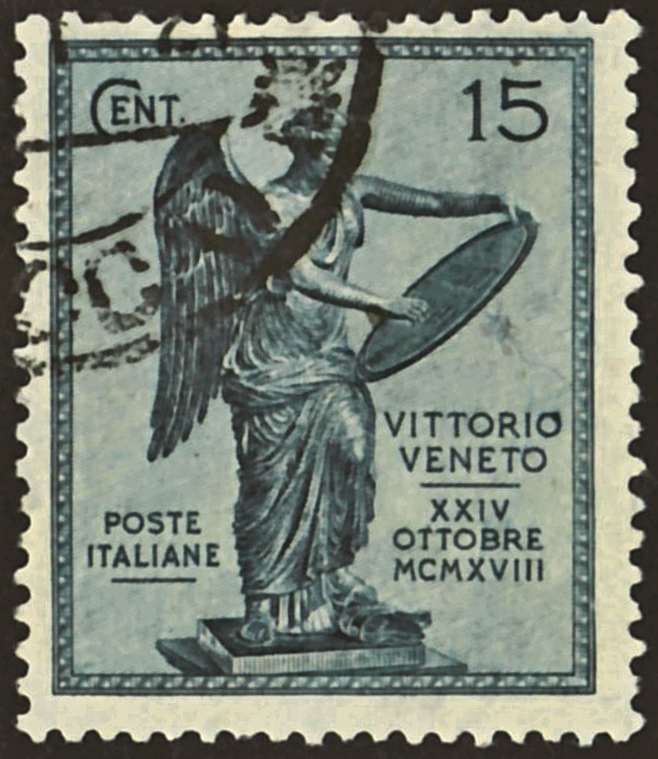

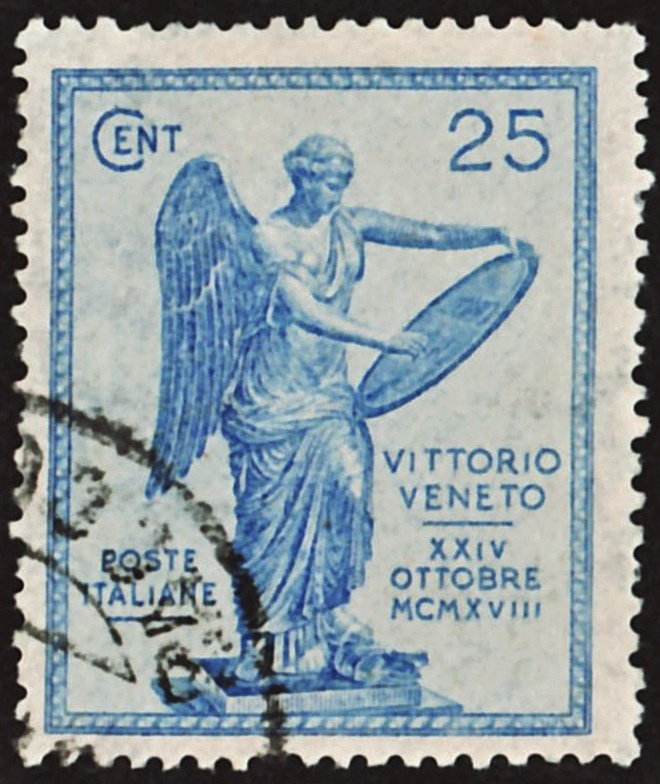

On the occasion of the restoration, on November 21, 2020, the Ministry of Economic Development issued a new stamp, printed by the Istituto Poligrafico e Zecca dello Stato, depicting the statue in a stylized graphic by Paolo Tassinari.

=== Civic image ===
On the occasion of the "First International Air Circuit," the first Italian aviation event held from September 8 to 20, 1909, between Montichiari and Ghedi, the Winged Victory of Brescia was used as a civic symbol in informational and promotional materials related to the event. A similar example was the use of the statue's image in illustrations for tourism promotion of the city of Brescia by the ENIT.

=== Literature ===
Antoine-Claude Pasquin Valéry dedicates a chapter to it in his work Voyages historiques et littéraire en Italie.

Giosuè Carducci celebrated it in the Alcaic ode Alla Vittoria, written in May 1877, included in the Barbarian Odes, and inspired by two visits the poet made to Brescia, the first in the summer of 1871 with Carolina Cristofori, the second in October 1876.

Gabriele D’Annunzio was reverently fascinated by the Victory and celebrated it extensively throughout his life: it appears in the sonnet dedicated to Brescia, included in Elettra (D'Annunzio), the second book of the Laudi, and it inspired him so much that he depicted it in the novel Forse che sì forse che no.

The magazine Topolino dedicated a comic story to it in issue number 3391.

=== Numismatics ===
A detail of the statue's face is depicted on the reverse of the first coin in the 2023 Italian Republic numismatic collection, issued on February 20, 2023, and dedicated to the cities of Bergamo and Brescia as Italian Capitals of Culture for 2023.

== See also ==
- Santa Giulia Museum
- Venus de Milo

== Bibliography ==
- Clara Stella, ed. (2003). Brixia. Scoperte e riscoperte [Brixia. Discoveries and Rediscoveries] (in Italian). Milano: Skira. ISBN 978-88-8491-540-5.
- Lorenzo Bonoldi; Monica Centanni; Luana Lovisetto (2003). "Venus volubilis/venusta Victoria. Tradimenti, travestimenti, capricci, denudamenti dell'Afrodite di Brescia" [Venus Volubilis/Venusta Victoria. Betrayals, Disguises, Whims, and Unveilings of the Aphrodite of Brescia]. La Rivista di Engramma. La tradizione classica nella memoria occidentale. Third series (in Italian) (25). Venezia: Associazione Culturale Engramma. ISSN 1826-901X.
- Lorenzo Bonoldi (2005). "Nachleben e vittorie postume della Venus Victrix di Brescia" [Afterlife and Posthumous Victories of the Venus Victrix of Brescia]. La Rivista di Engramma. La tradizione classica nella memoria occidentale. Third series (in Italian) (41). Venezia: Associazione Culturale Engramma. ISSN 1826-901X.
- Pierfabio Panazza (2013). "La Vittoria Alata a Parigi: testimonianze inedite dall'archivio della famiglia Lechi" [The Winged Victory in Paris: Unpublished Testimonies from the Lechi Family Archive] (PDF). Commentari dell'Ateneo di Brescia (in Italian). per l’anno 2008. Brescia: Fratelli Geroldi: 69–102. ISSN 0375-6181.
- Pietro Lechi (2013). "Nuovi inediti intorno alla Vittoria Alata. Con cenni sull'origine dei documenti nell'archivio di famiglia" [New Unpublished Documents on the Winged Victory. With Notes on the Origin of Documents in the Family Archive] (PDF). Commentari dell'Ateneo di Brescia (in Italian). per l’anno 2008. Brescia: Fratelli Geroldi: 103–112. ISSN 0375-6181.
- Marco Taddia (2012). Arnaudon e la Vittoria Alata di Brescia [Arnaudon and the Winged Victory of Brescia] (PDF). Storia della Chimica applicata alla conservazione dei Beni Culturali, Roma, June 14, 2010. series V (in Italian). Vol. 34 (1 ed.). Roma: Aracne Editrice. pp. 199–211. ISBN 978-88-548-4598-5. ISSN 0392-4130.
- Andrea Salcuni; Edilberto Formigli, eds. (2011). Grandi bronzi romani dall'Italia settentrionale. Brescia, Cividate Camuno e Verona [Large Roman Bronzes from Northern Italy. Brescia, Cividate Camuno, and Verona] (in Italian). Bonn: Dr. Rudolf Habelt Verlag. ISBN 978-3-7749-3762-8.
- Gian Paolo Treccani (2010). ""Liberare i segni di Roma". Archeologia e centro storico nel caso di Brescia, 1823–1941" ["Liberating the Signs of Rome. Archaeology and the historic center in the case of Brescia, 1823–1941]. In Gian Paolo Treccani (ed.). Aree archeologiche e centri storici. Costituzione dei Parchi archeologici e processi di trasformazione urbana [Archaeological Areas and Historic Centers. Establishment of Archaeological Parks and Urban Transformation Processes] (in Italian). Milano: FrancoAngeli. pp. 63–91. ISBN 978-88-568-2255-7.
- Francesca Morandini; Anna Patera, eds. (2021). La Vittoria Alata di Brescia. Non ho visto nulla di più bello [The Winged Victory of Brescia. I Have Seen Nothing More Beautiful] (in Italian). Milano: Skira. ISBN 9788857244471.
