= Antichrist (virus hoax) =

Virus hoaxes

"Antichrist", or Anticristo, was a Spanish-language computer virus hoax distributed via email in 2001.

== Email Contents ==
The email was detected by Symantec, who is the owner of the popular web security service known as “Norton”, on July 17, 2001. The Spanish text of the email translates to

ALERT: THE WORST VIRUS IN HISTORY.
A new virus has just been discovered that has been classified by Microsoft and Mcafee as the most destructive of all time. This virus was discovered yesterday and is known by the name of ANTICHRIST; no antivirus has been discovered; it simply destroys the zeroth sector of the hard disk, where vital information for its operation is kept.
It works in the following way:
1. -) It sends itself to all the names in your address book with the title:
"SURPRISE?!!!!!!!!!!"
2. -) As soon as it is installed, it destroys the zeroth sector and in this way it permanently destroys the hard disk. Please send this E-mail to as many people as you can; in case you receive an e-mail with subject "SURPRISE?!!!!!!!!!!!!!!!!!!!!!!!!!!", get advice from an expert because it can install itself automatically.

== ”Antichrist” Summary ==
This email virus hoax was short lived during the month of July in 2001. There is an association made between McAfee and the Antichrist made in an angry blog post, but that is purely up for speculation. The virus hoax threatened to destroy the hard drive of the computer in use. As is known about virus hoaxes, they do not cause any real harm if there is no attachment containing a virus in the email, but they in fact can still cause damage.

Virus hoaxes, similar to “Antichrist,” can cause damage outside of the binary realm. They can cause false hysteria about a non-existent virus and be an overall time waster.
