= The Godz (Ohio band) =

American rock band

- Origin: Columbus, Ohio, U.S.
- Genres: Hard rock, classic rock
- Years active: 1976–2026
- Labels: RJDJ, FHS, F-N-A, Garddog, Ridgeline studios, Casablanca, Grudge, Cobra
- Members: Mark Chatfield; Doug "Sav" Ramey; Steve Mitchell; Keith Pickens; Julie Neal
- Past members: Eric Moore (d. 2019); Bob Goodwin; Robert Gibson "Bob" Hill; Glen Cataline (d. 2019); Matt Mees; Ty Beebe (d. 2025) Deron Loevenguth; Eric Mauk; Terry Evans (d. 2019)
- Website: www.TheGodzUSA.com

The Godz are an American hard rock band from Columbus, Ohio, that formed in 1976.

== History ==
Formed in 1976, the band conceived their moniker only to later learn of a band from New York City already known as the Godz. A monetary settlement allowed them to keep their name. The Godz did not have a recording contract when they hit the road with Cheap Trick in 1977. Bassist/vocalist Eric Moore, guitarist/vocalist Mark Chatfield, guitarist Bob Hill, and drummer Glen Cataline, the Midwestern "biker metal" act built a legendary regional following at venues like the Cleveland Agora Ballroom.

They quickly hit the national stage, releasing their 1978 self-titled debut The Godz on Millennium Records. They played on the road with Angel. "Godz are macho, mean biker boys," wrote Sylvie Simmons in 1978. "Their songs are about dope and bikes and rock and sex. They're loud, brash, crude, but a bloody good rock band."

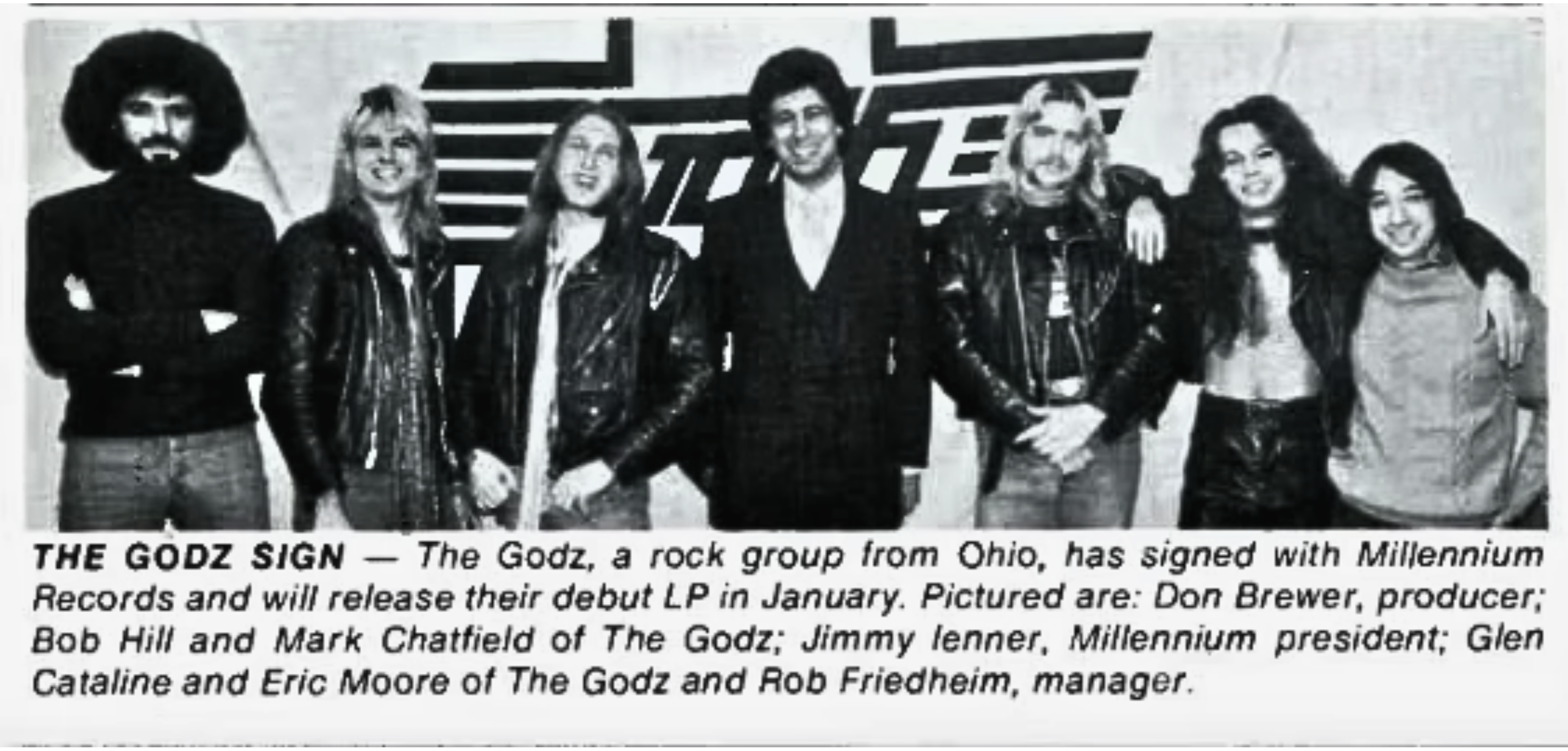
The Godz Sign with Millennium

After hitting the national stage, they released their 1979 sophomore album Nothing is Sacred. Both albums were produced by Grand Funk Railroad drummer Don Brewer. Additionally in 1979, the band's original label, Millennium Records, changed its distribution from Casablanca Records to RCA Records and the Millennium label was subsequently folded altogether. Millennium's parent label, Casablanca Records, picked up The Godz to fulfill their contractual obligation with the band but had no particular enthusiasm for them when their second album, Nothing is Sacred, was released the same year.

1980's

Whatever the group's merits, the Godz went unappreciated by rock critics; the 1983 Rolling Stone Record Guide described them as a "Miserable hard-rock quartet from Columbus/Deavertown, Ohio, epitomiz[ing] the most wretched excesses of Seventies rock." With little label support, the band toured again with Blue Öyster Cult, Kansas, Iggy Pop, and Judas Priest.

By late 1980, suffering from lack of label support and general exhaustion, the original Godz split up, with Eric Moore – a rocker who "makes wildman Nugent look like Andy Williams" – remaining as the only original member, although Mark Chatfield returned at various points. For a few brief times in-and-between the years since 1981, Moore attempted to do away with the "Godz" moniker, calling it among other things, The Eric Moore Band. As 1982 came to a close, The Godz were all but reforming; and were fully ramped-up and back on the road the next year.

The Godz 1985 album, I'll Get You Rockin', a European release on the Heavy Metal America label did quite well, spawning a hit video of the title track in the UK. This activity was followed by Mongolians in 1987, a domestic release on Grudge Records, featuring revamped versions of several tunes from the previous record. It turned out to be one of the best-selling independent albums of the year.

1990's

In 1995, The Godz recorded a live show and released it as Greatest Hits Live.

2000's

In 2003, some new Godz material surfaced on the compilation 25 Moore Years.

== Resurrection, 2019-Present ==
In 2019, Mark Chatfield decided to "resurrect" the band based upon its original concept. Mark contacted Bob Hill who politely declined but was glad to learn of fans still having interest in The Godz. Due to the COVID-19 pandemic, the project was shelved. Then, in 2022, Chatfield contacted previous members Eric Mauk (guitar and vocals) and Keith Pickens (drums) and long time friend of Eric Moore - Doug "Sav" Ramey (vocals and bass), and along with Julie Neal (backup vocals) to complete the resurrected The Godz.

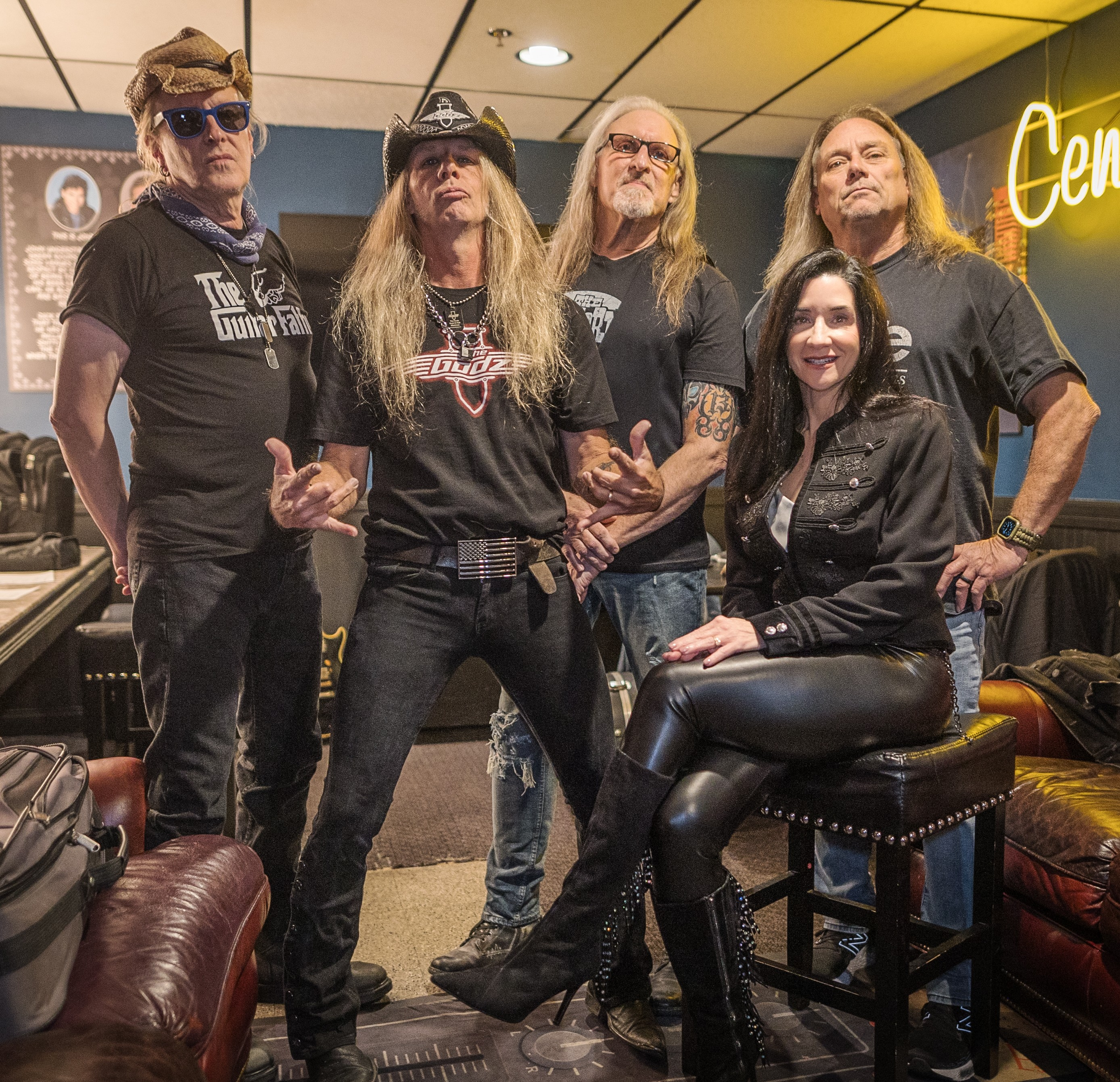
The Godz - 2023

On 22 November 2022, The Godz performed in Columbus, Ohio and have mentioned on the website, social media, and in interviews of a new album being in the works.

In July 2023, The Godz released their latest CD and vinyl Resurrected that consisted of new material and a live version of Chest Fever, along with announcing new member, Steve Mitchell, to replace the departure of Eric Mauk.

== Legacy ==
Glen Cataline, nicknamed "Animal" and drummer on the first two Godz albums, died on April 14, 2019, at age 67.

Eric Moore died on May 17, 2019, after a long battle with bladder cancer. He was 67.

Terry Evans, who was the drummer on the album, Last of the Outlaws, released in April 2012, died unexpectedly in May 2019 at the age of 55.

== Discography ==
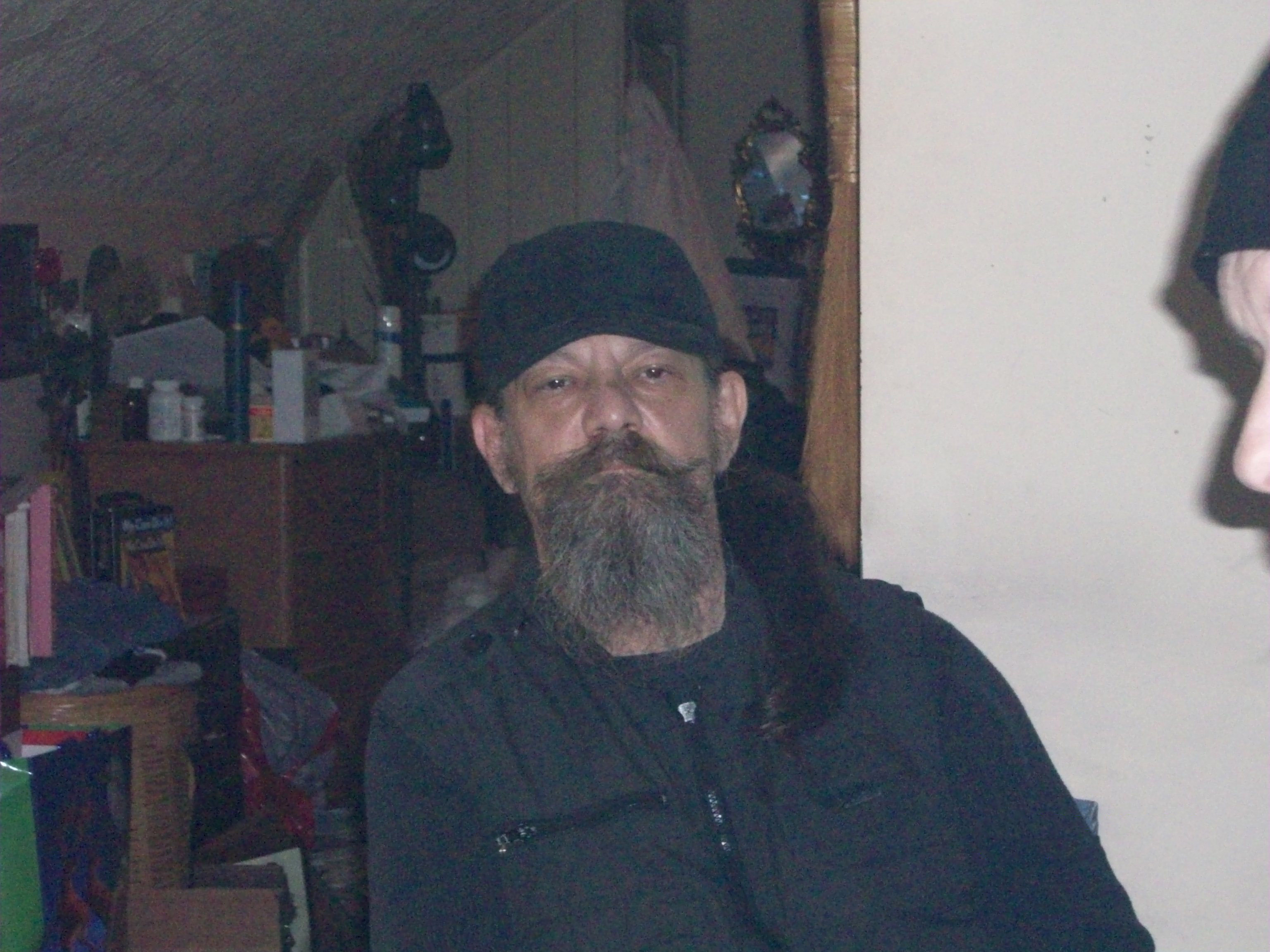
Eric Moore in 2008

- The Godz [1978], US No. 191
- "Under the Table" [1978], NLD No. 50 (Non-album single release)
- Nothing is Sacred [1979], US No. 189
- Vinyl Ecstasy [1981] (Columbus, Ohio radio station WLVQ-FM96 compilation album featuring the Eric Moore single "I Won't Be Lonely Tonight")
- I'll Get You Rockin' [1985]
- Mongolians [1987]
- Greatest Hits Live [1995]
- Power Rock from USA [1997] (Compilation album consisting of the entire first album, plus eight of the ten songs from Nothing Is Sacred. "I Don't Wanna Go Home" is not listed on the CD but plays as the hidden 15th track)
- Eric Moore and The Godz: 25 Moore Years [2003] (2-CD Compilation)
- Last of the Outlaws [2012] (Godz)
- Wasted: Live '93 Bootleg [2013] (Officially released bootleg recording from a 1993 concert)
- Last Rites [2014]
- Resurrected [2023]

== Members ==
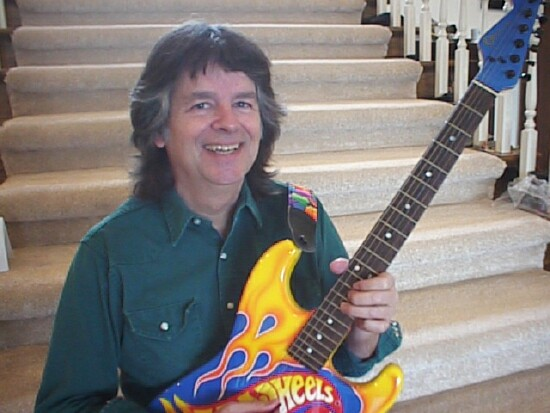
Bob Hill at home in Texas

- Eric Moore - (original member) – lead vocals, bass guitar, May 7, 1952 — May 17, 2019
- Mark Chatfield - (original member) - lead guitar, vocals
- Glen Cataline - (original member) - vocals, drums, September 27, 1951 - April 14, 2019
- Bob Hill - vocals, guitar,keyboards-(original member)
- Doug "Sav" Ramey - vocals and bass
- Matt Mees - vocals, drums
- Eric Mauk - lead guitar
- Steve Mitchell - guitar
- Nikki Storm - guitar
- Tyrus Beebe - guitar
- Mark Carlisle - vocals, guitar, bass guitar
- Bub Adams - bass
- Jeff Boggs - guitar
- Bruce Collins - harmonica
- Julie Neal - vocals
- Kevin Valentine - drums
- Vinnie Salvatore - guitar
- Bob Goodwin - guitar
- Freddie Salem - guitar
- Scott A. Martin - guitar
- Heidi Helser - drums
- Terry Evans - drums
- Keith Pickens - drums
- Jeff Westlake - guitar, vocals (both are studio only)
- Rikki Soga - guitar
- Danny Boyd - drums
- Eric C. Wetzel - keyboards, vocals
- Jimmy Clark - drums
- Deron Lee (Loevenguth) - guitar
