= ILoo =

Cancelled portable toilet project by Microsoft

External media

Images
- Internet Toilet Roll Browser
- iToilet Spoof

Audio
- Microsoft Launches Internet-Equipped Portable Potty, NPR

The iLoo as depicted by MSN UK and distributed by news providers

The iLoo (short for Internet loo) was a cancelled Microsoft project to develop a Wi-Fi Internet-enabled portable toilet. The iLoo, which was to debut at British summer festivals, was described as being a portable toilet with wireless broadband Internet, an adjustable plasma screen, a membrane wireless keyboard, a six-channel speaker system, and toilet paper embossed with popular web site addresses. The iLoo was also to have an extra screen and keyboard on the outside, and was to be guarded. It was intended as the next in a series of successful initiatives by MSN UK which sought to introduce the internet in unusual locations, including MSN Street, MSN Park Bench and MSN Deckchair.

The project was announced by MSN UK on April 30, 2003, and was widely ridiculed before being declared a hoax by Microsoft on May 12. On May 13, another Microsoft press release stated that although the project had not been a hoax, it had been cancelled because it would do little to promote the MSN brand. There has since been speculation as to whether the project was cancelled for fear of being sued by Andrew Cubitt, who had invented the similarly named product "i-Loo". The iLoo was described as a public relations "debacle" by Online Journalism Review.

Comparable to the iLoo, the Chaos Computer Club's so-called "Datenklo" (German, in English "data loo") uses mobile toilet stalls as network distribution centers at Chaos Communication Camps. However, the use as a toilet is not intended.

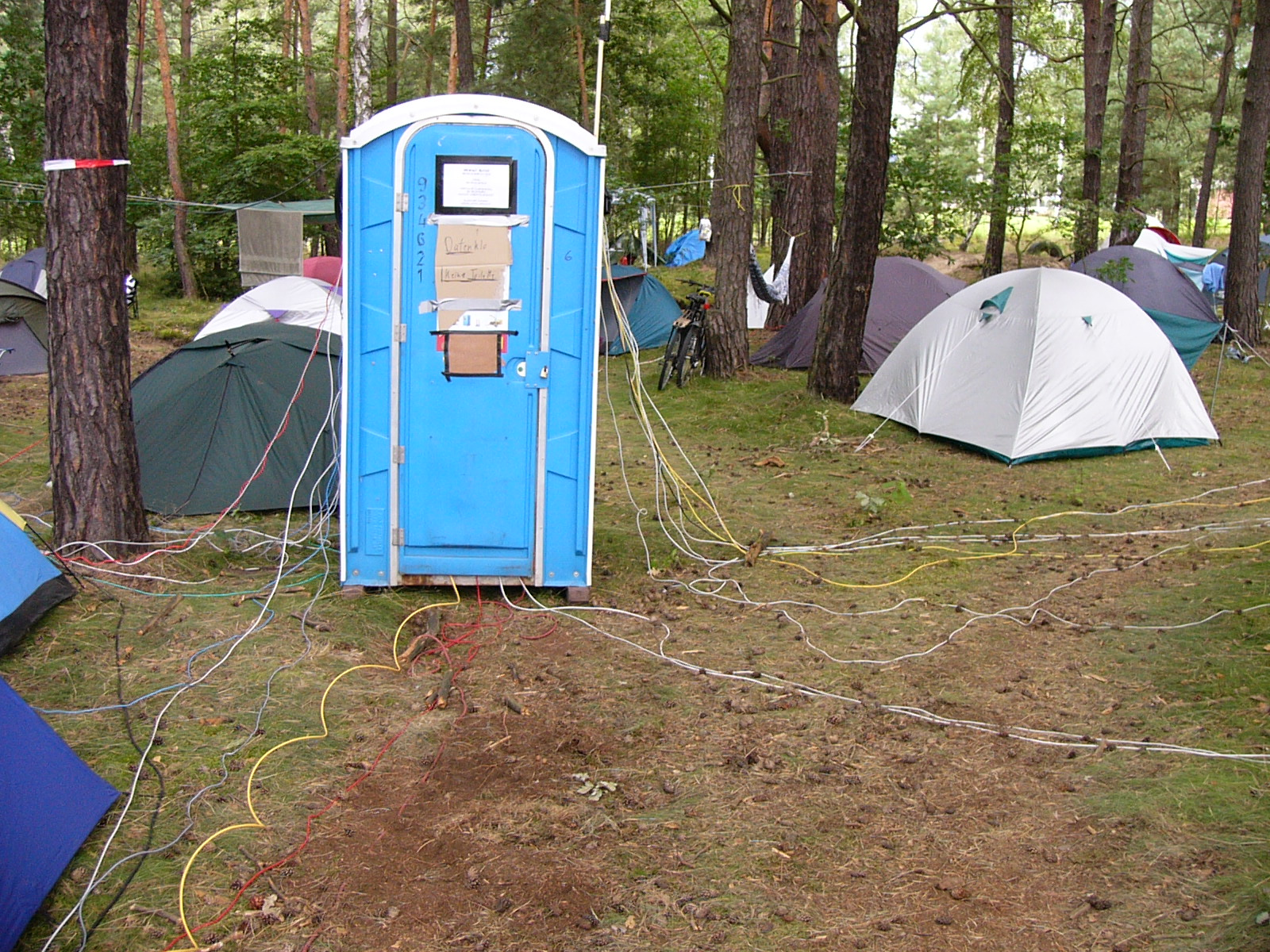
Tents and a "Datenklo" (German, in English "data loo") at the Chaos Communication Camp, Finowfurt 2007

== Description ==
The iLoo was supposedly designed to be a Wi-Fi Internet-enabled portable toilet that would allow users to surf the internet while using the loo. Internally, the facility would have a broadband connection via wireless 802.11b, a wireless waterproof keyboard, a swivel plasma screen running Windows XP Professional, a 6-channel surround-sound system beneath the sink, toilet paper embossed with popular URLs, and a suction toilet. Externally, the facility would feature an MSN logo and have a "Hotmail station" with an additional plasma screen and keyboard for waiting consumers. A security guard was to be stationed near the unit to ensure that it was being properly used and to prevent the unit from being stolen. The iLoo was to debut "at a majority of the summer season festivals". The iLoo was to be deployed only in Britain.

== Public relations timeline ==
The internet's so much a part of everyday life now that surfing on the loo was the next natural step. People used to reach for a book or mag when they were on the loo but now they'll be logging on! It's exciting to think that the smallest room can now be the gateway to the massive virtual world.
—Tracy Blacher, Marketing manager of MSN in April 30 Press Release

The project was announced on April 30, 2003 in press release by MSN UK, MSN's British subsidiary, as part of a "series of MSN.co.uk initiatives which look at the changing nature of how we use the web as it constantly evolves". The press release stated that:

The UK's most popular website msn.co.uk is creating the world's first 'Internet Loo'. The iLoo will be mobile and is part of MSN's mission to allow instant logging on 'anytime and any place'. In time for the summer festival season, MSN is in the process of converting a portable loo to create a unique experience for surfers looking for an alternative to the bog-standard festival loo experience. Users will be able to sit down, undock a wireless keyboard and conveniently access the first ever WWW.C.

The press release also stated that "MSN is also in talks with toilet paper manufacturers to produce special web paper for those in need of URL inspiration".

MSN is really working on building a prototype for the Summer festivals, perhaps Glastonbury ... This is very much a 'toe in the water' experiment to gauge interest so we'll have to see how it goes, although judging from response so far it's really captured people's imagination!
—Ben Philipson, Red Consultancy, in response to AP query

News of the iLoo was widely circulated amongst mainstream media. (Note: The iLoo was covered by the Associated Press, BBC, CNET, Herald Sun, Reuters, San Francisco Chronicle, Seattle Post-Intelligencer, Seattle Times, The Guardian, USA Today, Wall Street Journal, and a number of other news providers. See references and further reading for more examples of coverage.) The story became the most-emailed story on Yahoo! News on May 1, 2003, being emailed over 4000 times. (Note: This is based on "Most Popular News on Yahoo! News". Archived from the original on 2005-05-26. now "Most Popular News Headlines - Yahoo! News". Archived from the original on 2015-06-14. which is a service provided by Yahoo! to track the most popular stories.) The iLoo was widely derided and press coverage subjected MSN and Microsoft to heavy criticism. On May 10, The Inquirer published a story in which Andrew Cubitt alleged that "Microsoft stole his iLoo idea" from his i-Loo invention. On May 12, Microsoft announced that the iLoo was a "hoax perpetrated by its British division" calling it an "April Fool's joke" and issued an apology for the confusion. The Associated Press, however, stated that they had previously received confirmation of the project from two of Microsoft's PR firms: Waggener Edstrom Worldwide and Red Consultancy. The Seattle Post-Intelligencer also stated that it received confirmation from Waggener Edstrom and was even provided with a schematic drawing. Furthermore, April Fools was almost a month before, and Microsoft had never before released a fake press release.

On May 13, 2003, Microsoft retracted the denial, stating that the iLoo had been a legitimate demonstration project that was to be released in Britain for summer music festivals, but had been terminated by Microsoft executives in Redmond, Washington who believed the iLoo was inappropriate with the final decision made by MSN senior vice president David Cole. MSN product manager Lisa Gurry stated that the project "didn't really map to our global branding objectives". Microsoft again apologized for the miscommunication stating "the confusion over the legitimacy of this effort was caused by people moving too quickly and who misspoke before gathering all of the relevant information". Prior to the cancellation, an iLoo prototype was in the "early stages of construction". MSN allows regional units to design their own marketing campaigns, and the UK division had developed a reputation for innovative campaigns, in this case involving British toilet humour. The iLoo which was designed for the UK as part of a "tongue-in-cheek marketing initiative" was "intended to be the next in line of a number of clever initiatives in the UK involving introducing the internet in interesting locations, including MSN Street, MSN Park Bench and MSN Deckchair". The previous initiatives were well received. Microsoft stated that no employees were disciplined as a result of the debacle, although the company stated that it would conduct "internal discussions".

== Reaction ==
Reading in the loo, or the bog, is a traditional English pastime. We've all seen the magazine racks, loo paper with jokes and cartoons on the walls in toilets up and down the land. You've got to hand it to the creative—and uniquely English—minds at Microsoft.
—Jeremy Davies, market researcher from Context

Although the product was not publicly released, many questioned whether "Microsoft had lost its senses" and the product was widely derided. Critics contended that the product was a waste of money and doomed to fail. Concerns were raised about how the iLoo would serve to extend waiting lines, how hygienic it would be to share keyboards in a public loo, and what would happen if the keyboard were to be urinated upon. Critics also questioned whether users would spend enough time in the loo to make use of the internet facilities, noting that "most port-a-potty users stay only long enough to relieve themselves without having to inhale."

The iLoo, given its toiletry-related nature, subjected MSN and Microsoft to puns and jokes especially since Microsoft's marketing slogan at the time was "where do you want to go today?" with the PC being dubbed Pee-C. The Herald Sun wrote that the "iLoo is, unquestionably, very good news – mainly to journalists with a bottomless pit of laboured bum jokes" while the Seattle Times wrote "now the company has a credibility problem as well as a red face." Other newspapers issued humorous headlines: Microsoft technology headed for toilet from the San Francisco Chronicle, Toilet mixes zeroes with ones and twos from the Washington Post, and Microsoft's Gone Potty from The Daily Mirror.

The product has since been studied as an example of a public relations disaster and an example of an internet hoax. Microsoft's public relations response to the debacle is also considered to be one of the poorest in the company's history, given Microsoft's reputation for micro-managing news releases, interviews and promotional events.

The iLoo's negative publicity drowned out the launch of MSN Radio Plus on May 12, 2003. It has since inspired a number of spoofs.

== i-Loo controversy ==
After reading an article about the iLoo, Andrew Cubitt, inventor of the similarly named i-Loo, wrote to The Inquirer stating that iLoo "sounds remarkably similar ... it now seems that the clever people at Microsoft have cottoned onto the idea and even call it the i-Loo, the same as mine!" Cubitt went on to say that "mine did everything that the Microsoft one is meant to do, but additionally printed information on toilet paper and didn't use a keyboard for the interface due to hygiene reasons". The i-Loo was prototyped by Cubitt as part of his thesis for his 2001 university degree in Product Design and Engineering at Brunel University. In an interview with The Inquirer, he noted "As it was designed at the university, they own the partial rights to the product so they will be watching the Microsoft 'invention' very closely."

Microsoft never formally commented on Cubitt's allegations and instead initially stated the iLoo was an April's fool joke. As a result, Cubitt questioned whether this was "a very calculated ploy to destroy competition in its early stages, or is admitting they don't even know what time of the month it is less embarrassing and ridding them of a potentially expensive situation!" Cubitt went on to state that "as they have now discredited my idea as a joke, I will never be able to produce the idea" and as such was "consulting my law books now on defamatory statements". Neither Cubitt, nor Brunel University have taken public legal action against Microsoft pertaining to the i-Loo.

The i-Loo was described as:

The i-Loo internet toilet roll browser is a novel and unique product designed to make best use of the time you spend on the loo! The product allows you to search the internet whilst sitting on the toilet and print out any web pages you are interested in on your toilet paper. i-Loo brings a whole new meaning to the word downloading. The unit is fixed in front of a toilet on the cubical [sic] wall. The product provides up to date information about new products, daily news and lottery results through an easy to navigate software package. Normal operation of the toilet and paper dispenser is evident.

The i-Loo internet toilet roll browser was featured at the 2003 Daily Mail Ideal Home Show as part of the Future Concepts exhibition in Earls Court, London, where it was nominated for the MFI Bright Sparks 2003 awards. The i-Loo, which was sponsored by Epson Printers, received significant press coverage, and was featured on GMTV as well as various radio shows.

== See also ==
- TiSP
- Charmin V.I.Pee porta potty, unveiled at the 2020 Consumer Electronics Show featuring an Oculus Rift virtual reality headset
