= My God =

My God may refer to:

- My God (album), an album by Flotsam and Jetsam, or the titular song
- "Ratziti Sheteda" (often called "My God" in English), an Israeli song composed by Uzi Hitman
- "My God", a song by Jethro Tull from Aqualung, 1971
- "My God", a song by Alice Cooper from Lace and Whiskey, 1977
- "My God", a song by Audio Adrenaline from Audio Adrenaline, 1992
- "My God", a song by Pennywise from Land of the Free?, 2001
- "My God", a song by Gemma Hayes from Night on My Side, 2002
- "My God", a song by Hillsong London from Shout God's Fame, 2004
- "My God", a song by Joss Stone from the Japanese edition of Introducing Joss Stone, 2007
- "My God", a song by Natalie Imbruglia from Come to Life, 2009
- "My God", a song by Pusha T from Fear of God and Fear of God II: Let Us Pray, 2011
- "My God", a song by Jeremy Camp from Reckless, 2013
- "My God", a song by the Killers (featuring Weyes Blood) from Imploding the Mirage, 2020
- My God (film), a 2015 Malayalam-language film

== See also ==
- Oh My God (disambiguation)
- God (disambiguation)
