= Internet outdial =

Type of modem

An Internet outdial is an Internet-accessible modem that can be dialed remotely. An Internet outdial that permits long-distance calling is called a global outdial (GOD).

During the 1990s, outdials were a way to connect to distant bulletin board systems without incurring per-minute charges from one's long-distance carrier. For a time, the online zine Phrack maintained a list of Internet outdials, many of which were hosted by universities.
