= The Godz (album) =

Studio album by The Godz
- Released: 1978
- Genre: Hard rock, heavy metal
- Length: 40:04
- Label: Millennium Records (USA); Polydor Records (Europe)
- Producer: Don Brewer

The Godz chronology
The Godz (1978)	Nothing Is Sacred (1979)

Professional ratings
Review scores
Source	Rating
Allmusic	link
Christgau's Record Guide	C+

The Godz is the self-titled debut album by American hard rock band The Godz (from Columbus, Ohio), released in 1978. It contains their most notable radio hit, "Gotta Keep a Running".

The album was reissued and remastered on CD by UK-based company Rock Candy Records.

== Track listing ==
1. "Go Away" – 4:29 (Eric Moore)
2. "Baby I Love You" – 4:17 (Eric Moore)
3. "Guaranteed" – 3:33 (Glen Cataline)
4. "Gotta Keep a Running" – 7:27 (Eric Moore)
5. "Under the Table" – 3:43 (Mark Chatfield)
6. "Cross Country" – 7:03 (Mark Chatfield/Glen Cataline)
7. "Candy's Going Bad" - 10:38 (George Kooymans/Barry Hay)

== Credits ==
- Bob Hill - guitar, keyboard, vocals
- Mark Chatfield – guitar, vocals
- Eric Moore – bass, vocals
- Glen Cataline – drums, vocals

== Production ==
- Producer: Don Brewer
- Engineer: Mark Stebbeds

Recorded at the swamp, Flint Michigan, remixed at sound suite Studios, Detroit, Michigan mastered by Greg Calbi Sterling sound N.Y.C.

== Notes ==
- The band wanted to name the album Rock & Roll Machine, but later learned of the name already having been used by the Canadian hard rock band Triumph on their second album released in 1977.
- "Candy's Going Bad" is a cover song of Dutch rock band Golden Earring from their album Moontan (1973).
- Producer Don Brewer is best known to rock and roll fans for being the drummer in Grand Funk Railroad.
