= Dear God =

Dear God may refer to:

== Songs ==
- "Dear God" (Patsy Cline song), 1958
- "Dear God" (Elton John song), 1980
- "Dear God" (XTC song), 1986
- "Dear God" (Midge Ure song) 1988
- "Dear God" (Avenged Sevenfold song), 2008
- "Dear God" (Cory Asbury song), 2020
- "Dear God", by Boyz II Men from Evolution
- "Dear God", by Chris Brown from Indigo, 2019
- "Dear God", by Dax from his 2020 EP I'll Say It For You
- "Dear God", by Hunter Hayes from Wild Blue (Part I), 2019
- "Dear God", by Nick Jonas from Nicholas Jonas
- "Dear God", a song by Nessa Barrett
- "Dear God", by Tate McRae from So Close to What

== Other uses ==
- Dear God (film), a 1996 American comedy directed by Garry Marshall
- Dear God (album), an album by the Pretty Reckless
- "Dear God" (Touched by an Angel), an episode of the TV series Touched by an Angel
- Dear G-d..., a 2014 album by Being as an Ocean
