= Oh My Goddess (disambiguation) =

Oh My Goddess may refer to:

- Oh My Goddess!, a manga series, original video animations, film, and TV series
  - Ah! My Goddess: The Movie, a 2000 animated film based on the manga
- "Oh My Goddess", an episode of Charmed (season 5)

== See also ==
- Goddess (disambiguation)
- Oh My God (disambiguation)
- OMG (disambiguation)
