= Jdbgmgr.exe virus hoax =

Hoax aimed at Microsoft Windows users

The jdbgmgr.exe virus hoax involved an e-mail spam in 2002 that advised computer users to delete a file named jdbgmgr.exe because it was a computer virus. jdbgmgr.exe, which had a little teddy bear-like icon (The Microsoft Bear), was actually a valid Microsoft Windows file, the Debugger Registrar for Java (also known as Java Debug Manager, hence jdbgmgr).

The email has taken many forms, including saying its purpose was to warn Hotmail users of a virus spreading via MSN Messenger, or to alert about a possible virus in the orkut web community. The message went on to say that it was not detected by McAfee or Norton AntiVirus, which was obviously true. A further variant related the file with the "Bugbear" virus, which was a genuine virus, prevalent at the time.

The effect of deleting the file was restricted to Java developers who used Microsoft Visual J++ v1.1. It had little to no effect on most users because it was simply a developer tool.

== Microsoft Bear ==
The icon for jdbgmgr.exe, Microsoft Bear, was the mascot for the Microsoft Windows 3.1 development team, alongside 16-bit Bunny and 32-bit Bunny, which represented the transition to 32-bit computing with the release of Windows 95.

The unusual icon was similar to that of some viruses at the time, such as Parrot, making the virus hoax more believable.

Microsoft Bear was featured in several easter eggs within Windows 3.1, including a hidden credits screen where the email addresses of the developers could be found. In 2002, Microsoft stopped including these easter eggs in their software as part of the Trustworthy Computing Initiative, due to the risk of exploits and security flaws that could be introduced by these features which most users were unaware of.

== See also ==
- List of hoaxes
