= Oh. My. Gods. =

Book by Tera Lynn Childs

- US Cover
- Author: Tera Lynn Childs
- Language: English, German
- Genre: Fantasy, young adult novel
- Publisher: Penguin Group (U.S.)
- Publication date: May 1, 2008 (U.S.)
- Publication place: United States
- Media type: Print (Hardback & Paperback)
- Pages: 272
- ISBN: 0-525-47942-2
- LC Class: PZ7.C44185 Oh 2008
- Followed by: Goddess Boot Camp

Oh. My. Gods. is a 2008 young adult fantasy novel by Tera Lynn Childs. The book follows the character of Phoebe, a young runner who discovers that the school she's attending is full of family and relatives of Greek gods and goddesses. Oh. My. Gods. was the winner of Romance Writers of America's 2009 RITA award for "Best First Book".

== Plot summary ==
Phoebe is a perfectly happy senior at high school and headed for USC with her best friends after graduation. Everything changes when her mom comes back to California announcing she is marrying a Greek man and they have plans to move there. They move to a secret island where she is accepted to an exclusive academy for the descendants of Greek gods, which is run by Phoebe's new stepfather. Phoebe doesn't fit in, partly because she believes she's not of divine descent and the fact her new step-sister and others torment her, which Phoebe ignores. At the school, she quickly befriends Nicole and Troy, making it onto her cross country team, due to her talent in running. Soon after, she gets swept up into troubles involving her, Griffin, Nicole, Troy, Stella, and her dead dad. At the very end of the book, Phoebe finds out the biggest secret of her life: Phoebe is a descendant of Nike, the Goddess of Victory. She then proceeds to talk to Griffin, who tells her he was destined to be with a descendant of Nike, and they start a relationship.

=== Characters ===
- Phoebe Castro, the main character in the book. Her mom gets married, and she has to move to Serfopoula, causing her world to be turned upside down. She has trouble adjusting to her new life.
- Nicole Matios, one of Phoebe's three friends. Nicole isn't afraid of anything, and is haunted by a mistake she and Griffin made a decade before.
- Troy Travatas, a friend of Phoebe. He is a descendant of Asclepius, but wants to be a musician.
- Griffin Blake, a boy from Phoebe's school that she likes. He is a descendant from Ares and Hercules from his father's side. He is Hercules's last descendant
- Valerie Petrolas, a therapist and Phoebe's mom. Her relationship with Phoebe went downhill after they moved out to Serfopoula.
- Stella Petrolas, Phoebe's stepsister, who tries to make Phoebe's life miserable. Stella is part of the mean and popular clique at school. She is a descendant of Hera.
- Damian Petrolas, Phoebe's stepfather, marrying Phoebe's mother near the beginning of the book and Stella's biological father. He is also the headmaster of the school that Phoebe and Stella attend.

== Reception ==
Reception for Oh. My. Gods. was positive, with the School Library Journal stating that the book "will keep teens, particularly girls, reading to find out if Phoebe will finally fit in, get her crush, and make the team." Publishers Weekly called the book's plot "a fun, fresh update" on a familiar theme.
