= SULFNBK.EXE =

Early 2000s e-mail hoax

SULFNBK.EXE (short for Setup Utility for Long File Name Backup) is an internal component of the Microsoft Windows operating system (in Windows 98 and Windows ME) for restoring long file names.

== Email hoax ==
The component became famous in the early 2000s as the subject of an e-mail hoax. The hoax claimed that SULFNBK.EXE was a virus, and contained instructions to locate and delete the file. While the instructions worked, they were needless and (in some rare cases, for example, when the long file names are damaged and need to be restored) can cause disruptions, as SULFNBK.EXE is not a virus, but instead an operating system component.

Even people who didn't receive the e-mail were still perplexed if they found the file by themselves (because of its quickly hand-drawn icon), thinking that it could be a virus or trojan horse.

In Windows 98 and ME, where the file existed, SULFNBK.EXE can be found in Windows "COMMAND" directory (a directory that contains command line tools, usually C:\WINDOWS\COMMAND\).

== See also ==
- jdbgmgr.exe virus hoax
