= Windows Master Control Panel shortcut =

Windows shortcut

The Windows Master Control Panel shortcut, labeled All Tasks in the Windows Registry and by at least one Microsoft developer, and also often informally called Windows God Mode, is a shortcut to access various control settings in Windows Vista and later operating systems, including Windows 10 and Windows 11. By creating a folder with a certain name, users have access to all the operating system's control panels from within a single folder. The existence was widely published outside of Microsoft documentation in 2007 and gained popularity when the name "God Mode" was coined. Variations of the same method can access different options, and have also been described as "God Mode" folders.

== Implementation ==
The functionality, All Tasks, that was discovered and nicknamed Master Control Panel or God Mode was designed as the base folder for searching control panel options using the new start menu's search function. This allows users to type what they want to do (e.g. "Change screen resolution") and they will get the right control panel options as search result. The shortcut is implemented by creating a folder with the extension .{ED7BA470-8E54-465E-825C-99712043E01C}. "GodMode" was simply the folder name used when the feature was popularized, but any name may be used. The same functionality can be achieved by creating a standard Windows shortcut with the path explorer.exe shell:::{ED7BA470-8E54-465E-825C-99712043E01C} or by creating a Desktop.ini file in a folder that includes the extension's CLSID (Class ID). On Windows 10 or Windows 11 after creating the shortcut, its name will disappear.

== Discovery ==
The general method of creating the shortcuts is documented by Microsoft, though Microsoft had not publicized the specific GUID ED7BA470-8E54-465E-825C-99712043E01C for the Master Control Panel. Third parties have published the method since at least 2007 under titles such as "[Registry Hack] VISTA - All Control Panel & Setting tasks at one place". Numerous blogs and tweets on the subject appeared in December 2009, as well as January 2010, referring to it as "Windows 7 Godmode", with many sites repeating the same information available elsewhere.

== Related shortcuts ==
The general folder shortcut format is <FolderDisplayName>.{<GUID>} where <GUID> is a valid Class ID (CLSID) with a System.ApplicationName entry in the Windows Registry. The technique is documented by Microsoft as “Using File System Folders as Junction Points”. The CLSID {ED7BA470-8E54-465E-825C-99712043E01C} is of particular interest because the associated widget allows access to many Windows settings. Microsoft documents the GUIDs for the regular Control Panel applets on MSDN. A CNET article attributed many of the GUID shortcuts to the head of Microsoft's Windows division, Steven Sinofsky.

== Known issues ==
=== Java ===
Pre-Java 8 applications using Swing's Windows look-and-feel, including those compiled by Excelsior JET, are known to crash on Windows 10 Creators Update when a God Folder exists. A workaround may consists of putting the "God" folder inside another Folder. Putting "God" in a "virtual" folder directly, such as desktop or documents causes the problem for older .jar programs

=== Windows 10 ===
In Windows 10 1703 (April 2017), Microsoft broke the display of a "God Mode" folder in File Explorer. The problem remains in the subsequent versions. A workaround was proposed, but it does not always work.

== See also ==
- Microsoft Windows
