= Oh My God =

Oh My God, or variants, may refer to:

== Film ==
- Oh! My God, a 1998 film starring Bowie Lam
- Oh! My God (2006 film), a South Korean film
- Oh, My God, a Hindi film of 2008
- Oh My God (2009 film), an American documentary film about religion
- OMG – Oh My God!, a 2012 Indian Hindi film
- Oh My God (2013 film), a Louis C.K. comedy special
- Oh My God (2015 film), a Chinese romantic comedy film

== Music ==
- Oh My God (band), an American indie rock band

=== Albums ===
- Oh, My God! (Doug E. Fresh album), 1986
- Oh, My God! (Linda Sundblad album), 2006
- Oh My God (Kevin Morby album), 2019

=== Songs ===
- "Oh My God" ((G)I-dle song), 2020
- "Oh My God" (Guns N' Roses song), 1999
- "Oh My God" (Ida Maria song), 2007
- "Oh My God" (Kaiser Chiefs song), 2004; covered by Mark Ronson with Lily Allen (2007)
- "Oh My God!" (The Moniker song), 2011
- "Oh My God" (A Tribe Called Quest song), 1994
- "Oh My God" (Adele song), 2021
- "Oh My God", by David Crowder Band from Give Us Rest, 2012
- "Oh My God", by Jars of Clay from Good Monsters, 2006
- "Oh My God", by Jay Z from Kingdom Come, 2006
- "Oh My God", by Michael Franti & Spearhead from Stay Human, 2001
- "Oh My God!", by NMB48 from Teppen Tottande!, 2013
- "Oh My God", by Pink from Try This, 2003
- "Oh My God", by St. Vincent from Actor, 2009
- "O My God", by the Police from Synchronicity, 1983

== Other uses ==
- Oh My God!, a 1993 arcade puzzle game by Atlus
- Oh My Gods!, a 2002 webcomic by Shivian Montar Balaris
- Oh. My. Gods., a 2008 novel by Tera Lynn Childs

== See also ==
- Oh-My-God particle, a particular case of an ultra-high-energy cosmic ray
- Act of Contrition, a Christian prayer genre that expresses sorrow for sins
- Oh My Gawd!!!, a 1987 album by The Flaming Lips
- "Oh My Goodness", a 2011 song by Olly Murs
- Oh My Goddess (disambiguation)
- OMG (disambiguation)
- Oh My (disambiguation)
- My God (disambiguation)
- Oh my gosh (disambiguation)
