= Satanic =

Satanic may refer to:

- Satan
- Satanism
- Satanic (2006 film), a 2006 American horror film
- Satanic (2016 film), a 2016 American horror film
- Operation Satanic, when the DGSE bombed the Rainbow Warrior in Auckland Harbour
- Satanik, an Italian comics character from Editoriale Corno
- Satanik (Killing), an Italian comics character from Ponzoni Editore

== See also ==
- Satan (disambiguation)
- Satanic panic (disambiguation)
- Satanic Verses (disambiguation)
- Satanism (disambiguation)
- Satanist (disambiguation)
