= Shaitan (disambiguation) =

Shaitan is the leader of the devils (shayāṭīn) in Islam

Shaitan or variants may also refer to:

== Film and television ==
- Shaitaan (1974 film), an Indian film
- Sheitan (film), a 2006 French film
- Shaitan (film), a 2011 Indian film
- Saithan, a 2016 Indian film
- Shaitan (TV series), a 2023 Indian TV series
- Shaitaan (2024 film), an Indian film

== People ==
Shaitan Singh, Indian military officer and Param Vir Chakra recipient (1924–1962)

== Other uses ==
- Shaitan elchini, a genus of spiders
- Shai'tan, a concept/character in The Wheel of Time
- Gerd Sheytan, a village in Iran

== See also ==
- Satan (disambiguation)
- Shaytan (disambiguation)
- Shaitaan Haveli, 2018 Indian TV series
- Shatian (disambiguation)
- Shayatin, a class of evil spirits in Islam
