= Shaidan =

Shaidan may refer to:

- Shaitan, Islamic Satan
- Asht or Shaidan, a town in Tajikistan

== See also ==
- Shahidan, Iran (disambiguation)
- Shaytan (disambiguation)
