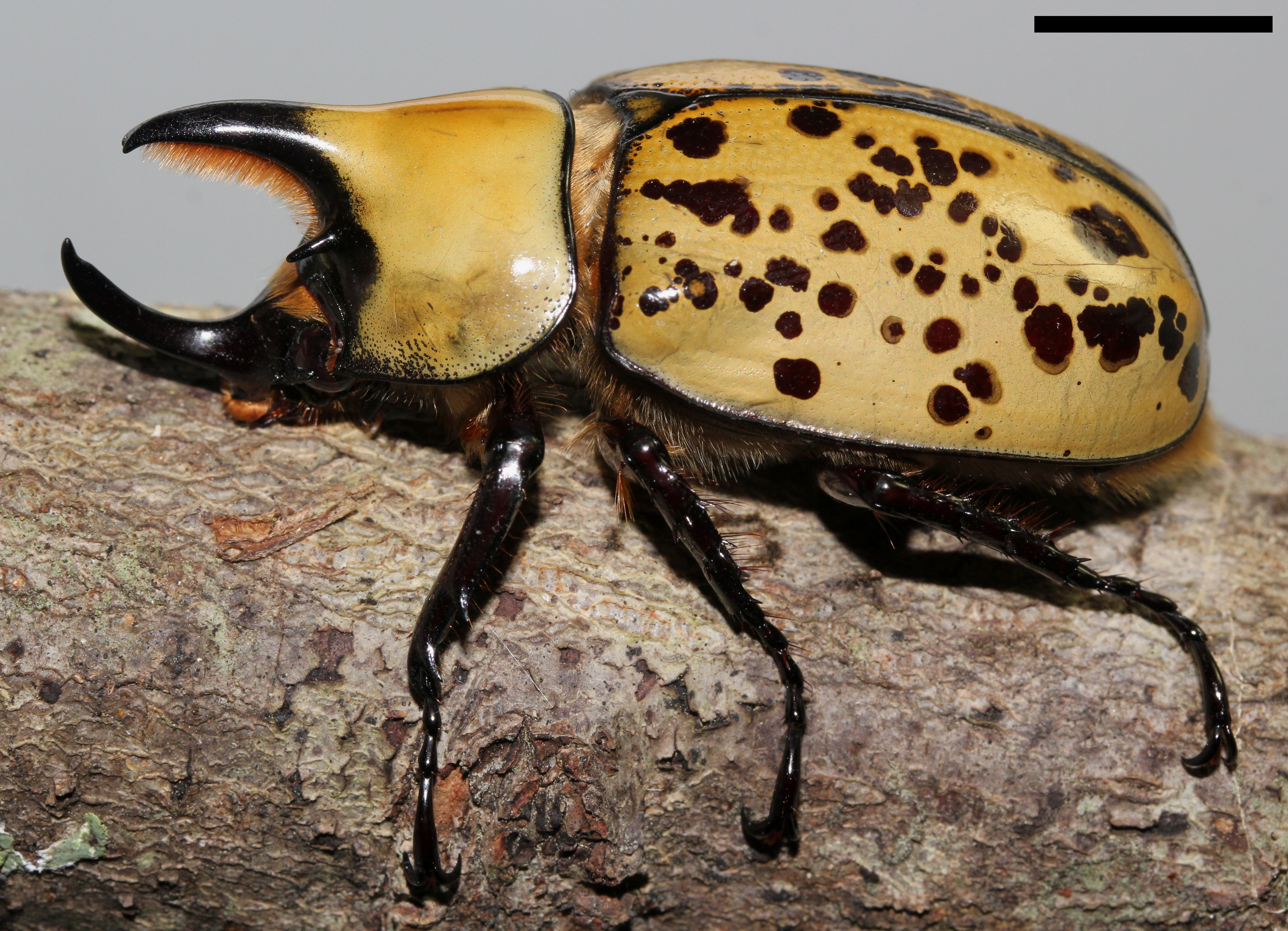
- Adult male
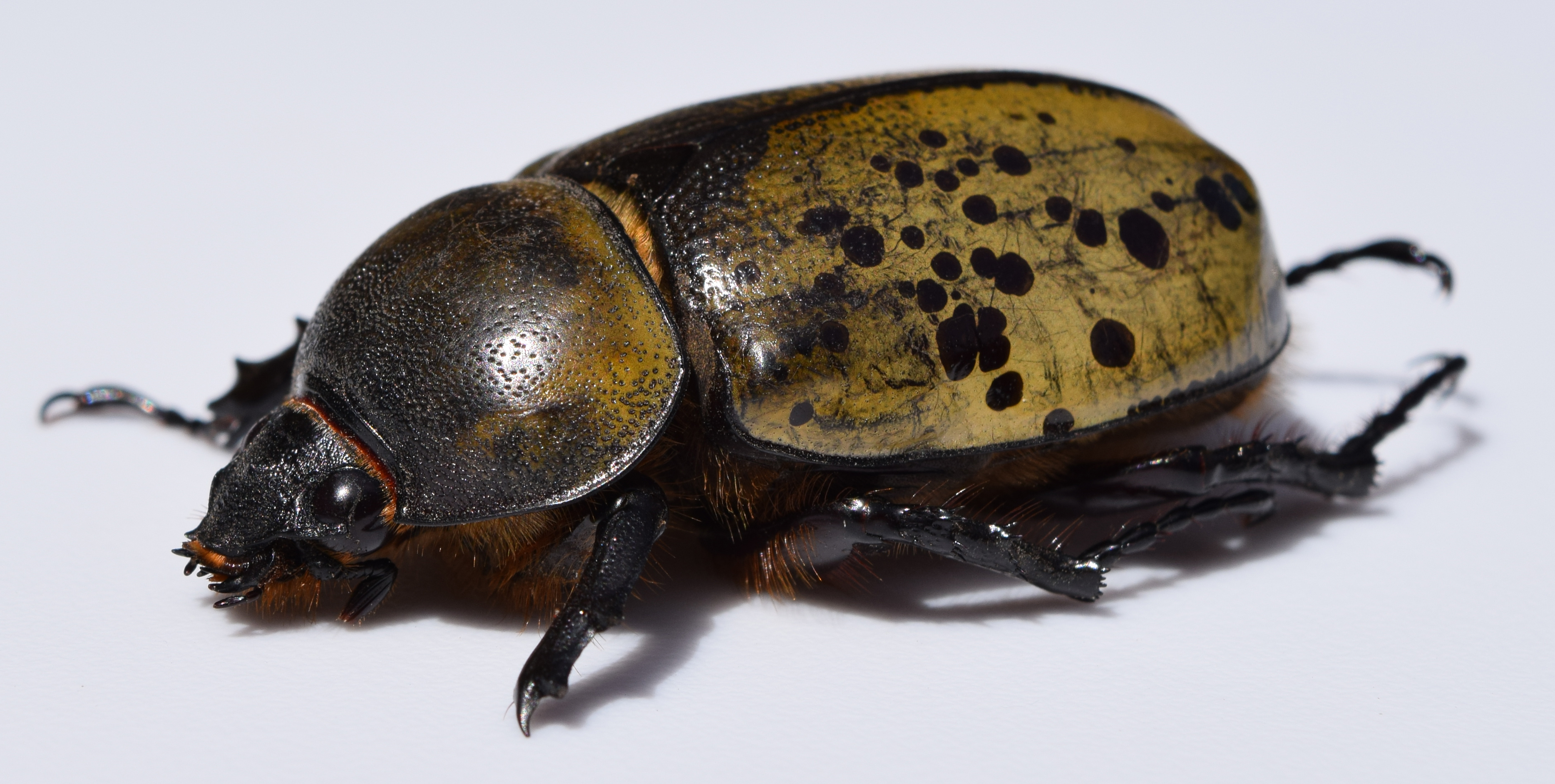
- Adult female

Scientific classification
- Kingdom: Animalia
- Phylum: Arthropoda
- Clade: Pancrustacea
- Class: Insecta
- Order: Coleoptera
- Suborder: Polyphaga
- Infraorder: Scarabaeiformia
- Family: Scarabaeidae
- Genus: Dynastes
- Species: D. tityus

Binomial name
- Dynastes tityus (Linnaeus, 1763)

Synonyms
- Scarabæus Tityus Linnaeus, 1763; Scarabaeus marianus Linnaeus, 1767; Scarabaeus pennsylvanicus De Geer, 1774; Dynastes corniger Sternberg, 1909; Dynastes tityrus Andrews, 1916 (Lapsus)

= Dynastes tityus =

Species of beetle

Dynastes tityus, the eastern Hercules beetle, is a species of rhinoceros beetle native to the Eastern United States. The adult's elytra are green, gray or tan, with black markings, and the whole animal, including the male's horns, may reach 60 mm (2.4 in) in length. The larvae feed on decaying wood from various trees.

== Taxonomy and names ==
Dynastes tityus is known by a number of common names, including eastern Hercules beetle, elephant beetle and ox beetle. It was first given a scientific name by Carl Linnaeus, in his 1763 work Centuria Insectorum, where it was called Scarabaeus tityus; when Linnaeus' genus Scarabaeus was divided into smaller genera, S. tityus was renamed Dynastes tityus.

== Description ==
Adults of both sexes are 20–27 millimeters (0.8–1.1 in) wide, and males are 40–60 millimeters (1.6–2.4 in) long, including a long horn (the pronotal horn) which projects forwards from the thorax of the male; a second horn (the clypeal horn) projects upwards from the head. Dynastes tityus is therefore "among the longest and heaviest beetles in the United States". The horns are used in battles between rival males competing for a mate; the size of the horn reflects the availability of food when the beetle was growing. Despite the size of the horns, Dynastes tityus are harmless to humans.

The elytra are green, gray, or tan, usually with black mottling. The pattern of spots is unique to each individual. Beetles that are found in the soil or in rotten wood often appear very dark, with the spots on the elytra obscured. This results from moisture which the shell has absorbed; when the elytra dry out, they return to their paler color. Moisture is stored on the outer layer of the elytra, called the epicuticle, which changes the angle at which light reflects off of the underlying layer, the exocuticle, which is composed of photonic crystals. Occasionally, both elytra may be a uniform mahogany color, or one elytron may be pale with dark blotches, while the other is a plain mahogany color.

Dynastes tityus was featured on a stamp issued by the United States Postal Service in October 1999.

=== Physiology ===
The external humidity level leads to the elytra color change for the eastern Hercules beetle. They change color from yellow-green to deep brown when they move from a low humidity environment to a high humidity environment. When the environment is dry, the space between the multilayers is filled up with air and the refractive index has a low value of 1. However, when the humidity increases, the air is replaced by water and the refractive index increases 1.33. The change in the level of refractive index alters the light transmission path, which eventually causes the visible color change.

The eastern Hercules beetle has a multilayer body structure in which the exact composition has not been determined. The known components of the insect cuticle are chitin fibers and a proteinaceous matrix. They fuse with each other and build an ordered structure which can store energy to protect the wing and body. When the elytra appears deep brown under the high humidity environment, it can better defend the beetle from attacks and accidents. Furthermore, the elytra is more apt to regular protection and attack when it has the yellow-green color.

== Distribution ==
The genus Dynastes is theorized to originate in South America. The North American lineage appeared after the closure of the Panama Isthmus 3.5 million years ago. This lineage has been further dispersed by the Transverse Volcanic Belt and the Sierra Madre del Sur into eastern and western species in North America. D. tityus lives in the eastern and southeastern United States, from New York state, Illinois and Indiana in the north to Florida and the Gulf of Mexico in the south, with eastern Texas and western Arkansas marking the western limit of its range.

The larvae of eastern Hercules beetles live in decaying wood. They prefer to reside and develop within the large cavity at or near the bases of the tree through which they can tunnel into the soil. The adults are observed to live in the vegetation and under moist leaf-litter. The fallen leaves and logs can protect the beetle from predation risks. They are also found to live on ash trees where the trees help them attract and locate mates.

== Life history ==
Mating can last up to 50 minutes in D. tityus. Subsequent batches of eggs are oviposited in the same site until its resources are exhausted. The larvae are large C-shaped grubs with white bodies and chewing mouthparts, which feed on decaying wood and litter within rotten trees and produce distinctive rectangular fecal pellets about 10 mm (0.39 in) long. After 12–18 months, the larvae pupate in late summer. Adults remain underground through the winter, initially remaining in their pupal cell. They emerge in the summer and live for 6–8 months. The adults' diet is not well known, but they have been observed lapping up the sap of ash trees.

Oviposition happens during the summer and females lay up to 100 eggs in large cavities at or near the bases of the tree. Mature oaks and hardwoods are preferred. Females may share the same site to lay the eggs if there are enough accumulations of woody debris as food resources. The eggs are generally laid within or very close to the decaying wood so that the larvae would have enough nutrients without traveling too far. Thus, female investment towards the eggs happens before laying. No further parental care behavior is reported.

The beetles undergo metamorphosis, which includes egg, larval, pupal and adult stages. Females lay the white-yellow eggs inside the soil during the summer. Eggs have an incubation period of about one month, followed by three larval instars, which refer to molting stages of the larvae. Larvae spend most of their time underground. The larvae are large C-shaped grubs with white bodies and chewing mouthparts, which feed on decaying wood and litter within rotten trees and produce distinctive rectangular fecal pellets about 10 mm (0.39 in) long, which functions has a house for them to develop during both larvae and pupae stages. Before turning into pupae, larvae spend six months to one year to grow and molt twice in the soil. The molting process accommodates more growth. The "teneral" state describes the soft-bodied state of the beetle right after molting where their body has a pale color. This process lasts for a few hours to wait for the cuticle to harden.

The larvae turn into pupae in the next late summer within the constructed larva’s fecal pellets and surrounding woody debris. Pupae turn into adults in about a month. They stay underground within their pupal cell through the winter and emerge in the next summer. The lifespan of adult beetles varies from 6 to 23 months. Individuals and mating pairs are commonly found to stay on the ash trees and scrape off the bark and feed on sap. The complete development may take up to three years in the wild. The larvae are saproxylophagous, meaning they feed on dead wood, such as rotten logs and decaying tree trunks.

=== Predation ===
Different predators attack different life stages of Dynastes tityus. The eggs are vulnerable to attack from a predatory mite. The grubs are eaten by mammals including skunks and raccoons, and soil-dwelling arthropods, including centipedes, ground beetles, spiders and the maggots of Mydas flies.

A tiny mite that burrows through the soils and feeds on the larvae. They are very similar in color to the eggs. The species has not been determined yet. Mydas fly larvae also feed on the eggs by burrowing through soil.

=== Mating ===
Males have been observed to release a pungent odor which is similar to blueberries. It is speculated that this scent is used to attract females. It has been shown that ash plays an important role in attracting and locating mates, which explains why adults live on ash instead of tree cavities. Males would scrape the bark and chew into the cambium of ash branches.

== Similar species ==
Dynastes species are restricted to the Americas and only two of the eight species occur in the United States. While D. tityus inhabits the eastern United States, Dynastes grantii (the western Hercules beetle) live at higher elevations in Arizona, New Mexico and Utah. Several species are found in Mexico with Dynastes hyllus found as far north as Tamaulipas. D. tityus and D. grantii are very similar, and it is possible to interbreed them and produce viable hybrids.

== Interaction with humans ==
D. tityus possess elytra that are light and strong, and the purpose of elytra is to protect the beetle’s hindwings. Their unique and beneficial elytra has inspired applications to the human world. The beetle’s elytra are made up of chitin fibers and a proteinaceous matrix. The elytra of D. tityus can be used as a biological blueprint for the development of light and strong materials. D. tityus can also change color from green to black based on environmental humidity. They change to black when the humidity increases.

Bio-inspired models from D. tityus include micro structures. From human structures, the materials used should be composite and fabricated in layers.Bonding between layers can be enforced by placing fibers in each layer and cross layer to obtain a bonding force.Another bio-inspired model is the varying hardness between layers. The hardness of bio-inspired materials should be different and the direction of the materials in the layers should also be different.
