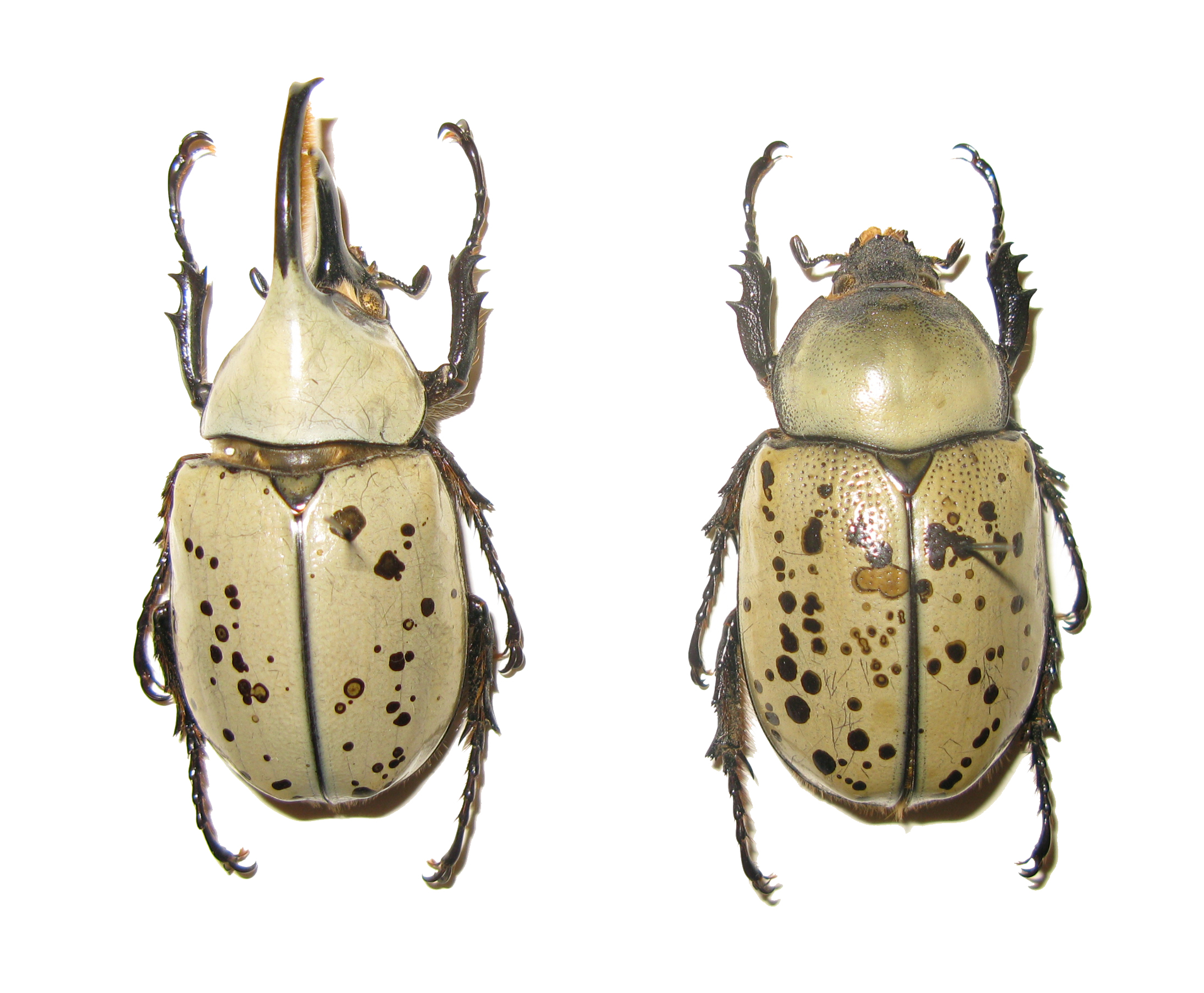

Scientific classification
- Kingdom: Animalia
- Phylum: Arthropoda
- Class: Insecta
- Order: Coleoptera
- Suborder: Polyphaga
- Infraorder: Scarabaeiformia
- Family: Scarabaeidae
- Genus: Dynastes
- Species: D. grantii

Binomial name
- Dynastes grantii Horn, 1870

= Dynastes grantii =

Western Hercules beetle

Species of beetle

The western Hercules beetle (Dynastes grantii, often misspelled as "granti") is a species of rhinoceros beetle that lives in Arizona, New Mexico and Utah in the United States and in parts of northern Mexico. This species is known for its grayish-white elytra, large size, and characteristic horn of the adult males.

== Description ==
Adult body sizes of both sexes vary from 3.5 to 6.0 cm (1.4–2.4 in) (apex of elytra to apex of thoracic horn), with captive-reared individuals reaching up to 8.0 cm (3.1 in) Coloration of the elytra varies from white to grayish-white, often with irregular black spots of various size and number. At high humidity levels, the elytra may appear black.

Dynastes grantii is sexually dimorphic, with the females lacking the characteristic horns of the male.

== Life cycle ==
Like other Hercules beetle species, Dynastes grantii undergoes a six-stage life cycle from egg to adult, with three larval instars and a single pupal stage. The time from egg to pupal eclosion is estimated to take approximately two years. The pupal stage lasts about 30 days. Adults emerge from the pupal chamber between the months of August through October and typically live between two and four months in the wild. In captivity, the adults may live up to nine months. After mating the female oviposits over 100 eggs.

== Distribution and habitat ==
Populations of Dynastes grantii may be found in southern Utah, Arizona, western New Mexico of the United States, and parts of Northern Mexico. This species typically inhabits highland forest habitats, at or above 1,600 m (5,200 ft) above sea level.

== Feeding habits ==
Adults have been documented feeding on the cambium of ash trees. The beetles strip the bark from small branches and feed on the sap produced by the exposed cambium.

== Similar species ==
Dynastes grantii belongs to the White Hercules beetle lineage which includes five allopatrically distributed North American and Central American taxa, including Dynastes hyllus, Dynastes maya, Dynastes moroni, and Dynastes tityus. Despite differences in geographic origin and morphology, namely horn length and coloration of the elytra, Dynastes tityus and Dynastes grantii are very similar and it is possible for the two species to produce hybrids. Some scientists believe that the two beetles are actually subspecies given the similarities of the male genitalia.

Dynastes grantii is very similar morphologically to Dynastes hyllus, with differentiation between species often only possible through examination of geographic origin.

=== Distinction from D. hyllus ===
The body coloration of Dynastes hyllus is typically yellowish to brownish where it is white to grayish-white in Dynastes grantii. The significant protrusion forward of the bottom tooth at the base of the thoracic horn in males of Dynastes hyllus is also a distinguishing factor between the two species. While Dynastes hyllus can be distinguished morphologically from Dynastes grantii, geographic origin is generally the strongest factor in correct identification.

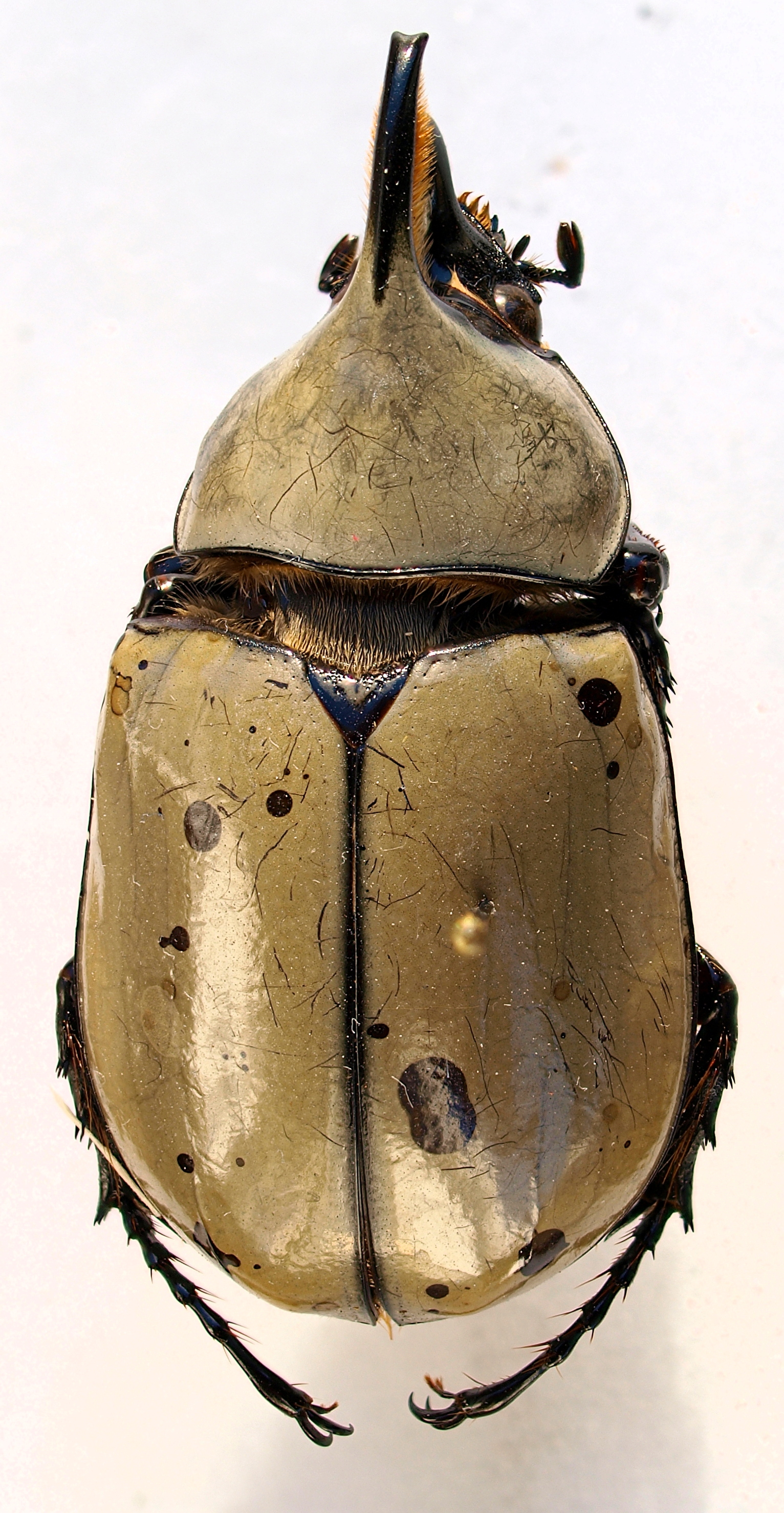
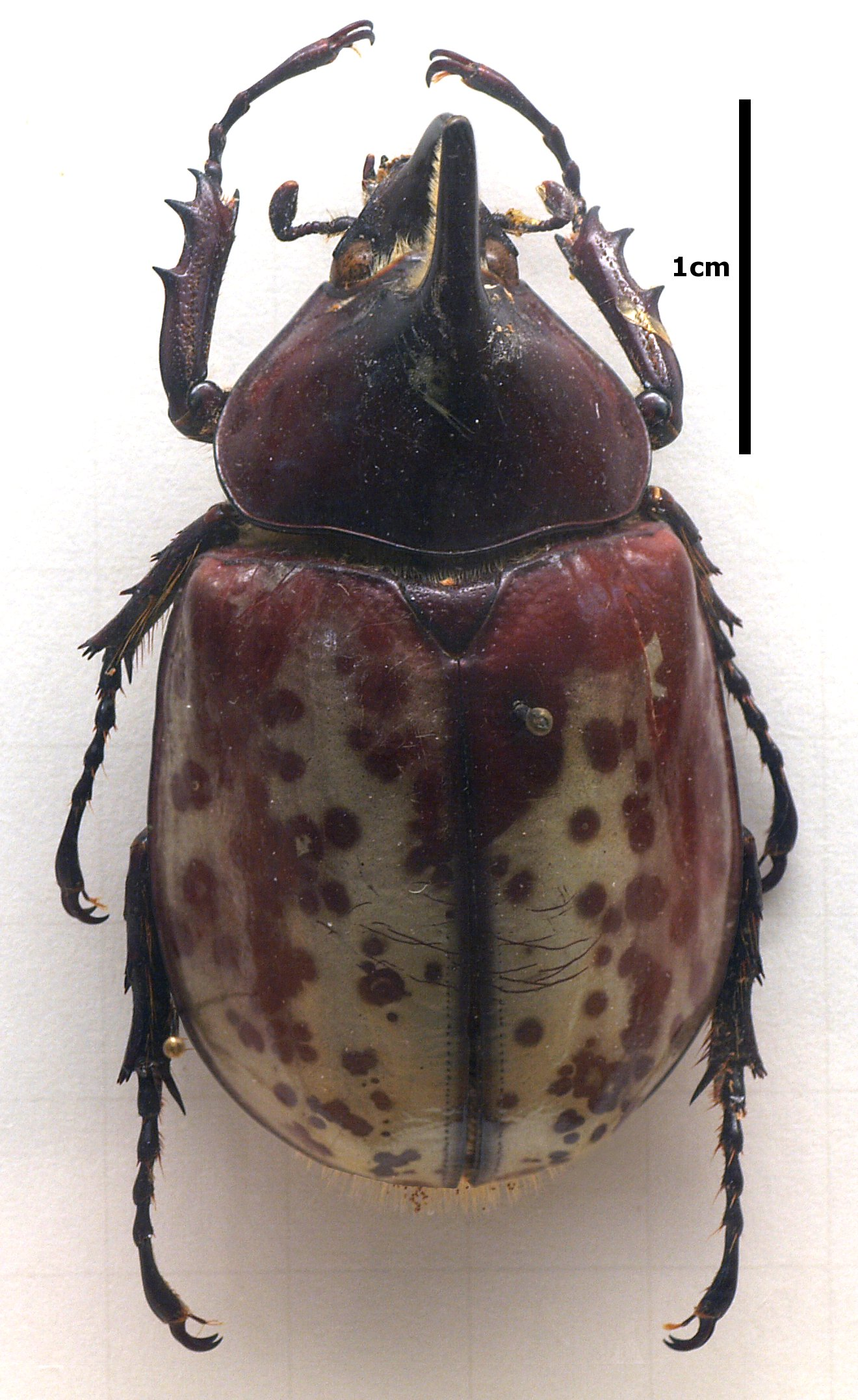

A comparison between a male Dynastes grantii (left) and a male Dynastes hyllus (right)

== Additional images ==
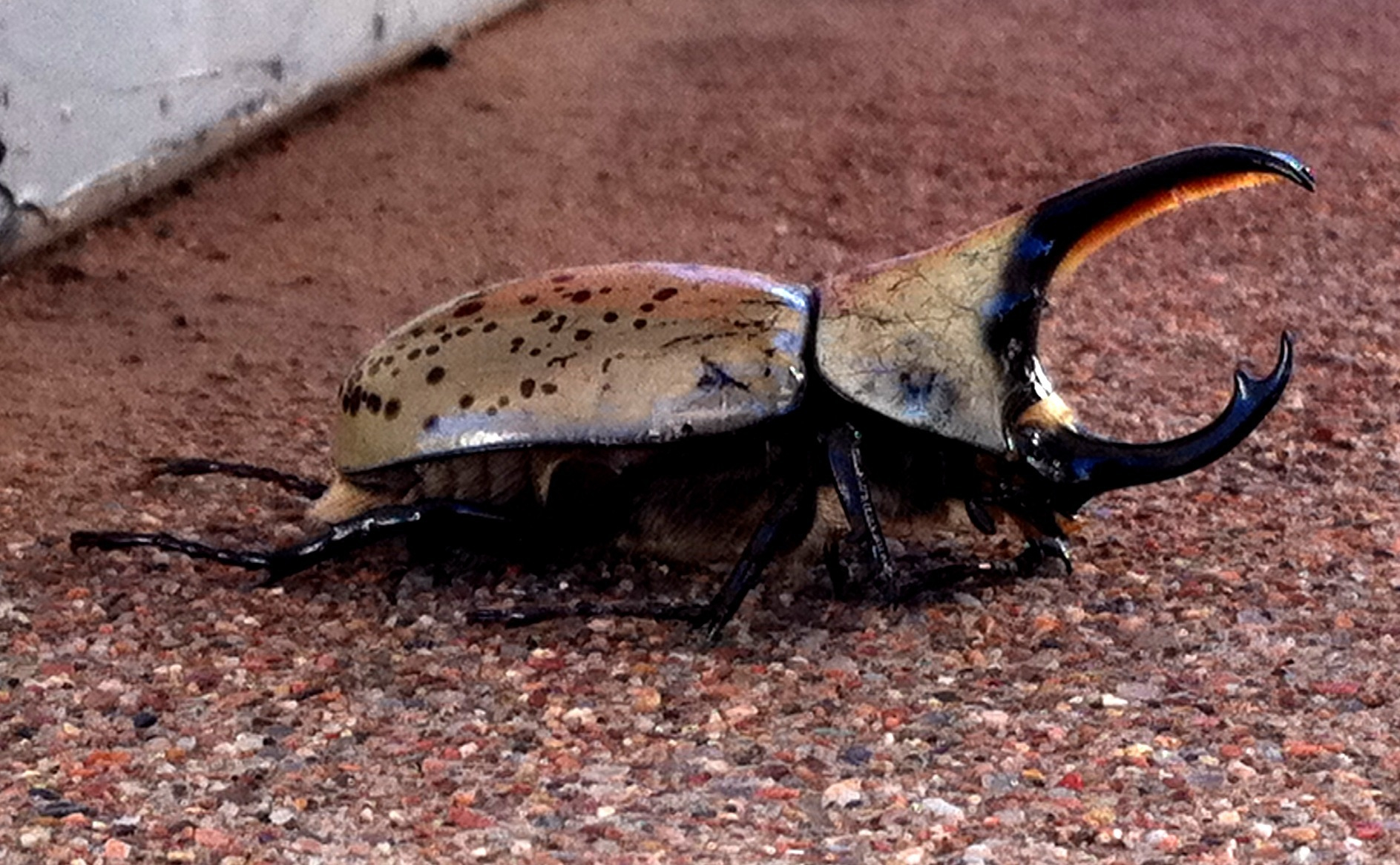
Adult male

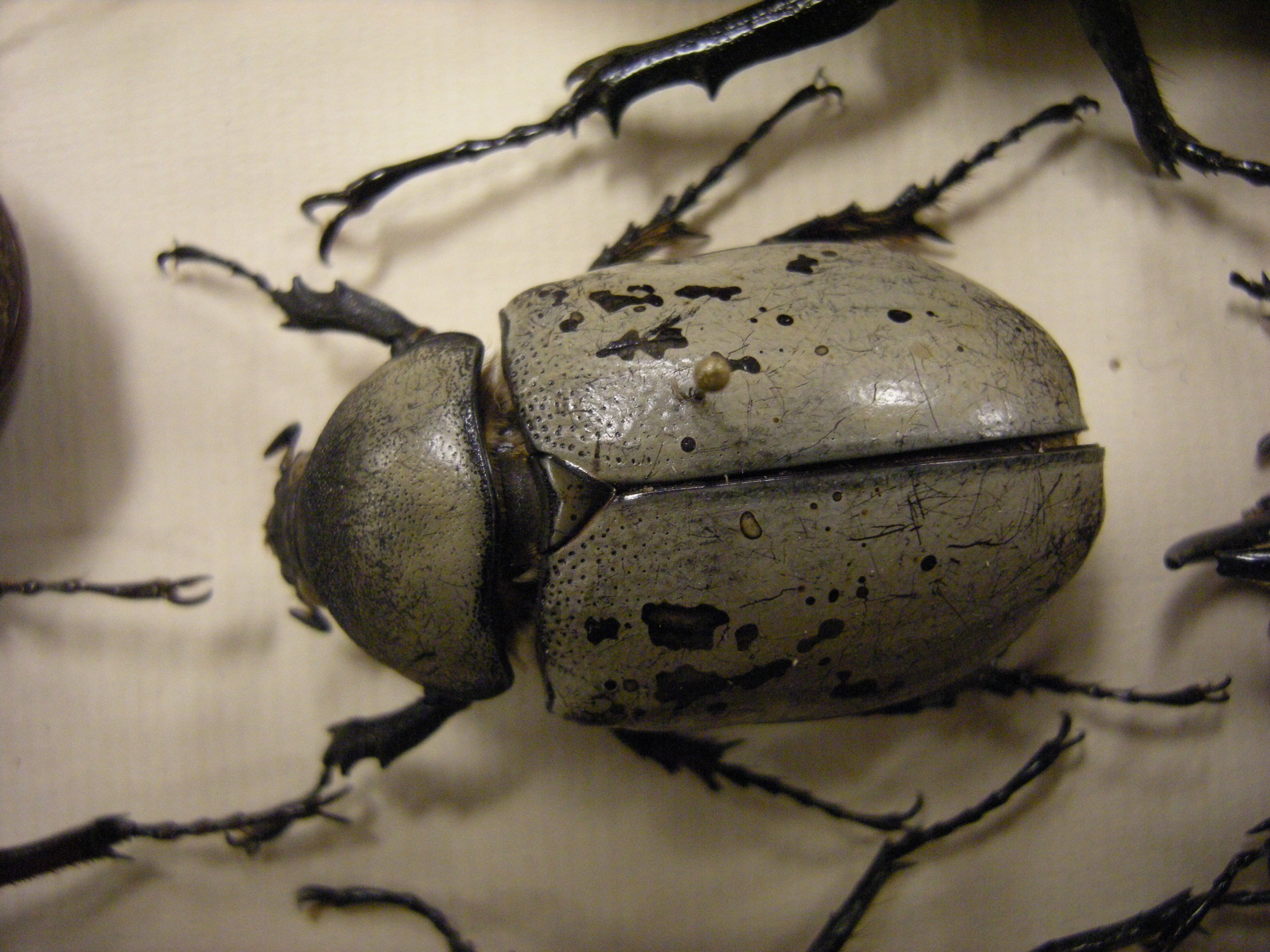
Adult female

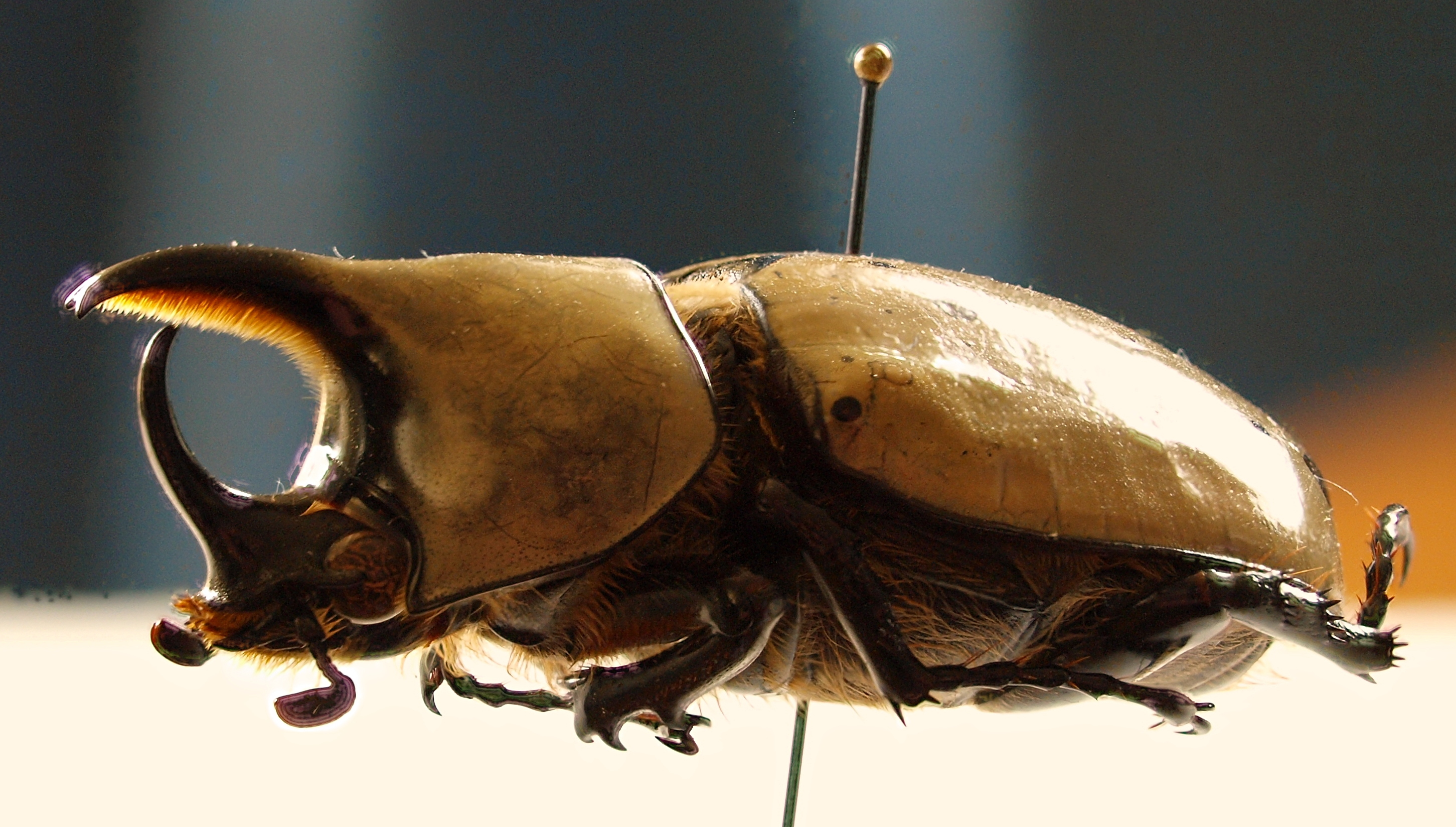
Adult male

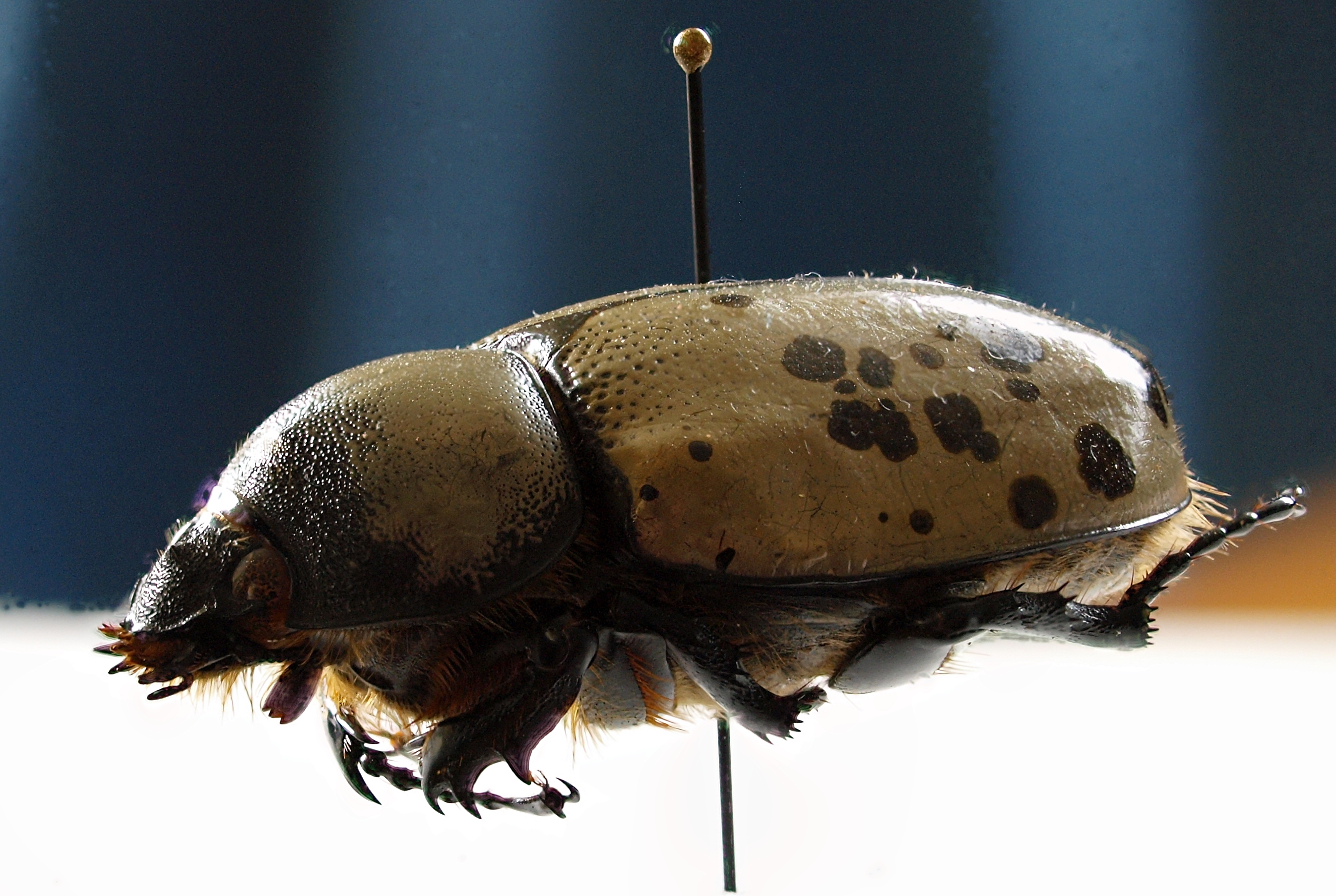
Adult female

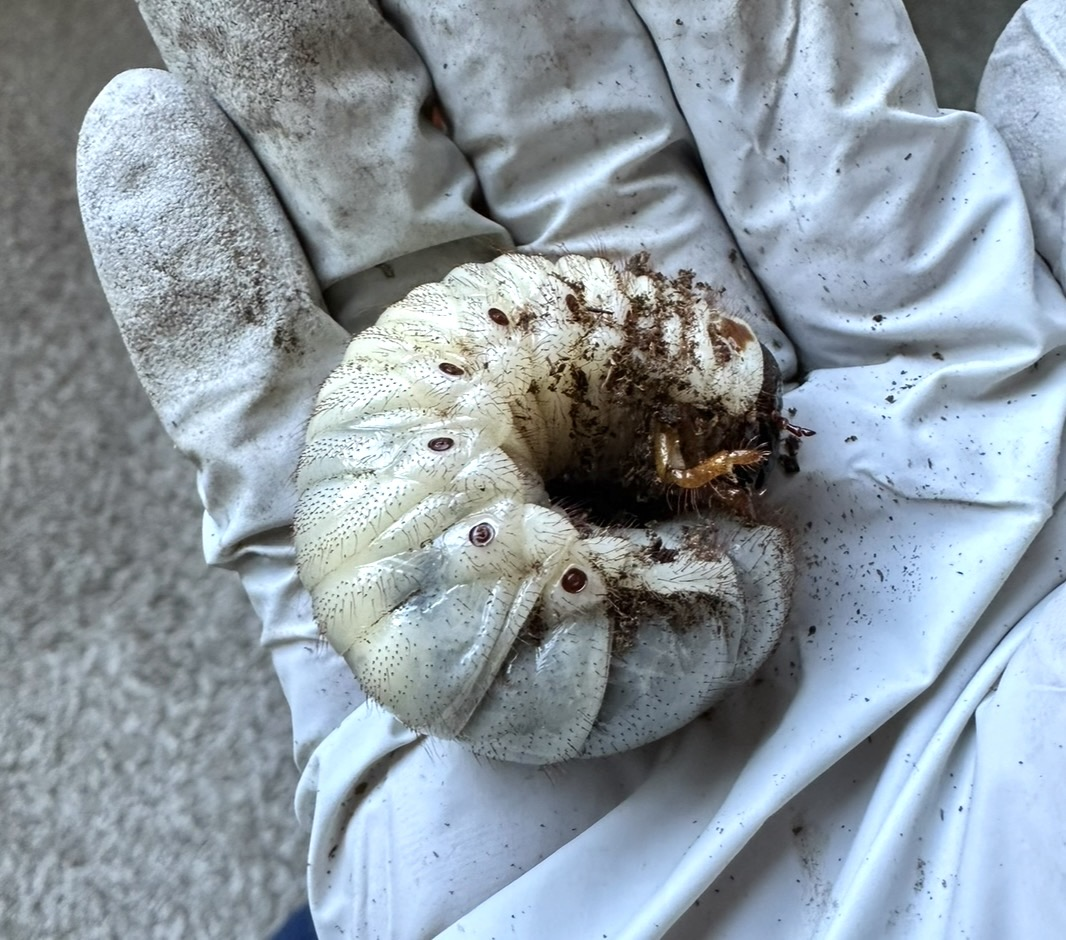
Instar 3 larva

== See also ==
- Dynastes tityus
