= Satanique =

Satanique (French for "of Satan" or "satanic") may refer to:

- Opération Satanique, a French plot to destroy Greenpeace's presence in the Pacific, see Sinking of the Rainbow Warrior
- Les Sataniques a series of etchings and aquatints published by Félicien Rops in 1882
- Satanique, a name given to the Storm petrel

== See also ==
- Poeme Satanique, Opus 36, by Alexander Scriabin, see List of compositions by Alexander Scriabin
- Satanik, an Italian noir comic book
- Satanism (disambiguation)
