= Satan (comics) =

Satan, in comics, may refer to:

- Satan (Image Comics), the ruler of Hell in the Spawn universe
- A number of characters who assumed the identity of Satan in the Marvel Universe, in particular Marduk Kurios, who initially went by the name "Satan" and had two children:
  - Daimon Hellstrom, who goes by the name "Son of Satan" and, after defeating his father, he ruled Hell and became "Satan"
  - Satana (Marvel Comics), Satan's daughter
- Satan, a DC Comics character who appeared in a number of stories in the 1980s, in particular with Deadman in Action Comics
- Mr. Satan, a fictional character in the manga series Dragon Ball
- Satan's Six, a Topps Comics title, part of Jack Kirby's "Kirbyverse" which centered on the Secret City Saga
- The Satan Claw, a weapon used by Baron Strucker

== See also ==
- Satan (disambiguation)
- Lucifer (comics)
- Satannish, a Marvel Comics demon, also named as Satana and Hellstrom's father by Steve Englehart
- Satanus (comics), a dinosaur from a number of 2000 AD stories
- Lord Satanus, A DC Comics character
- Satanika, a comics title from Verotik
- Satanis, a DC Comics character, also known as Lord Satanis
