= Satana =

Satana may refer to:

- Satana, name for the Devil in various languages, variation of Satan
- Satana (Marvel Comics), a fictional character in Marvel Comics
- Satana, India, a town in Nashik district, Maharashtra, India
- Satanaya, aka Satana, a mythological figure from the Nart saga of the Northern Caucasus
- Tura Satana (born 1935), Japanese-American actress
- Satana, a fictional character in the Italian horror-western comic Djustine

== See also ==
- Satan (disambiguation)
- Satanas (disambiguation)
- Sattanar, Tamil poet from ancient India, author of the Buddhist epic Manimekhalai
