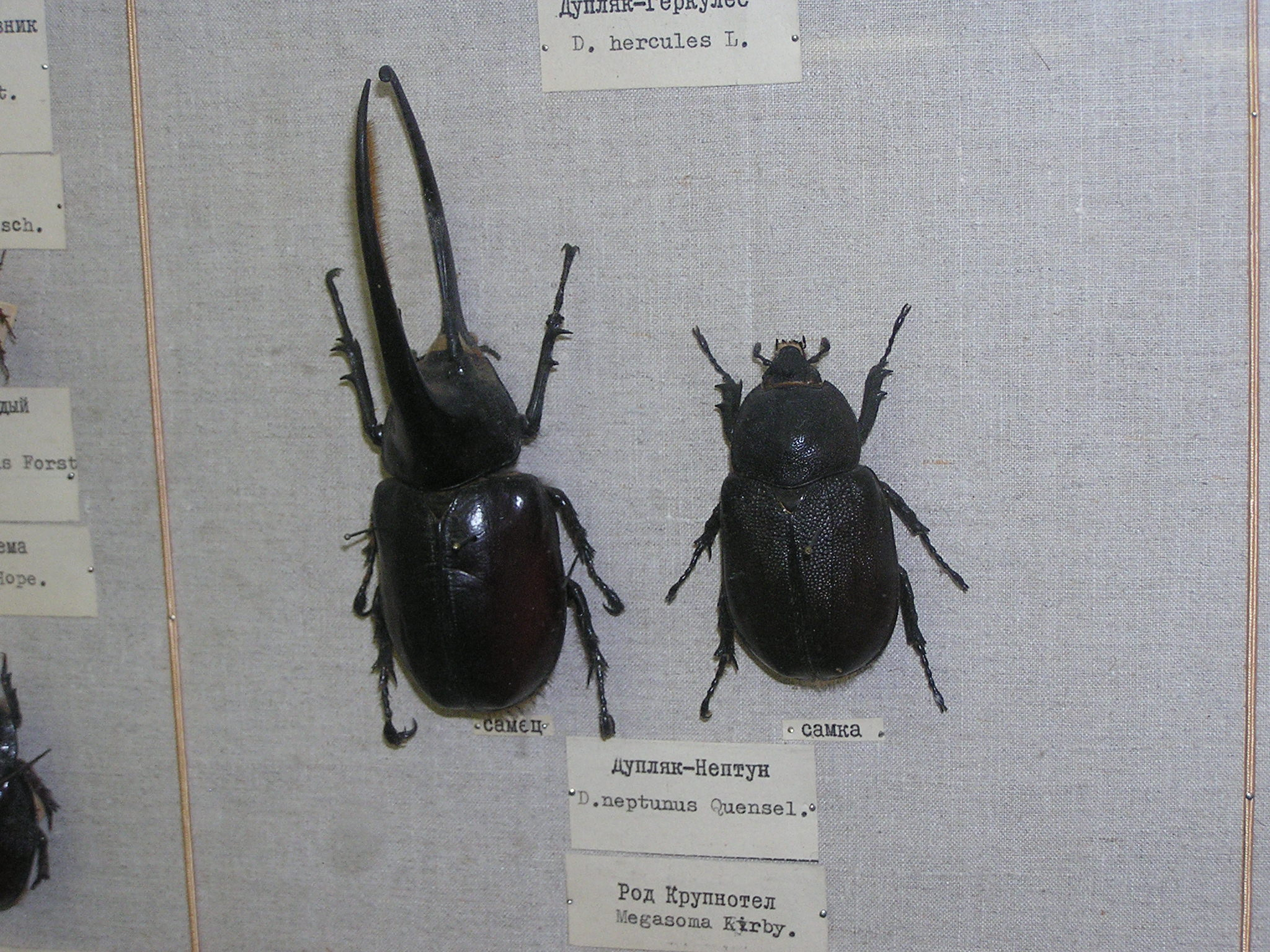
- Male (left) and female

Scientific classification
- Domain: Eukaryota
- Kingdom: Animalia
- Phylum: Arthropoda
- Class: Insecta
- Order: Coleoptera
- Suborder: Polyphaga
- Infraorder: Scarabaeiformia
- Family: Scarabaeidae
- Genus: Dynastes
- Species: D. neptunus

Binomial name
- Dynastes neptunus Quensel, 1805

= Dynastes neptunus =

Species of insect

Dynastes neptunus is a beetle in the family Scarabaeidae. D. neptunus is very similar to the Hercules beetle (Dynastes hercules) but differs from it in slightly larger size and more of a slender and curved horns.

== Description ==
D. neptunus is 12 to 15.5 cm (4.7 to 6.1 in) long with a black body. Sexual dimorphism is present in the species; for example, males having large ''horns'' on their heads and are much smoother than females. This species is similar to the hercules beetle but is larger and has slender, curved horns.

== Distribution ==
This species lives in the northwestern regions of South America in the countries of Colombia, Peru, Ecuador, and Venezuela.

== Diet ==
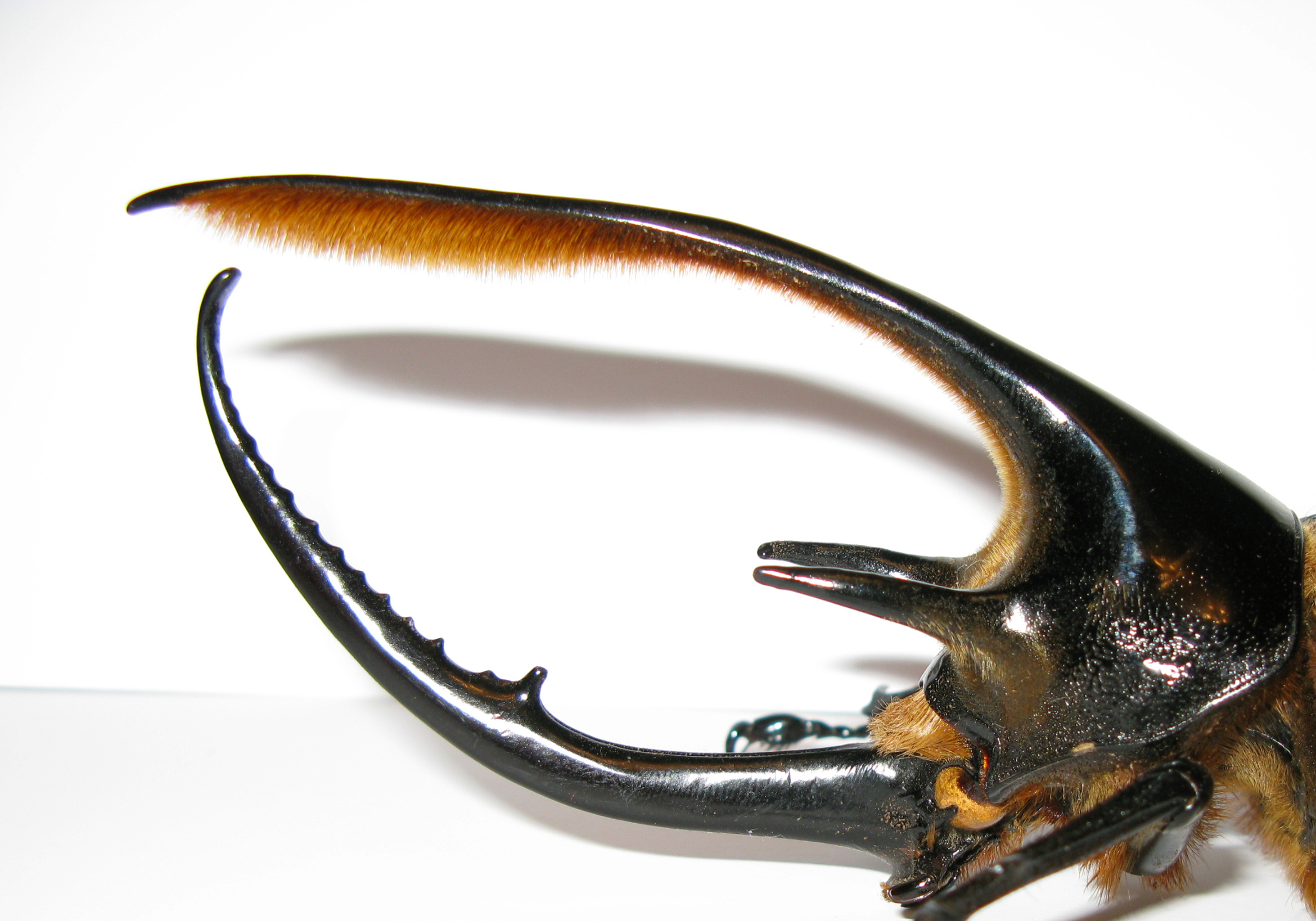
Close-up of the male head

Larvae feed on decaying, rotten wood and adults will eat fruit.
