= Shaytan (disambiguation) =

Shaytan pl. Shayatin is a Hebrew and Arabic term referring to Satan or to satans.

The name Shaytan may refer to:

== Mythology ==
- Al-Shaitan, Satan in Islam
- Shaitan, demon in Islamic mythology
- Accuser angel, angel in the Hebrew Bible, who tempts humans into sin, and later accuses them in God's heavenly court
- satans, used in reference to fallen angels in Enoch

== See also ==
- Shaitan (disambiguation)
- Gerd Sheytan, a village in Iran
