= Shahidan, Iran =

Shahidan (Persian: شهيدان) may refer to:

- Shahidan, Fars
- Shahidan, Gilan
- Shahidan, Sistan and Baluchestan
