= Dynastes maya =

Scientific classification
- Domain: Eukaryota
- Kingdom: Animalia
- Phylum: Arthropoda
- Class: Insecta
- Order: Coleoptera
- Suborder: Polyphaga
- Infraorder: Scarabaeiformia
- Family: Scarabaeidae
- Genus: Dynastes
- Species: D. maya

Binomial name
- Dynastes maya Hardy, M. 2003

Species of beetle

Dynastes maya, the Maya white beetle, is a species of New World scarab beetles (Scarabaeidae). It has a distribution range in the Central American region, specifically in southern Mexico, Honduras, and Guatemala.

== Taxonomy ==
D. maya is part of the genus Dynastes, whose species include the Hercules beetle. D. maya is sister species to Dynastes moroni.

== Description ==
The horns on males of this species are thick and stout pronotal. This species elytra has an olive coloured green coloration to it. The species is morphologically similar to the species Dynastes hyllus and Dynastes hercules. The coloration of its body might be because of introgression from Dynastes septentrionalis, a sympatric species of Hercules beetle.
