= Satan (disambiguation) =

Satan is an embodiment of antagonism, often synonymous with the Devil.

Satan, Satanael, Satanas, or Satanás may also refer to:

== Arts and entertainment ==
=== Comics ===
- Satan (Image Comics), a character of the comic-book series Spawn

=== Literature ===
- Satan, a character in Mark Twain's unfinished book The Mysterious Stranger
- 666 Satan, a Japanese manga series written and illustrated by Seishi Kishimoto
- Satan, a character in Japanese manga Blue Exorcist
- Satanas, the nickname of a character, Justin Alastair, Duke of Avon, in Georgette Heyer's 1926 book These Old Shades
- Satanás, a 2002 novel by Colombian writer Mario Mendoza Zambrano, on which the film was based
- Satan, pen name of Mathieu Georges Dairnvaell, French antisemitic pamphleteer

=== Film and television ===
- Satan (German: Satanas), a 1920 German silent film
- Satan (Russian: Сатана), a 1991 Soviet film
- Satan, a recurring character in South Park
- Mr. Satan, a character in Dragon Ball media
- Satan, or Saathan, an Indian film character played by Prithviraj Sukumaran in the 2002 film Stop Violence and its 2012 sequel Asuravithu
- "Satanas", the seventh installment of Louis Feuillade's 1915–16 French serial film, Les Vampires
- Satanás, a 2007 Colombian film

=== Music ===
- Satan, an English heavy-metal band
- "Satan", a song by Deerhoof which originally appeared on the album Holdypaws
- "Satan", a song by Orbital which originally appeared on the EP III
- "Satan", a song by Teenage Fanclub which appeared on the album Bandwagonesque
- Satan, a 1974 album by Sonny Stit

=== Radio ===
- Satan, a character in the UK radio comedy Old Harry's Game

=== Video games ===
- Satan, a character in the Puyo Puyo video-game series, later renamed to Dark Prince
- Satan, the main antagonist of the video game Saints Row: Gat out of Hell

== Science and technology ==
=== Biology and medicine ===
==== Animals ====
- Satan, a genus of sightless catfish
- Satanas, a genus of flies
- The Satanas beetle

=== Computing ===
- Security Administrator Tool for Analyzing Networks (SATAN), a networking analyzer

=== Military ===
- Satan, a nickname for an M3 Stuart modified to carry the Ronson flamethrower
- SS-18 Satan, NATO reporting name of the R-36M Soviet intercontinental ballistic missile
- Satan II, nickname for the RS-28 Sarmat Russian intercontinental ballistic missile

== Other uses ==
- Great Satan (Persian: شيطان بزرگ, Sheytân-e Bozorg) and Little Satan (Persian: شیطان کوچک, Shaytân-e Kuchak; Arabic: الشيطان الأصغر; Hebrew: השטן הקטן), demonizing epithets for the United States of America and Israel, respectively, in Iranian foreign-policy statements
- The Satanas (gang), (AKA Ese Te Ese, or STS) a Filipino American street gang in Southern California

== See also ==
- God and Satan (disambiguation)
- Devil (disambiguation)
- Lucifer (disambiguation)
- Satanic (disambiguation)
- Satanist (disambiguation)
- Satanism (disambiguation)
- Shaitan (disambiguation), the Islamic counterpart
- Satanaya, a mythological figure who appears in many cycles of the Nart sagas of the Caucasus
- Miroslav Šatan, an ice-hockey player
- Satin, an older English spelling for the type of cloth
- Seitan, a wheat protein
