= Dynastes moroni =

Scientific classification
- Domain: Eukaryota
- Kingdom: Animalia
- Phylum: Arthropoda
- Class: Insecta
- Order: Coleoptera
- Suborder: Polyphaga
- Infraorder: Scarabaeiformia
- Family: Scarabaeidae
- Genus: Dynastes
- Species: D. moroni

Binomial name
- Dynastes moroni Nagai, 2005

Synonyms
- Dynastes hyllus moroni Nagai, 2005

Species of beetle

Dynastes moroni is a large scarab beetle endemic to the Sierra de los Tuxtlas region in Mexico.

== Taxonomy ==
This beetle species was originally described as a subspecies, Dynastes hyllus moroni, but subsequent genetic analyses clearly indicate that it is unrelated to Dynastes hyllus; D. hyllus is sister to Dynastes grantii, while D. moroni is sister to Dynastes maya.
