= Shatian =

Shatian may refer to:

- Shatian Township (沙田乡), subdivision of Ningxiang County, Hunan

== Towns ==
- Shatian, Dongguan (沙田镇), Guangdong
- Shatian, Fengshun County (砂田镇), Guangdong
- Shatian, Gaozhou (沙田镇), subdivision of Gaozhou, Guangdong
- Shatian, Huizhou (沙田镇), subdivision of Huiyang District, Huizhou, Guangdong
- Shatian, Xinfeng County (沙田镇), subdivision of Xinfeng County, Guangdong
- Shatian, Hepu County (沙田镇), subdivision of Hepu County, Guangxi
- Shatian, Hezhou (沙田镇), subdivision of Pinggui District, Hezhou, Guangxi
- Shatian, Yulin, Guangxi (沙田镇), subdivision of Yuzhou District, Yulin, Guangxi
- Shatian, Guidong County (沙田镇), subdivision of Guidong County, Hunan
- Shatian, Jiangxi (沙田镇), subdivision of Guangfeng District, Shangrao, Jiangxi

== See also ==
- Sha Tin (Chinese: 沙田; pinyin: Shātián), an area in Hong Kong
- Sha Tin District, in Hong Kong
- Sha Tin New Town, in Hong Kong
- Shaitan (disambiguation)
