= Lucifer (comics) =

Lucifer, in comics, may refer to:

- Lucifer (DC Comics), a comic book character from DC Comics
- Lucifer (Marvel Comics), the name of two unrelated Marvel Comics characters
- Lucifer (Image Comics), the name of two unrelated Image Comics characters (one from Supreme and one from The Wicked + The Divine)
- A comic book series by Eddie Campbell and Phil Elliott, published by Trident Comics
- A Chaos! Comics character who has appeared in Lady Death and in Evil Ernie

== See also ==
- Lucifer (disambiguation)
- Lucifera (comics), an Italian comic character
- Satan (comics), other characters based on the Devil
