= Satanic Verses (disambiguation) =

The Satanic Verses are words of "Satanic suggestion" that the Islamic prophet Muhammad allegedly mistook for divine revelation.

Satanic Verses may also refer to:

- The Satanic Verses, a 1988 novel by Salman Rushdie
  - The Satanic Verses controversy, a controversy surrounding the novel
- "Satanic Verses" (song), a 1994 song by Flatlinerz

== See also ==
- Satanic (disambiguation)
- Verses (disambiguation)
- Codex Gigas, also known as the Devil's Bible, a 13th-century illuminated manuscript
- The Satanic Bible, a 1969 book by Anton LaVey
- The Satanic Rituals, a 1972 book by Anton LaVey
- The Satanic Scriptures, a 2007 book by Peter H. Gilmore
