= Shahidan, Sistan and Baluchestan =

Shahidan شهيدان
- Village
- Location within Iran
- Coordinates: 27°03′56″N 61°12′07″E
- Country: Iran
- Province: Sistan and Baluchestan
- County: Iranshahr
- Bakhsh: Central
- Rural District: Abtar

Population (2006)
  - Total: 155
- Time zone: UTC+3:30 (IRST)
  - Summer (DST): UTC+4:30 (IRDT)

Shahidan (Persian: شهيدان, also Romanized as Shahīdān) is a village in Abtar Rural District, in the Central District of Iranshahr County, Sistan and Baluchestan Province, Iran. At the 2006 census, its population was 155, in 33 families.
