= Lucifer (disambiguation) =

Lucifer is a folklore figure associated with the planet Venus, subsequently used in Christianity as a name for the devil.

Lucifer may also refer to:

== Astronomy ==
- Lucifer, the ancient Roman name for the planet Venus; see Venus in culture
- 1930 Lucifer, an asteroid

== People ==
- Lucifer of Cagliari (d. May 20, 370 or 371), bishop of Cagliari (353–370/371)
- Lucifer of Siena (c. 306), first bishop of Siena
- Lucifer (wrestler), ring name of professional wrestler Tim Burke (1960–2011)
- "Lucifer", pseudonym used by composer Mort Garson for his 1971 album Black Mass
- "Lucifer", an alias used by Dunk Rock, vocalist for the band UFX
- Hendrick Lucifer (1583–1627), famous pirate and brute

== Arts, entertainment, and media ==
=== Art ===
- Lucifer, 1945 bronze statue at the entrance hall of Birmingham Museum and Art Gallery by Sir Jacob Epstein
- Le génie du mal, known informally in English as Lucifer or The Lucifer of Liège, 1848 religious sculpture executed in white marble
- Lucifer (Stuck), an 1890 painting by Franz Stuck

=== Books, literature and periodicals ===
- Lucifer (magazine), a journal published by Helena Blavatsky
- Lucifer (play), written by Joost van den Vondel in the 17th century about the fallen angel
- "Lucifer," a 1964 short story by Roger Zelazny from The Doors of His Face, The Lamps of His Mouth, and Other Stories
- Lucifer (comics), with several meanings

=== Film and TV ===
- Lucifer (1921 film), lost Austrian film with Anita Berber
- Lucifer (2019 Indian film)
- Lucifer (2019 Nigerian film)
- Luzifer (film), 2021 Austrian film
- "Lucifer", a chapter from the 2026 Indian film Dhurandhar: The Revenge
- Lucifer (South Korean TV series), a 2007 television series
- Lucifer (TV series), a 2016 American Fox/Netflix television series

==== Fictional characters ====
- Lucifer (Battlestar Galactica), a Cylon character in Battlestar Galactica
- Lucifer (Cinderella), the family cat in Disney's animated movie Cinderella
- Lucifer, a character in the video game DemiKids
- Lucifer Morningstar (Hazbin Hotel), a demonic king character in Hazbin Hotel
- Lucifer, a character in Supernatural
- Lucifer (DC Comics), a character created by Neil Gaiman for DC Comics and later adapted into a TV show of the same name
- Lucifer, a demonic CEO character in Helltaker

=== Music ===
==== Groups ====
- Lucifer (multinational band), a Swedish/German heavy metal band formed in 2014
- Lucifer (British band), a solo rock project formed in 1972
- Lucifer (Dutch band), a pop group formed in the 1970s
- Lucifer (Japanese band), a rock band formed in 1999
- Lucifer, a 1970s Detroit soul/jazz group signed to Invictus Records

==== Albums ====
- Lucifer (Kenny Barron album), 1975
- Lucifer (Peaking Lights album), 2025
- Lucifer (Shinee album), 2010
- Lucifer: Book of Angels Volume 10, a 2008 album by the Bar Kokhba Sextet composed by John Zorn
- Lucifer (soundtrack), soundtrack album from the 2019 film of the same name
- Lucifer, a 2003 album by Of the Wand & the Moon
- Lucifer, a 2012 album by Peaking Lights

==== Songs ====
- "Lucifer" (Bob Seger song), 1970
- "Lucifer" (Blue System song), 1991
- "Lucifer" (Eminem and Sly Pyper song), 2024
- "Lucifer" (Shinee song), 2010
- "Lucifer", a 1979 instrumental song by the Alan Parsons Project from Eve
- "Lucifer", a 2009 song by Behemoth from Evangelion
- "Lucifer", a 2007 song by Blutengel from Labyrinth
- "Lucifer", a 2024 song by Enhypen from Memorabilia
- "Lucifer", a 2003 song by Jay-Z from The Black Album
- "Lucifer", a 2015 song by XOV

== Science and technology ==
- Lucifer (cipher), a block cipher which was the forerunner to DES
- Lucifer (crustacean), a genus of sea life
- LUCIFER, original name for an infrared detector on the Large Binocular Telescope in southeastern Arizona, United States

== Other uses ==
- Lucifer match, an obsolete word for matches, especially the non-safety type tipped with potassium chlorate and antimony sulfide

== See also ==
- Lucifer Hill, a mountain
- Lucifer Peak, a mountain in Canada
- Lucifer Rising (film)
- Lucifera (comics), an Italian comic character
- Lucifera Demon Lover, a film
- Luciferase, a bioluminescent enzyme
- Luciferin, a generic term for the light-emitting compound found in organisms that generate bioluminescence
- Luciferianism, a system of beliefs
