= Shaitan elchini =

Scientific classification
- Kingdom: Animalia
- Phylum: Arthropoda
- Subphylum: Chelicerata
- Class: Arachnida
- Order: Araneae
- Infraorder: Araneomorphae
- Family: Gnaphosidae
- Genus: Shaitan; Kovblyuk, Kastrygina & Marusik, 2013
- Species: S. elchini

Binomial name
- Shaitan elchini Kovblyuk, Kastrygina & Marusik, 2013

Genus of spiders

Shaitan is a monotypic genus of ground spiders containing the single species, Shaitan elchini. It was first described by M. M. Kovblyuk, Z. A. Kastrygina & Yuri M. Marusik in 2013, and has only been found in Russia, Azerbaijan, and Kazakhstan.
