= Satanist (disambiguation) =

A Satanist is an adherent of Satanism.

Satanist may also refer to:

== Literature ==
- The Satanist (Wheatley novel), a 1960 spy horror novel by Dennis Wheatley
- The Satanist, a 1912 gothic novel by Mrs Hugh Fraser

== Music ==
- The Satanist (album), an album by the Polish extreme metal band Behemoth
- "Satanist", a song by Swedish band The Crown from the album Crowned In Terror

== See also ==
- Satanism (disambiguation)
- Satan (disambiguation)
