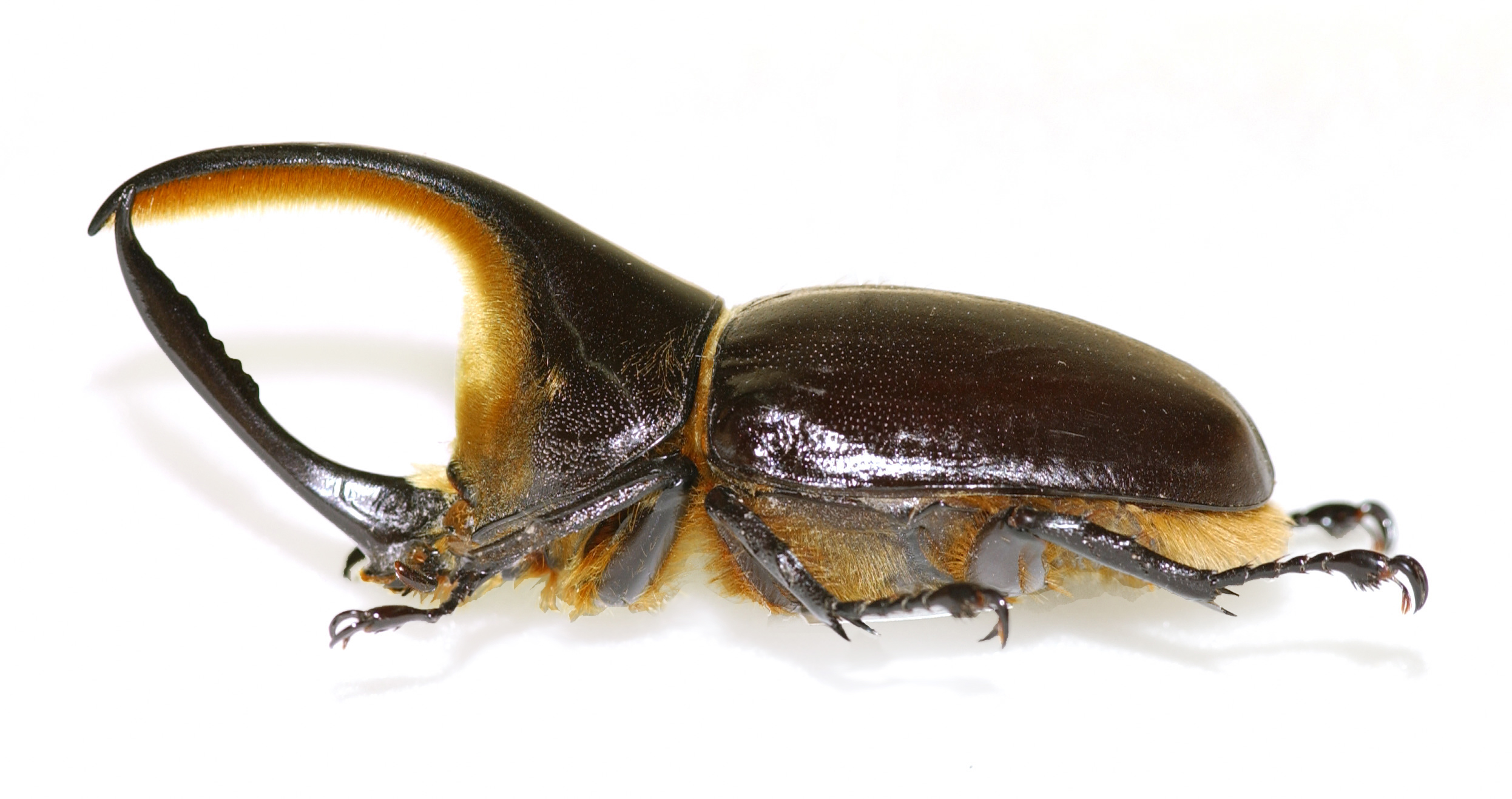
- CITES Appendix II (CITES)

Scientific classification
- Kingdom: Animalia
- Phylum: Arthropoda
- Class: Insecta
- Order: Coleoptera
- Suborder: Polyphaga
- Infraorder: Scarabaeiformia
- Family: Scarabaeidae
- Genus: Dynastes
- Species: D. satanas

Binomial name
- Dynastes satanas Moser, 1909

= Dynastes satanas =

Species of beetle

Dynastes satanas, the Satanas beetle, is a species of beetle belonging to the family Scarabaeidae. The name is sometimes misspelled as "satanus".

Because of collecting and habitat loss this rare species is protected and included in the list of insects regulated by the Convention on International Trade in Endangered Species of Wild Fauna and Flora (CITES).

== Description ==
Dynastes satanas can reach a length of 50–115 millimetres (2.0–4.5 in) in males, of about 30–55 millimetres (1.2–2.2 in) in the females. The males have one large horn on the pronotum, with a dense reddish pubescence on the underside of the horn. A smaller horn arises from the head. Body, pronotum and elytra are black in both sexes. In the females the clypeus is narrowly rounded at apex.

== Life cycle ==
These beetles have a biennial life cycle. Females lay 25-40 eggs, hatching in about two months. Larval stages last about 1.5–2 years. The larvae feed on dead tree trunks, while the adults feed on fruits, sap and nectar.

== Distribution ==
This species is endemic to Bolivia. It can be found in moist forest areas in the mountain hills at an elevation of 900–2,200 metres (3,000–7,200 ft) above sea level.

== Bibliography ==
- Moser J. (1909) Eine neue Dynastes-Art, Deutsche entomologische Zeitschrift :112
- Scarabs: World Scarabaeidae Database. Schoolmeesters P., 2011-05-30
