= Satanic panic (disambiguation) =

The Satanic panic is a widespread moral panic consisting of alleged cases of Satanic ritual abuse starting in the United States in the 1980s, spreading throughout many parts of the world by the late 1990s, and persisting today.

Satanic panic may also refer to:

- Satanic panic (Utah), the Satanic panic in Utah
- Satanic panic (South Africa), the Satanic panic in South Africa
- Satanic Panic (film), a 2019 American film
- Satanic Panic, a 2000 album by Transport League
- Satanic Panic, a fictional band in an episode of the television series Chilling Adventures of Sabrina

== See also ==
- Satanic Panic in the Attic, a 2004 album by of Montreal
- Seven Inches of Satanic Panic, a 2019 EP by Ghost
