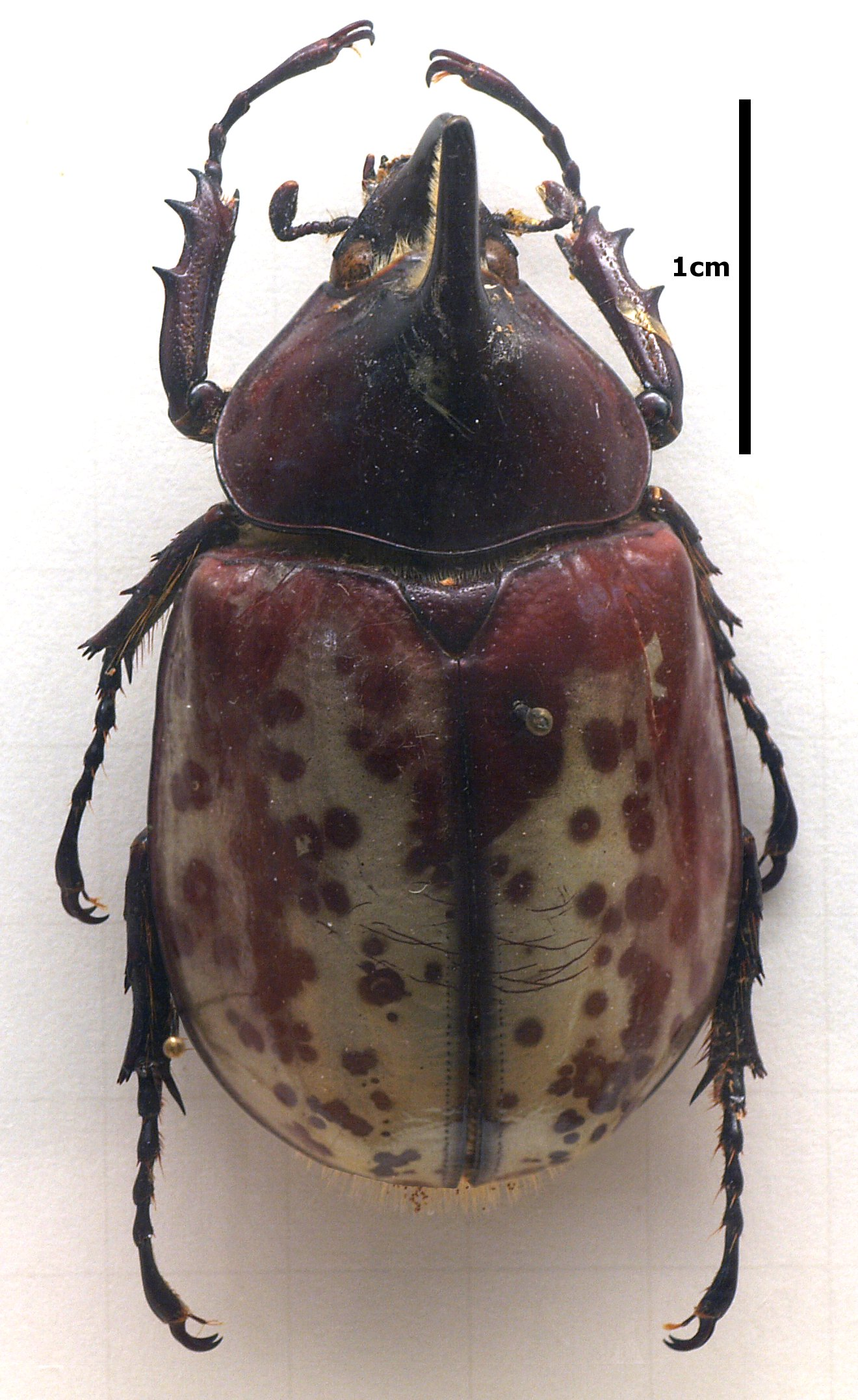
- Specimen from Mexico

Scientific classification
- Domain: Eukaryota
- Kingdom: Animalia
- Phylum: Arthropoda
- Class: Insecta
- Order: Coleoptera
- Suborder: Polyphaga
- Infraorder: Scarabaeiformia
- Family: Scarabaeidae
- Genus: Dynastes
- Species: D. hyllus

Binomial name
- Dynastes hyllus Chevrolat, 1843

Synonyms
- Dynastes iphiclus Burmeister, 1847; Dynastes miyashitai Yamaya, 2004; Dynastes moroni Nagai, 2005

= Dynastes hyllus =

Species of beetle

Dynastes hyllus is a large scarab beetle species that ranges from Mexico to Guatemala. Its larvae have been found to associate with the logs of Persea americana.

== Taxonomy ==
There were two subspecies recognized, D. hyllus hyllus and D. hyllus moroni, but subsequent genetic analyses clearly indicate that they are unrelated to one another; D. hyllus hyllus is sister to Dynastes grantii, while D. hyllus moroni is sister to Dynastes maya, so moroni is presently considered a separate species.
