= Satanism (disambiguation) =

Satanism is a belief or social phenomenon that features the veneration or admiration of Satan or a similar figure.

Satanism may also refer to:

- LaVeyan Satanism, a non-theistic Satanic religion founded by Anton LaVey
- Church of Satan, a non-theistic Satanic organization dedicated to LaVeyan Satanism
- First Satanic Church, a non-theistic Satanic organization dedicated to LaVeyan Satanism
- The Satanic Temple, a non-theistic Satanic religious organization promoting political activism, secularism, and bodily autonomy
- Theistic Satanism, the worship of Satan as a deity
- Satanic ritual abuse, a moral panic that occurred near the end of the 20th century
- Satanism: A Social History, a 2016 book by Massimo Introvigne

== See also ==
- Satanist (disambiguation)
- Satan (disambiguation)
