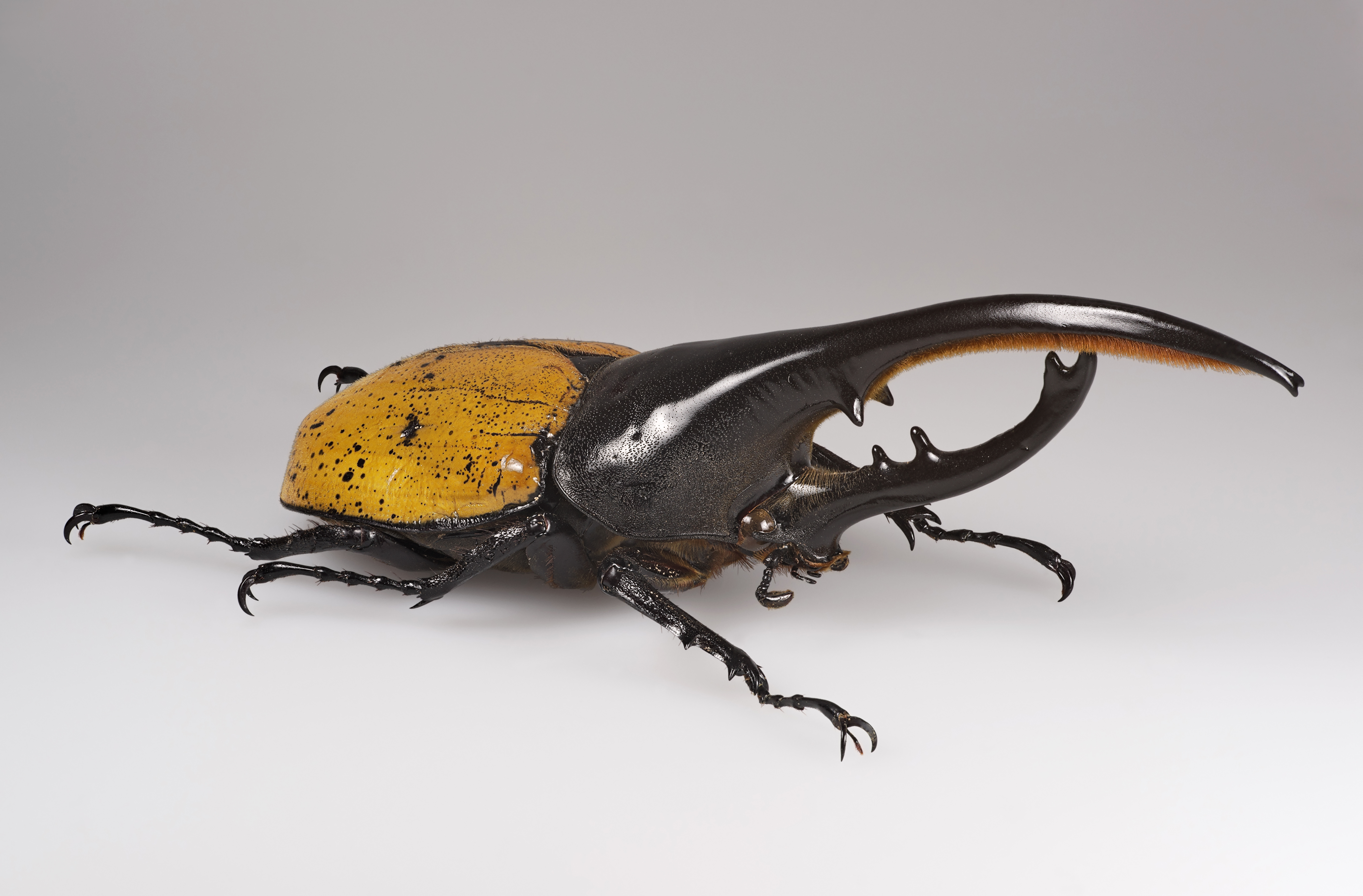
- Male Hercules beetle, Dynastes hercules ecuatorianus

Scientific classification
- Kingdom: Animalia
- Phylum: Arthropoda
- Clade: Pancrustacea
- Class: Insecta
- Order: Coleoptera
- Suborder: Polyphaga
- Infraorder: Scarabaeiformia
- Family: Scarabaeidae
- Genus: Dynastes
- Species: D. hercules

Binomial name
- Dynastes hercules (Linnaeus, 1758)

Synonyms
- Scarabaeus hercules Linnaeus, 1758, 1758; Scarabaeus scaber Linnaeus, 1758, 1764; Scarabaeus oculatus Scopoli, 1772; Scarabaeus alcides Fabricius, 1781; Scarabaeus iphiclus Panzer, 1782; Scarabaeus perseus Olivier, 1789; Dynastes alcides (Fabricius, 1781); Dynastes lagaii Verrill, 1906; Dynastes vulcan Verrill, 1906; Dynastes argentata Verrill, 1907; Dynastes hercules niger Endrodi, 1947; Dynastes hercules caribaea Stehle & Stehle, 1958; Dynastes hercules baudrii Pinchon, 1976

= Hercules beetle =

Species of beetle

The Hercules beetle (Dynastes hercules) is a species of rhinoceros beetle native to the tropical forests of southern Mexico, Central America, South America, and the Lesser Antilles. It is the longest extant species of beetle in the world, and is also one of the largest flying insects in the world.

== Etymology ==
Dynastes hercules is known for its tremendous strength and is named after Hercules, a hero of classical mythology who is famed for his great strength.

== Taxonomy ==
D. hercules has a complex taxonomic history and has been known by several synonyms. It is in the subfamily Dynastinae (rhinoceros beetles) in the larger family Scarabaeidae (commonly known as scarab beetles). Not counting subspecies of D. hercules, seven other species are recognized in the genus Dynastes.

=== Subspecies ===
Several subspecies of D. hercules have been named, though still some uncertainty exists as to the validity of the named taxa.

- Dynastes hercules ecuatorianus Ohaus, 1913
- Dynastes hercules hercules (Linnaeus, 1758)
- Dynastes hercules lichyi Lachaume, 1985
- Dynastes hercules morishimai Nagai, 2002
- Dynastes hercules occidentalis Lachaume, 1985
- Dynastes hercules paschoali Grossi & Arnaud, 1993
- Dynastes hercules reidi Chalumeau, 1977 (= baudrii Pinchon, 1976)
- Dynastes hercules septentrionalis Lachaume, 1985 (= tuxtlaensis Moron, 1993)
- Dynastes hercules takakuwai Nagai, 2002
- Dynastes hercules trinidadensis Chalumeau & Reid, 1995 (= bleuzeni Silvestre and Dechambre, 1995)

== Description ==
Adult body sizes (not including the thoracic horn) vary between 50 and 85 mm (2.0 and 3.3 in) in length and 29 and 42 mm (1.1 and 1.7 in) in width. Male Hercules beetles may reach up to 173 mm (7 in) in length (including the horn), making them the longest species of beetle in the world, if jaws and/or horns are included in the measurement. The size of the horn is naturally variable, more so than any variation of the size of legs, wings, or overall body size in the species. This variability results from developmental mechanisms that coincide with genetic predisposition in relation to nutrition, stress, exposure to parasites, and/or physiological conditions.

Dynastes hercules is highly sexually dimorphic, with only males exhibiting the characteristic horns (one on the head, and a much larger one on the pronotum). The body of males is black with the exception of the elytra, which can have shades of olive-green. They have a black suture with sparsely distributed black spots elsewhere on the elytra. They have a slightly iridescent coloration to their elytra, which varies in color between specimens and may be affected by the humidity of the local environment in which they develop. At low humidity the elytra are olive-green or yellow in color, but darken to black at higher humidity due to its hygrochromic properties.

Females of D. hercules have punctured elytra which are usually entirely black, but sometimes have the last quarter of the elytra colored in the same way as the males.

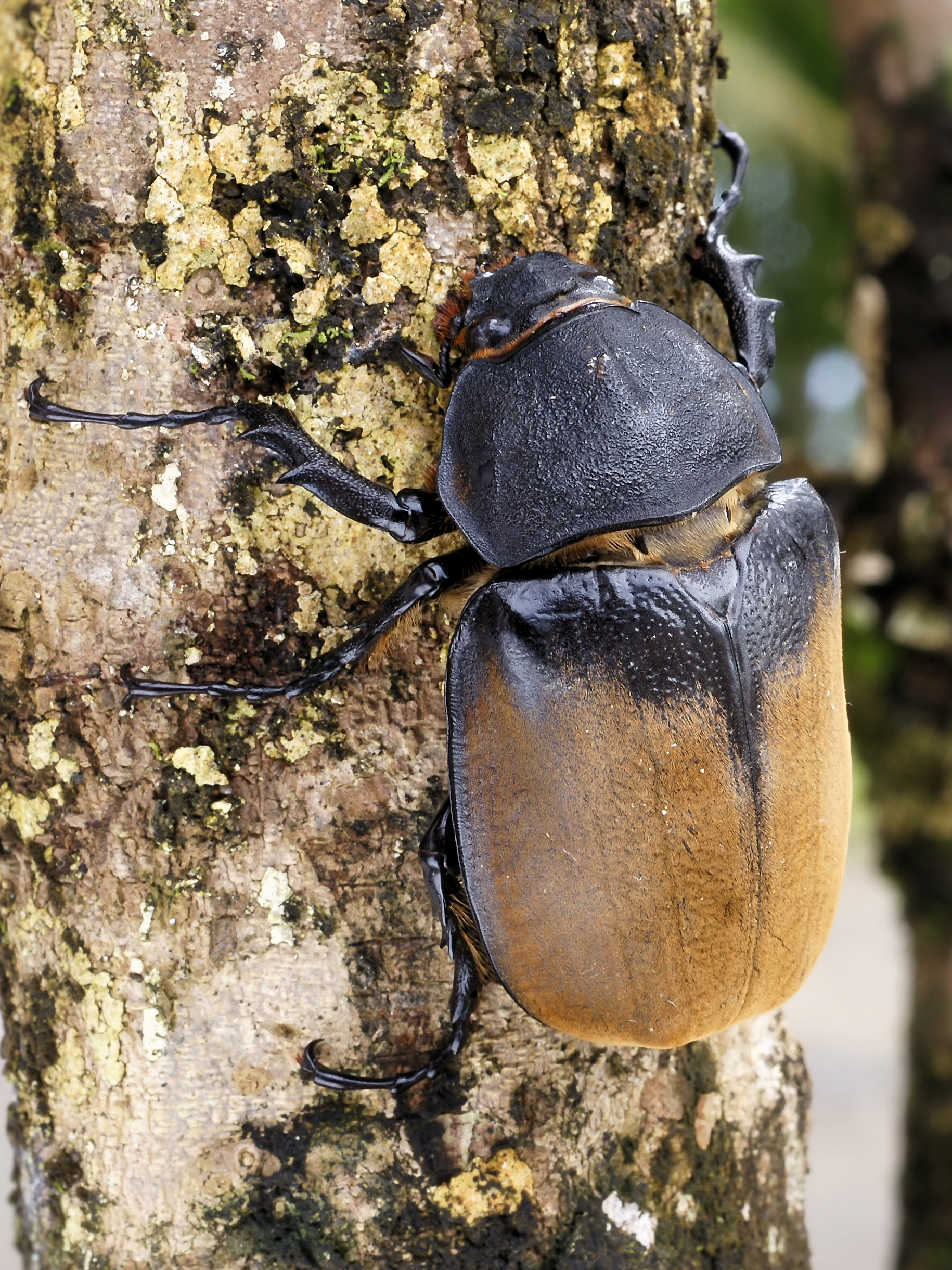
Female

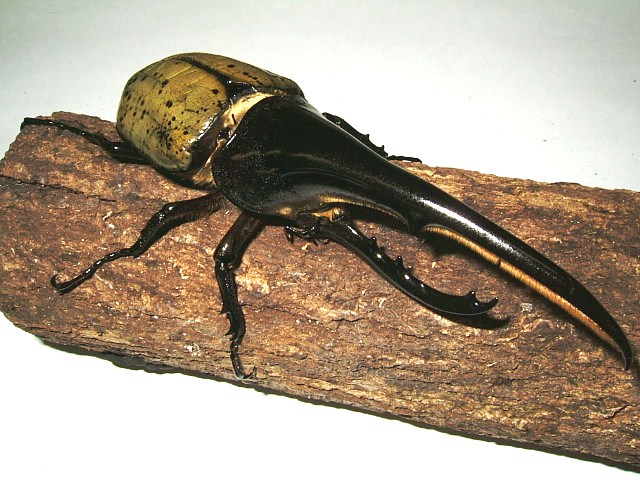
Male

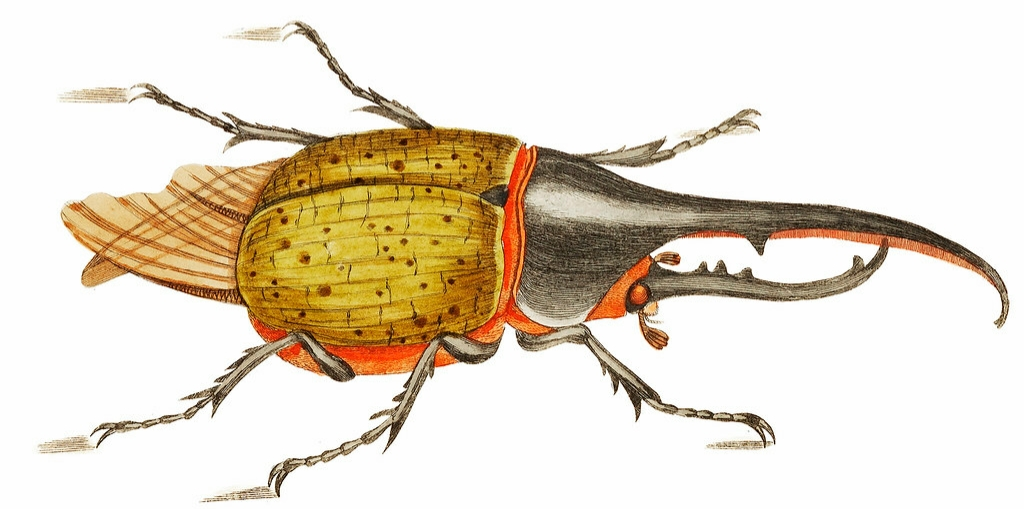
Hercules beetle illustration from The Naturalist's Miscellany (1789–1813) by George Shaw (1751–1813).

== Distribution and habitat ==
Populations of D. hercules may be found from southern Mexico to Bolivia in mountainous and lowland rain forests. Known populations include the Lesser Antilles, Trinidad and Tobago, Brazil, Ecuador, Colombia, and Peru. Chromosomal analysis has shown that the genus Dynastes originated from South America.

== Life cycle ==
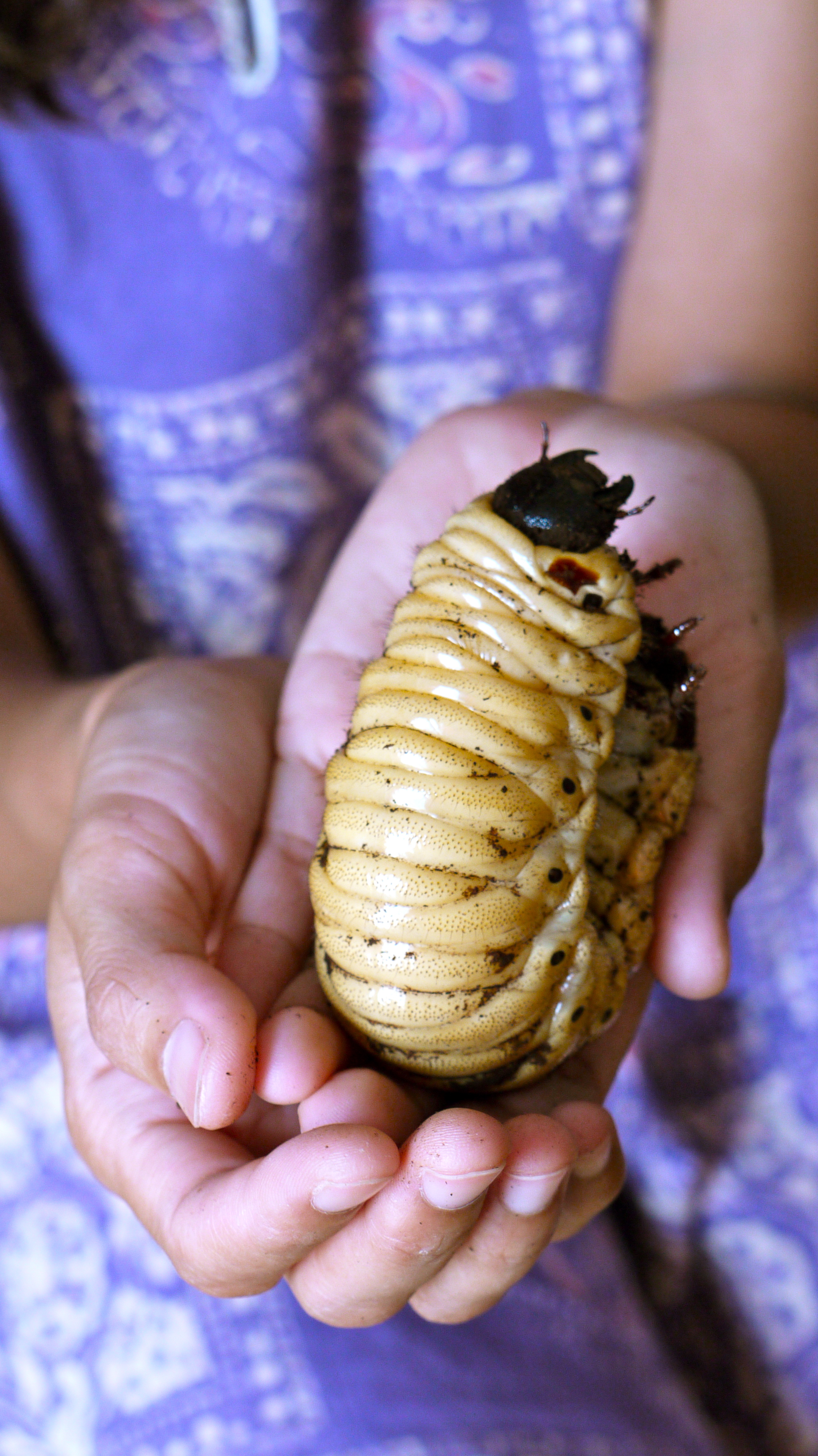
The Larva of D. hercules is among the largest in any insect.

Not much is known about the life cycle in the wild, but much evidence has been gained through observations of captive-bred populations. The mating season for adults typically occurs during the rainy season (July to December). Females have an average gestation period of 30 days from copulation to egg-laying, and may lay up to 100 eggs on the ground or on dead wood. The eggs have an incubation period of approximately 27.7 days before they hatch. Once hatched, the larval stage of the Hercules beetle may last up to two years in duration, where it will go through 3 metamorphosis stages, also known as instars. The larvae have a yellow body with a black head. The larvae can grow up to 11 cm (4.5 in) in length and weigh more than 100 grams. In laboratory conditions at 25 ± 1°C, the first instar stage lasts an average of 50 days, the second stage an average of 56 days, and the third an average of 450 days. After the third instar stage, the pupal stage lasts about 32 days, where it will transition into an adult. Adult beetles can live for three to six months in captivity.

== Diet and behavior ==
=== Diet ===
The larvae of the Hercules beetle are saproxylophagous, meaning that they feed on rotting wood; they reside in same during their two-year developmental stage. The adult Hercules beetle feeds on fresh and rotting fruit, along with tree sap. Adults carve bark through the use of their synchronous mandibles to easily access the sap of trees. When these mandibles are closed, a narrow opening is formed which can act like a straw to allow consumption of tree sap. They have been observed feeding on peaches, pears, apples, grapes, bananas, and mangoes in captivity.

=== Behavior ===
Within their native rain forest habitats, the adult beetles, which are nocturnal, forage for fruit at night and hide or burrow within the leaf litter during the day. The adult D. hercules beetles are capable of creating a 'huffing' sound, generated by stridulating their abdomen against their elytra to serve as a warning to predators. Like most insects, communication within the species is a mix of chemoreception, sight, and mechanical perception. Experiments on D. hercules have shown that a male placed in the vicinity of a female will immediately orient towards her and seek her out, suggesting chemical communication through strong sexual pheromones.

=== Combat behavior between males ===
It has been observed in wild habitat and in captivity that male D. hercules will engage in combat to win possession and mating rights to a female. Male Hercules beetles typically use their large horns to settle mating disputes; these fights can cause significant physical damage to the combatants but may also include possible damage to the female in the process. During fights, the males attempt to grab and pin their rival between the cephalic and thoracic horns to lift and throw them. The successful male wins mating rights with the female, though the beetles remain polygynandrous.

=== Physical strength ===
Actual measurements on a much smaller (and relatively stronger: see square-cube law) species of rhinoceros beetle show a carrying capacity only up to 100 times their body mass, at which point they can barely move.

== Relationship to humans ==
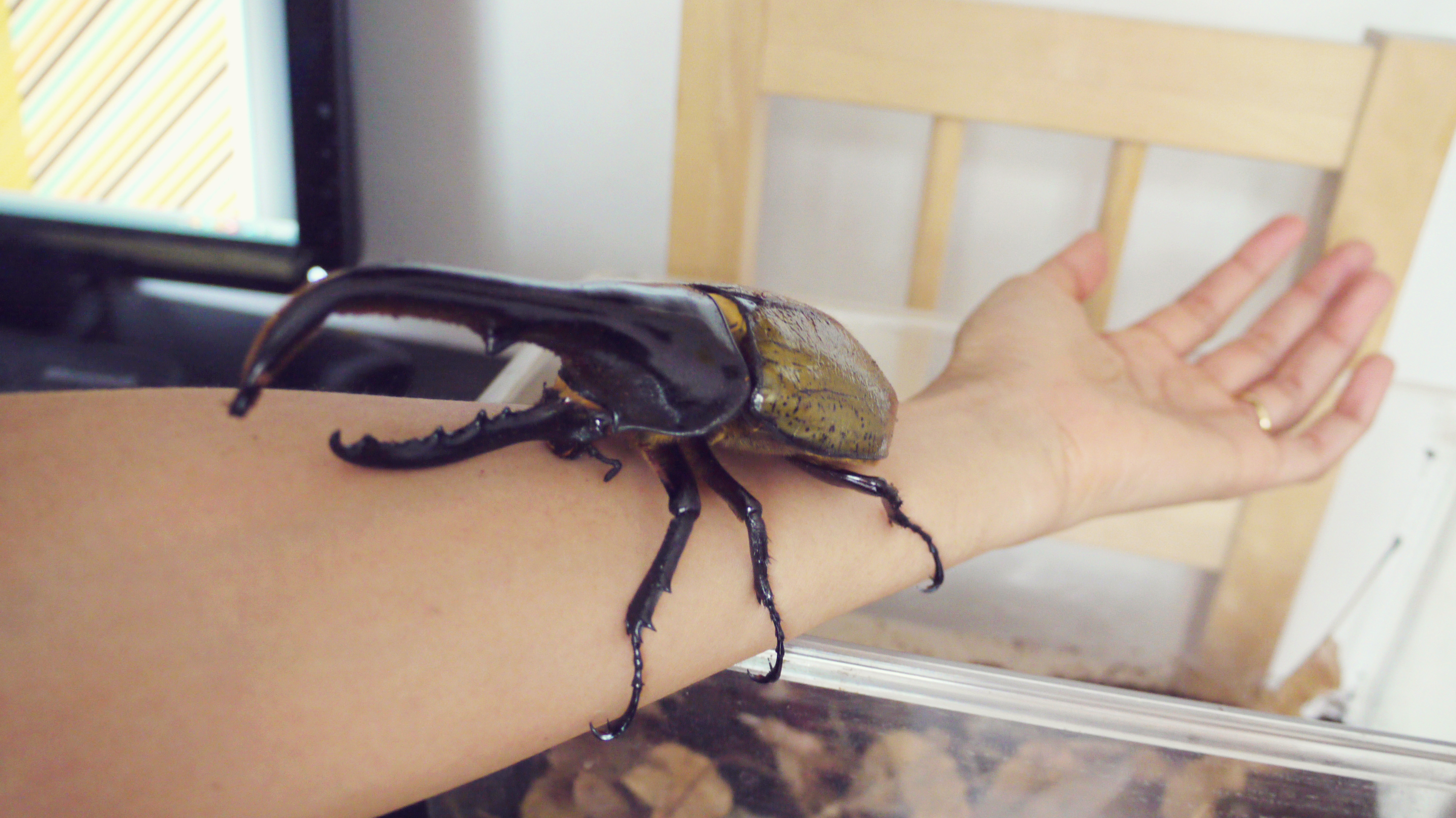
A human with a Hercules beetle

Dynastes hercules does not negatively affect human activities, either as an agricultural pest or disease vector. The beetles can be kept as pets. Larvae excrement has been shown to contain β-mannanase, a bacterially synthesized enzyme that hydrolyzes hemicellulose that can be used in enzyme based cleaning products. β-mannanase has been successfully extracted and cloned from larvae fecal matter, suggesting that production of bio additive cleaning products may be feasible.

== Relationship to the environment ==
Dynastes hercules is a beneficial contributor to the forest ecosystem, primarily during their larval stage where they are saproxylophagous. Feeding on rotting wood assists with biodegradation and cycling nutrients in the environment.

== Be-Kuwa Records (Updated) ==
Dynastes Hercules Hercules- 184.3mm (2025)

Dynastes Hercules Ecuatorianus- 162.6mm (2008)

Dynastes Hercules Occidentales- 164.2mm (2019)

Dynastes Hercules Septentrionalis- 155.1mm (2021)

Dynastes Hercules Takakuwai- 142.1mm (2011)

Dynastes Hercules Trinidadensis- 154.4mm (2013)

Dynastes Hercules Paschoali- 149.0mm (2022)

Dynastes Hercules Morishimai- 143.2mm (2019)

Dynastes Hercules Lichyi- 180.7mm (2022)

Dynastes Hercules Baudrii- 113.6mm (2023)

== Be-Kuwa Records (Small-Updated) ==
Dynastes Hercules Hercules- 46.3mm (2018)

Dynastes Hercules Reidi- 45.0mm (2008)

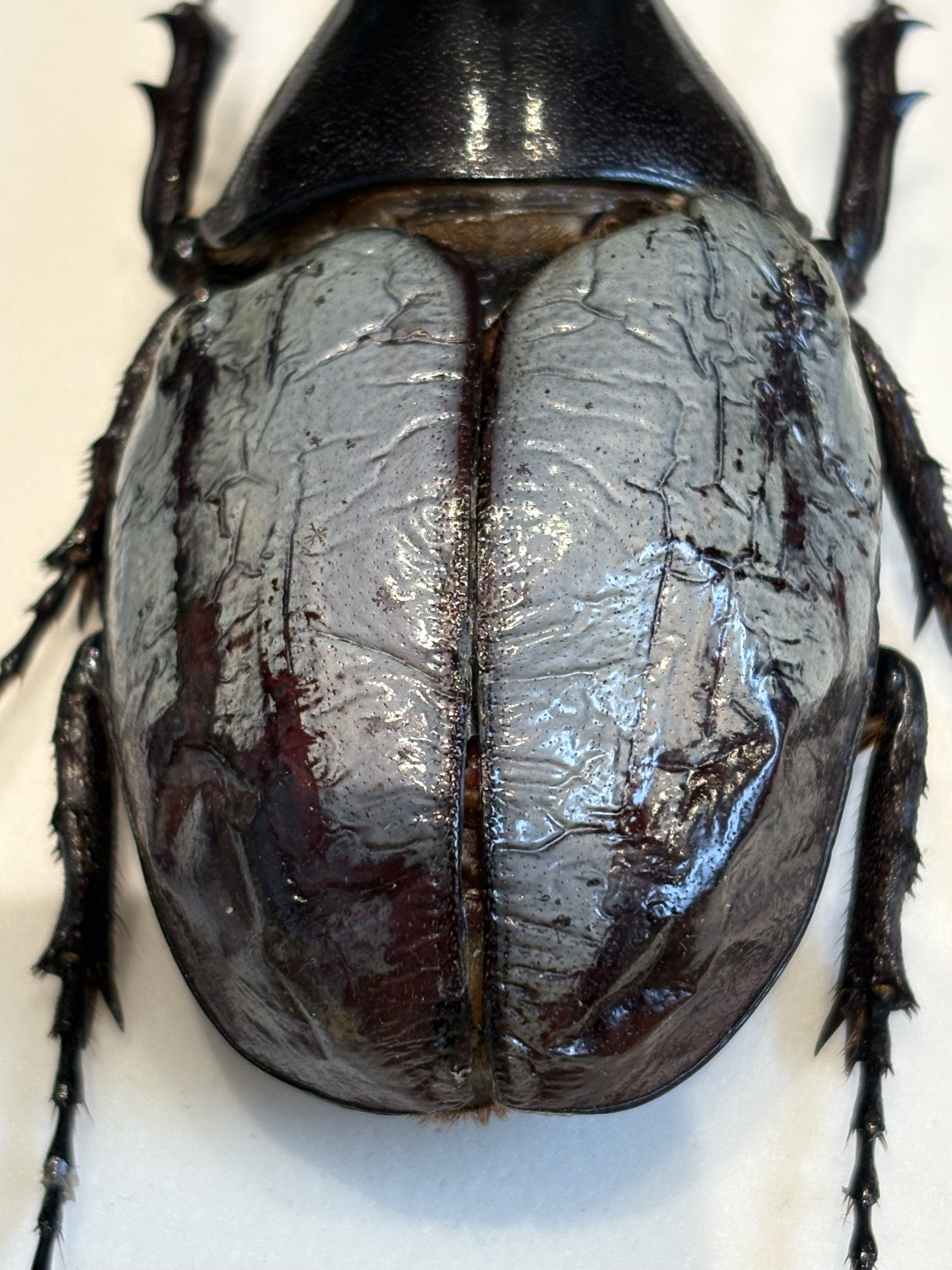
Blue Hercules Beetle

== See also ==
- List of largest insects
