= Gosh =

Gosh or GOSH may refer to:

== People ==
=== Surnames ===
- Efrat Gosh (born 1983), Israeli singer-songwriter
- Mkhitar Gosh, Armenian scholar and priest
- Salah Gosh, National Security Advisor for Sudan

=== Given named, nicknamed ===
- Lord Gosh, British rapper
- Gosh Dilay (born 1985), Filipino musician

=== Fictional characters ===
- Rogan Gosh (comics), a comic book character

== Places ==
- Gosh, Armenia, a town in Tavush Province of Armenia
- Monastery of Gosh, Gosh, Armenia
- Great Ormond Street Hospital, a children's hospital in London, England

=== Fictional places ===
- Gosh, a fictional kingdom described in the book The Glugs of Gosh, written by C. J. Dennis

== Other uses ==
- Gosh Enterprises, a U.S. food services company
- GOSH!, a 1978-79 Los Angeles magazine
- Gosh (song), a 2015 song by Jamie xx from In Colour
- Mkhitar Gosh Medal of Armenia for public service
- A minced oath for god

== See also ==
- Gosh darn
- Ghosh, an Indian surname
- Gôh, Côte d'Ivoire
- Gosha (disambiguation)
- God (disambiguation)
- OMG (disambiguation)
- Oh my gosh (disambiguation)
