= Conservation and restoration of road vehicles =

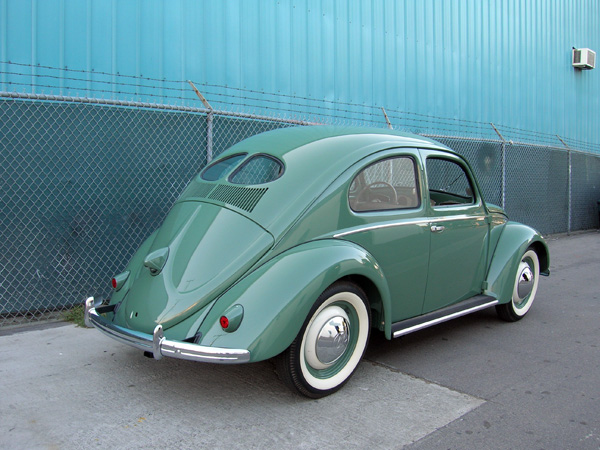
Restored 1949 VW Bug/Beetle

Conservation and restoration of road vehicles is the process of restoring a vehicle back to its original working condition. Vehicles, whether partially scrapped or completely totaled, are typically restored to maintain their roadworthiness or to preserve those with antique status for use as showpieces.

Bus preservation groups aim to purchase buses of various eras to restore them to their original operating condition. Buses are often restored to the original authentic livery of their original owner.

Restoration means removing, replacing, or repairing the parts of a vehicle, while preservation means keeping the original components. Though automotive restoration is commonly defined as the reconditioning of a vehicle "from original condition in an effort to return it to like-new or better condition," There are many styles of which a vehicle can be restored, any of which can be performed at the discretion, desire, or taste of a vehicle owner or restorer.

There are different levels of automotive repair. The highest quality level, generally unobtainable for the amateur restorer, is the Concours d'Elegance level; these are cars that are frequently restomoded to a degree often beyond the quality that they were when they left the factory. There are virtually no deficiencies in the quality of the parts that were actually restored. Those parts that did not come on the car as it was first sold must have the highest level of fit and finish, and appear to have been original parts. Many Concours cars are not driven except for the short distances from their trailers to the show field. For example, the guidelines of the Antique Automobile Club of America (AACA) are to "evaluate an antique vehicle, which has been restored to the same state as the dealer could have prepared the vehicle for delivery to the customer." Only when a car is completely placed back into the condition it was first sold in is it considered to be restored. Various aspects of a car may be repaired without the car being restored. A car that does not run can be repaired to running condition, but that simply means it will now run and does not mean that any part of the car has been restored. Automotive Restoration means that the car was put back into the condition it was first sold as. Anything else is either repair or resto-mod. Between these two extremes are the vast bulk of cars that are seen as drivers, neighborhood show cars, and 20-footers—in that they look great from 20 feet (6 m) away. Many value guides offer six levels of quality, from a "parts-only" car to the best at "Number 1"—absolutely perfect in every way.

A full car restoration can take many years and can cost tens of thousands of dollars, often well in excess of what the finished value of the car will be. Many jobs will have to be farmed out to specialty shops—those with the special knowledge and equipment to do the job. Often a restoration once started is left unfinished and the car and parts can be purchased for a fraction of their worth. However, if a person buys an unfinished project, it is imperative to be sure that all of the parts are there. Finding parts for an orphan or rare car can sometimes be impossible. This necessitates the fabrication of parts from scratch, generally at great effort and expense.

There are help sources, books, and magazines (Skinned Knuckles in the US or Practical Classics in the UK, for example) to assist with restoration of an entire car or specific parts.

== Road vehicle restoration styles ==
=== Concours d'Elegance ===
While the event known as Concours d' Elegance is an "invitation only" show of prestigious automobiles, the term "Concours d'Elegance Ready" Automobiles refers to the highest level of auto restoration. To term a restored car a "Concours d'Elegance Ready Automobile", or, "Concours Ready" for short, doesn't necessarily mean it will be exhibited and judged in Concours d'Elegance Events. The term is rather used to provide a comprehensive understanding of what level of automobile restoration has been completed on a car, or, what level of restoration on a car is underway by a very experienced Master Craftsperson in Automobile Restoration. This highest level of Restoration is distinguished from "Traditional Restoration" because a Concours Ready Car far exceeds the quality of the original manufacturer in its original debut day, because, the high standards set by judges at Concours D'Elegance events worldwide, demand that not a scratch or nick be found on even a single nut or bolt in the car being exhibited, as one example. A Concours d'Elegance level restoration means incredible handcrafting has gone into the lengthy and detailed restorative process, using minimalist filler, as another example of what separates this Arete Level of Restoration, from Traditional Automobile Restoration.

=== Traditional ===
Traditional restoration is characterized as returning a vehicle back to its original condition or better "in an effort to return it to like-new or better condition ... can be refurbished using either original or reproduction parts and techniques." Traditional restorations can be performed with a focus to completely restore or to preserve as many original components as possible throughout the course of the restoration. Steve Segal, owner, and restorer of a 1972 Pontiac Trans Am 455 H.O. explains the differences between the two methods when describing his project in a High-Performance Pontiac magazine article: "'This was not a restoration in the traditional sense of diagnosing and disassemble, bag and tag all part so you know where they go, if possible take a picture before you remove the part and put it in the part bag, strip them, sanitize them, fix them, repaint them, and put them all back together,' he says. 'It was a restoration with a preservation focus. It was done from an archaeological perspective. The ultimate goal was to put forth the maximum effort toward uncovering, referencing, documenting, and preserving any and all existing components and finishes.'"

Muscle Car Restorations of Chippewa Falls, Wisconsin, also took a similar approach when performing the restoration of a 1969 Ford Mustang Boss 429 described in an article series published in Car Craft Magazine: "While not completely unmolested, it was very close. So much so that the decision was made to preserve as much of it as possible rather than to just tear it down, strip it, and start from scratch." These levels of preservation of originality within antique vehicle restorations has proven to accrue more value than some fully restored vehicles at auction in recent years.

The process of restoring some particularly rare antique vehicles back to their overall original showroom floor condition has become increasingly difficult over time due to the diminishing of resources, parts, and tools. Some parts may not be available to replace or to imitate via fabrication for some rare and antique vehicles unless proper research is performed. This is one reason why preservation has become such a primary objective in many restorations, particularly of rare antique vehicles, in order to preserve the historical aspects of the vehicle, its components, and the processes of its original assembly.

=== Resto-modification ===
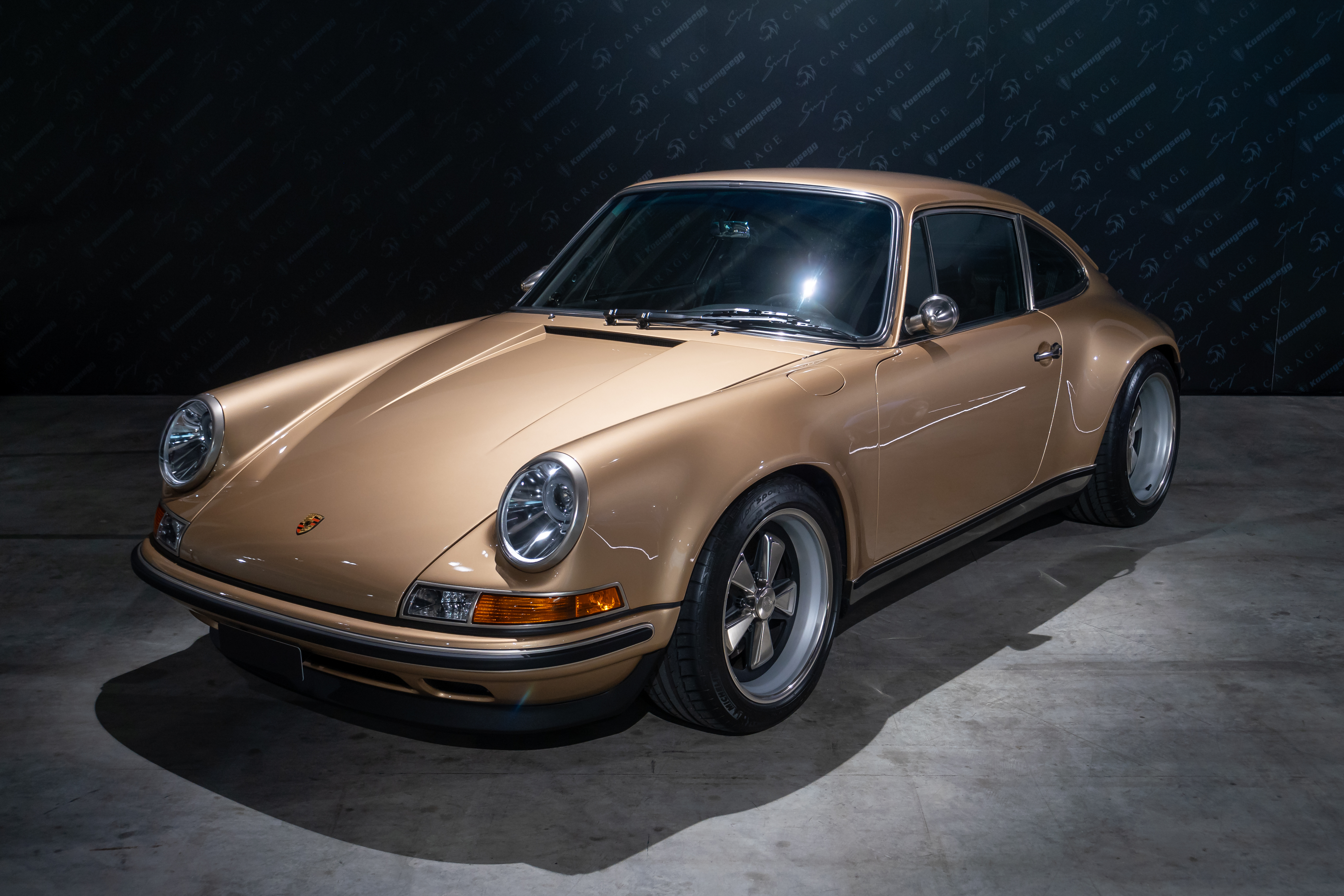
Singer Classic Study, a resto-modded Porsche 964 with Porsche 911 classic design elements

A non-original restored car may be termed a "restomod." Resto-modification, also known as resto-modding, is when "an old car [is] modernize[d] with an updated engine, suspension, brakes, tires and[/or] electronics. And if you resto-mod the right way, you can revert back to stock at any time." Stock condition is defined as "A vehicle that has not been modified and is in the same configuration as it came from the factory." Upgrades that are easily reversible to the original stock condition, or changes that were available options when the vehicle was first sold, are less likely to be controversial. Less acceptable to the classic car market may be major alterations like engine swaps or gearbox transplants, which would be more like hot rodding.

Various reasons for performing resto-modifications on vintage cars may include the owner's desire to have either modern conveniences, improvements in vehicle safety or reliability, and/or improvements in street or track-driving performance. Resto-modifications for modern convenience may include adding features such as air conditioning, power windows, power steering, power brakes, seatbelts, or radio/stereo systems that may have not come installed on a vehicle at the time it was originally produced. Safety upgrades may include newer safety components such as seat belts, brakes or using relays to reduce electric current flowing through light switches. Usability upgrades include fitting intermittent wipers, an alternator instead of a dynamo, or electronic ignition system instead of contact breaker points ignition system. Emissions upgrades include hardened valve seats to use standard unleaded fuel, or retrofitted catalytic converters.

As an example of resto-modding, Kevin Young owns and resto-modded his 1970 Ford Torino Brougham 429 Cobra Jet, in an article published by Car Craft magazine, "...Young noticed some unusual valvetrain noise. While it turns out a set of lifters would've cured the problem, in the best hot rodder tradition, Young saw it as an opportunity to tear down the motor and build something better. The goal was a reliable, street-friendly, pump-gas engine that was capable of easy 12s on street tires, all the while retaining a factory restored appearance—including iron intake and exhaust manifolds." Young accomplished this by doing a performance rebuild of the original engine and modifying the original differential, while preserving and/or restoring much of the car's other original components.

According to Young, many enthusiasts were displeased with the changes and felt that his modifications compromised the originality of the extremely rare car, being one of three built like it. Though many enthusiasts within the auto restoration and preservation community feel this way about resto-modding, many others endorse it, such as TV personality and car collector Jay Leno: "Some purists object to changing or modifying these old cars. I look at it this way: If it makes the car better, safer, more reliable and faster—and you can change it back to stock whenever you want—why not do it."

Depending upon how appropriate the upgrades are considered by other owners of the same model, this may reduce or enhance the value of the car. If the car is in regular use, non-original upgrades are likely to be more acceptable; if the car is a stored collector's piece, originality would be more important. It is important as a restorer or owner to know what is acceptable to the potential market for the finished car, in order not to de-value it.

=== Replicas ===
A replica, re-creation, or tribute is "A vehicle that has been modified to appear like another car or truck entirely, or like a more desirable version of that same vehicle." Replica restorations are often performed by enthusiasts who want to imitate specific rare or famous vehicles, such as one from a particular movie or TV show. One such example is Trey Gee and his 1970 Pontiac LeMans published in High-Performance Pontiac magazine, which has been restored to replicate a much rarer Pontiac GTO Judge of the same year, a car which has recorded "auction sale prices [peaking] at well over $300,000." Trey is quoted in the article saying "I really wanted a classic GTO, but with the power, ride, and comfort to rival modern cars—a great car to drive. At the same time, I didn't want to heavily modify an original GTO or Judge and put lots of miles on it, because I would feel guilty for depreciating a piece of history, so I decided that a tribute car built as a resto-mod would be my best choice."

Some individuals within the auto enthusiast community disapprove of replica restorations due to the prior cases in which some individuals performing said restorations, such as turning a 1967 Pontiac LeMans into a replication of a Pontiac GTO of the same year, a rarer model, and fraudulently selling it advertised as the rarer and more sought after model with the higher price tag.

=== Preservation of exterior wear ===
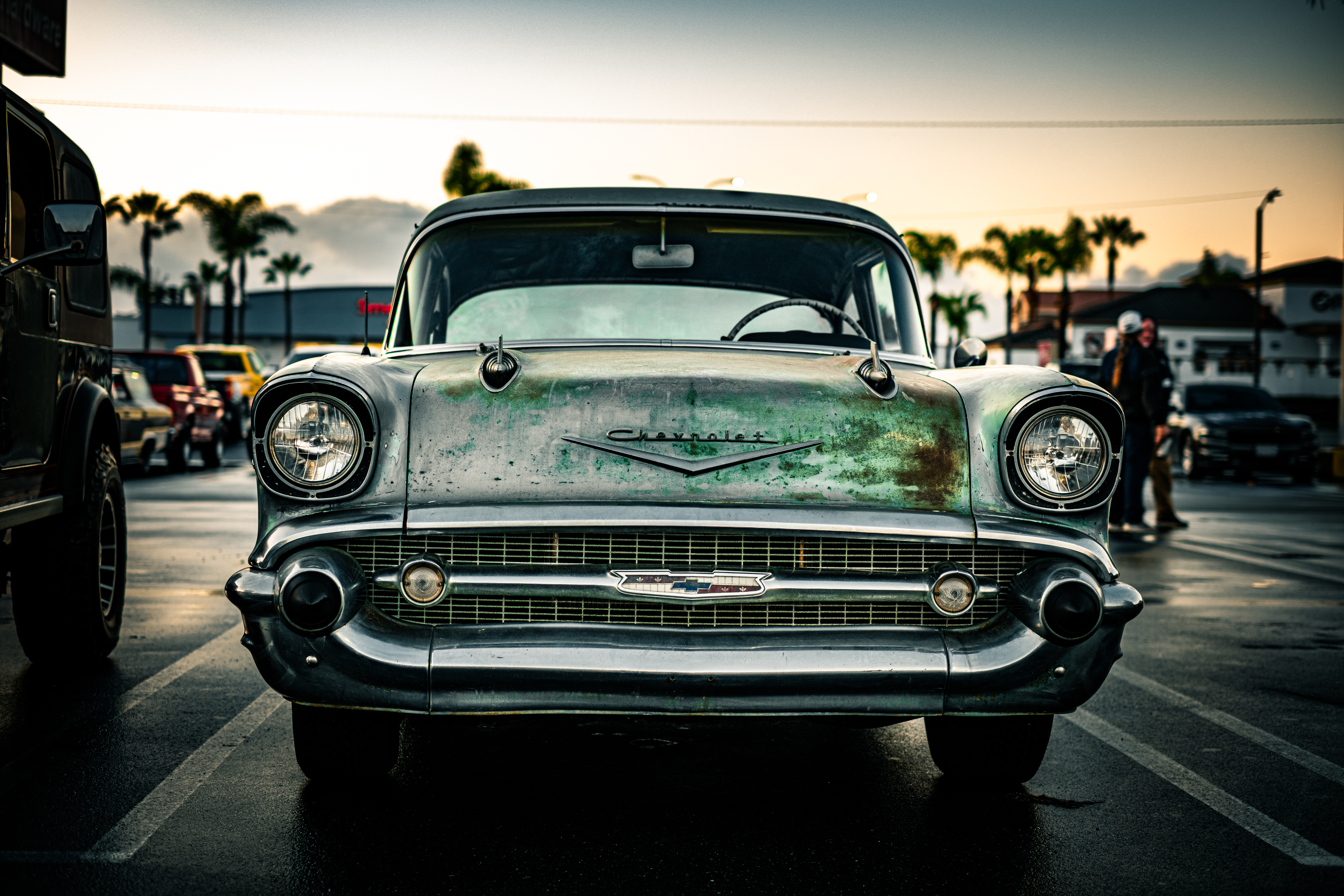
A mechanically restored 1957 Chevrolet retaining its original paint and finishes, with visible age, oxidation, and signs of use.

Preservation of exterior wear is characterized as leaving an antique car's body and paint unrestored and in an 'as-is' condition, or by preserving patina. Patina describes a vehicle's exterior which has "a natural finish that embraces the years of wear, tear, and repair a vehicle has earned during decades of service." Vintage vehicles with patina are often "Valued for their originality and historical significance, not for the quality of restoration." David Gooding, founder and president of Gooding & Company classic car auctions describes patina as "the fingerprints of the manufacturers there, and the owner. You look at a car with great patina and you know it has a character like nothing else. It's got a personality, a unique personality, and when you see those cars get restored – they just totally lose it. It all gets cleansed and cleaned off and buffed and then it's just like everything else, and back down to a level."

Examples of this style of preservation/restoration include Steven Henderson's 1928 Ford Model A published in Hemmings Motor News magazine, along with Matt Tucker's 1960 Ford F-100 published in Diesel Power magazine. Henderson bought his 1928 Ford with 80 years of body and paint wear but decided only to bring the vehicle back to running condition and left the exterior as it was. Henderson's reason for doing so, according to him, was in order to preserve its character and originality. Tucker bought his 1960 Ford pickup with decades of wear and discoloration, but according to him, he decided it was best to preserve its imperfection by covering it with a preserving clear coat.

== Ground-up restoration ==
There are many restoration facilities in existence offering a broad range and quality of services. Some businesses focus their work on only specific components, such as engines, gas tanks, clocks, or chromed parts. Others perform complete restoration or remanufacture of virtually any car including any of its components. This includes restoration to a finished factory level or better-than-factory condition. Some businesses have the capacity to restore and fabricate all components in-house coupled with the ability to recreate a car no matter what state of decay it is in (or literally how much of the car remains, sometimes as little as a single fender remains and nothing else). There are also restoration services provided by the original manufacturers, such as Ferrari and Aston Martin.

=== Process ===
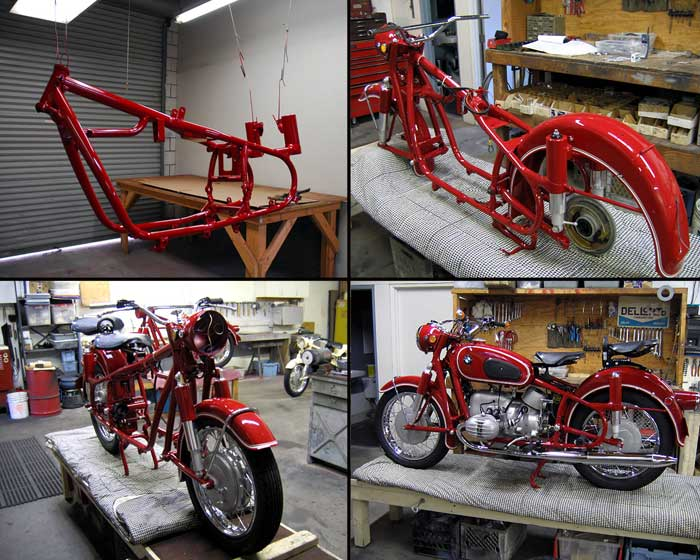
A BMW R60/2 motorcycle undergoing a frame-up Concours restoration

Restoration of a vehicle refers to the process of restoring a vehicle to its original condition. Neither updating nor modifying are considered part of the restoration process. A restored car is one that has had all of its systems and/or parts restored to original condition. Selectively restoring parts or systems is referred to as refurbishing. It does not qualify as restoration. Rebuilding an engine may restore that engine, but it does not restore the car, or entitle the car to be called a restoration.

There are many aspects to the process of vehicle restoration. The goal is to return the vehicle to its 'original' state. To accomplish this, a vehicle must often undergo many structural and aesthetic changes.

A complete restoration includes not only repair of the parts that can be seen – the body, trim, chrome, wheels, and the passenger compartment – but also the components that are not necessarily visible or otherwise evident, including the engine and engine compartment, trunk, frame, driveline, and all ancillary parts like the brakes, accessories, engine cooling system, electrical system, etc. Repairs are made to correct obvious problems, as well as for cosmetic reasons. For example, even if a wheel is covered by a full hubcap and not seen, and is structurally sound, it should have the tire unmounted and any required repairs performed such as rust removal, straightening, priming, and painting.

A car that has had its bodywork restored to as new condition but has undergone some modifications elsewhere is either a modified car or a resto-mod car, neither being completely restored nor completely modified. If a car has had an engine swap for other than the original model, that car has not been restored. Although most of the parts are original, it qualifies as modified rather than restored.

=== Disassembly ===
The first project is disassembly. The car is taken apart and the chassis is inspected. The chassis must be in order as it is the structural foundation of the vehicle. The next tasks are typically the vehicle's engine and mechanisms. The restorer will mechanically bring the vehicle into working order before aesthetically restoring the interior and exterior of the vehicle. Once the vehicle is mechanically functional the body work is then done to the car. Once the exterior restoration is completed, the last task is the interior finish. The restoration of the car is complete when the interior restoration is completed.

A complete auto restoration could include total removal of the body, engine, driveline components and related parts from the car, total disassembly, cleaning and repairing of each of the major parts and its components, replacing broken, damaged or worn parts and complete re-assembly and testing. As part of the restoration, each part must be thoroughly examined, cleaned and repaired, or if repair of the individual part would be too costly, replaced (assuming correct, quality parts are available) as necessary to return the entire automobile to "as first sold" condition.

All of the parts showing wear or damage that were originally painted are typically stripped of old paint, with any rust or rust related damage repaired, dents and ripples removed and then the metal refinished, primed and painted with colors to match the original factory colors. Wooden parts should go through the same meticulous inspection and repair process with regluing, replacement of rotted or termite-damaged wood, sealing and refinishing to match the factory specifications. Pressure treatment with preservative may be considered to safeguard against future wood rot. Chrome and trim may require stripping and repair/refinishing. Fasteners with tool marks, damaged threads, or corrosion need re-plating or replacement-unless the car was originally sold that way. The frame must be thoroughly cleaned and repaired if necessary. Often abrasive blasting of the frame is the most expeditious method of cleaning, but it may still leave microscopic rust pitting behind, so should be followed up with a phosphoric acid 'rust killer' solution, before priming. Abrasive blasting using less abrasive soda or crushed walnut shells is less likely than sandblasting to cause damage to fragile items, while still removing corrosion. Acid tank dipping of the frame and or body followed by an E-coat primer after repairs is recognized as the most effective but also most expensive way to get rid of rust and to protect against future corrosion. The chassis frame should be properly coated for rust protection to at least match the standard of the original, to the highest modern standard would safeguard the time and money invested in the restoration.

=== Interior restoration ===
Interior restoration is the process of returning the inside of the vehicle to its original factory state. Often a vehicle’s interior must be need to be completely stripped out before restoration can occur. This is because deterioration over time that can leave materials like wood, cloth or leather in unusable condition. Also abandoned vehicles have the potential to contain biohazardous material within the cabin caused by decay and habitation by animals. Often seating will be stripped to the wire framing before being stuffed and upholstered. The seat is still considered to be authentic after undergoing this process. Other areas of interior restoration include replaced instrument paneling, car radios, flooring and wooden paneling

All mechanical and electronic equipment such as a speedometer, gas gauge, air bags and other equipment necessary to the safe operation of the vehicle must be inspected. The vehicle interior is considered restored when it is returned the state of function and aesthetic the car was in after its manufacture

The interior of the vehicle should be examined and repaired or replaced to match those that were available from the factory. The seats must be repaired before being re-upholstered and the coil springs repaired, replaced, or retired. The instrument panel or dashboard contains a number of gauges, each of which has to be inspected and cleaned, repaired, or replaced to be brought back to both operational and cosmetic standards of the car when it was first sold.

Developments in technology have made it possible to salvage the original automobile's interior by various restoration processes. Examples of this include leather seat, dash, console, steering wheel, door panel, and trim repair, as well as re-dyeing.

=== Exterior restoration ===
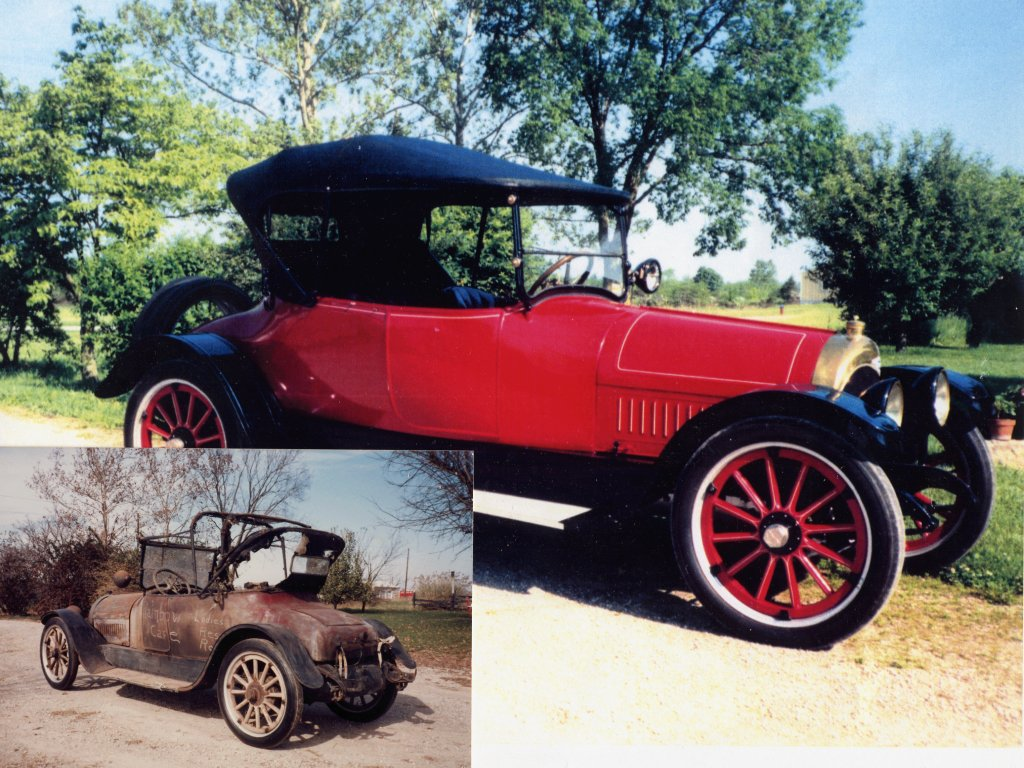
Apperson: Before and after

Restoration of a vehicle’s exterior can take many forms. A vehicle that has been left unmaintained will often accumulate rust over time. Sometimes this rust deterioration can render an exterior part unusable. In which case a replacement part like a fender, front grill or door mirror must be purchased outright from an external source. If rust damage is minor however the part will undergo rust repair. This is the process of removing rust from metal and returning structural integrity. This is accomplished by removing the rust through sanding or blasting to get down to bare metal. Then new sheet metal or fiberglass is applied to the affected area. Finally the piece is worked until smooth, primed and re-painted.

Other materials like glass and weather stripping must be replaced as they become damaged over time. Factors like weather erosion can lead to faded and broken glass as well as dried out weather stripping. Another typical area of exterior repair is dent removal. This entails taking the original metal and re-working it to remove dents and other such blemishes. Professionals often use hammer and dolly work to remove dents. This involves placing the dented metal piece over a curved metal dolly and using an electric or manual hammer to remove the dent and smooth the metal. Often, vehicles require plastic headlight restoration as headlights can become foggy over time due to weathering. In a complete restoration, the repair and refinishing of the car's body and frame must again go through the careful inspection and subsequent repair and recoating as necessary to bring the car to as first sold condition.

As part of the automotive restoration process, repair of the car's frame is important since it serves as the foundation for the entire car. The frame should be inspected for straightness, twisting, alignment, rust damage, stress fractures, collision damage and condition of the mounting points for the body, suspension, and other components. Any problems must be repaired, which can be a costly process. For many popular cars, replacement frames can be purchased from parts suppliers specializing in that make of vehicle. This is often a better option than investing money into a severely damaged frame. Depending on the frame construction, mud and water can make their way inside the frame and cause rusting from the inside out, so it can be seriously weakened with little or no external sign. This, and the fact that many replacement chassis/frames are galvanised, provides sound additional reasons to consider a replacement frame.

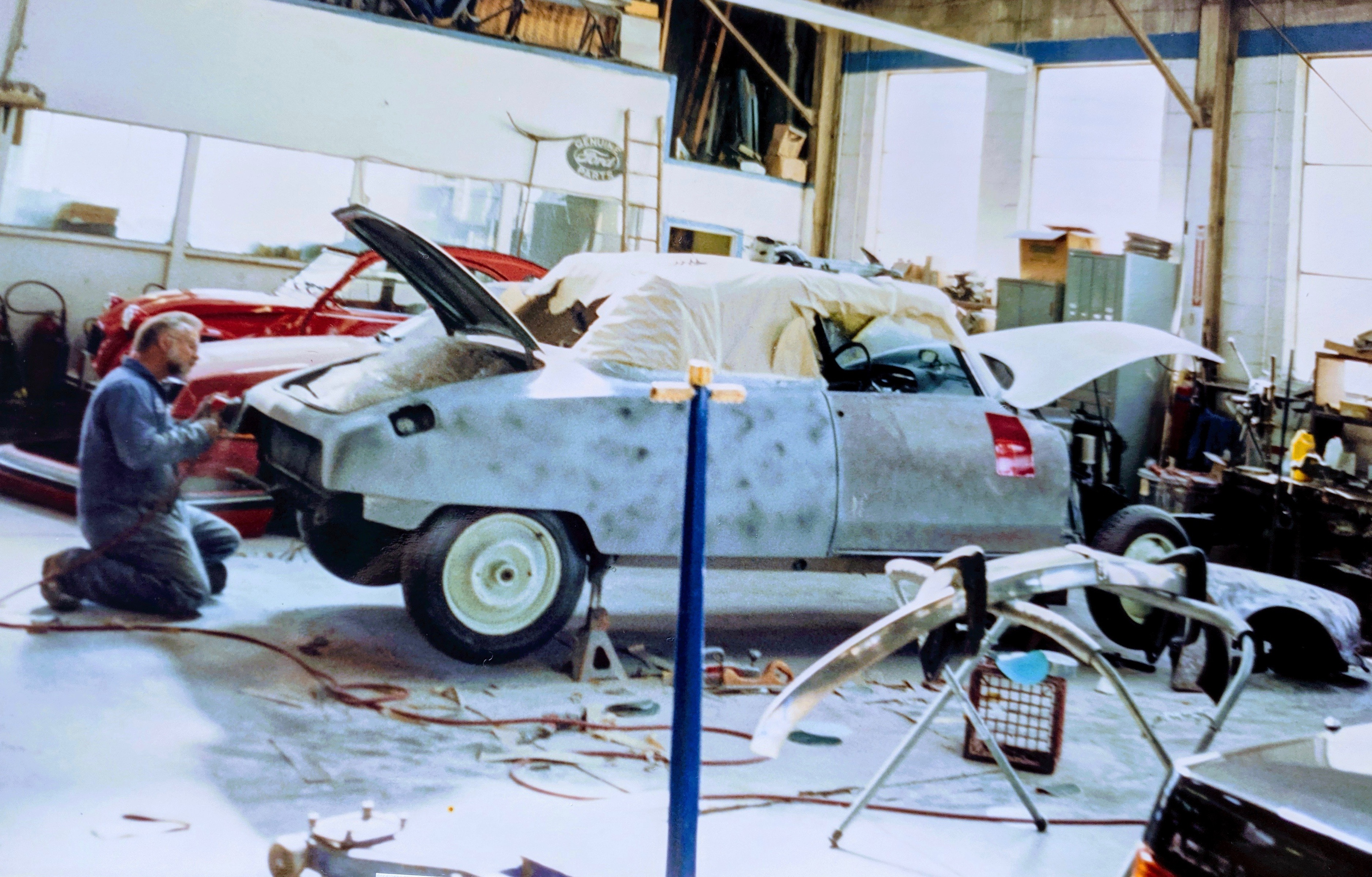
1964 Citroën DS Décapotable Usine under restoration in Oakland, California

If rust is present on a body panel, the panel was damaged by a collision, or other damage is present, there are several options for repair: fix the damaged panel (minor damage), replacement (excessively damaged panels), or cutting out and replacing a portion of the panel (moderate damage—for many makes of vintage car, small partial patch panels are available and designed to be welded into place after the damaged portions are cut out). Although this may seem simple in principle, in practice it is highly skilled work. One of the highest skills in restoration is the use of the English Wheel or Wheeling Machine to fabricate complete compound curvature panels from scratch. Many panels, (especially if from different sources), may be a problem to fit together and need reshaping to fit together properly. Variation in panel size and shape and 'fettling' by skilled metalworkers on the factory production line to make panels fit well used to be common practice, especially with British and Italian sports cars. Even genuine New Old Stock factory panels may require panel beating skills to fit.

The re-installation of the repaired or renewed panels requires that the panels be trial fitted and aligned, to check their fit, that their shape 'flows' and the gaps between panels are correct. Consistent gaps are very important to a quality finish. Gapping gauges are available for this. The doors, hood, and trunk should open and close properly, and there should be no interference or rubbing. Steel or aluminum door skins and wing/fender edges can generally be adjusted with a hammer and dolly, in extreme cases a pulsed MIG weld bead on a panel edge, that is shaped with a grinder and file, can be a good solution. At one time it was common practice to use lead loading to achieve tight panel gaps, especially in the coachbuilding business, but also on the production line. Lead loading is highly skilled and requires safety precautions because ingested lead or fumes are toxic. The panels have to 'look right' together. This is a process of repeated adjustment because the adjustment of one panel often affects the apparent fit of another. If there are multiple styling lines on the side of a car, it is generally best to align doors on the most prominent one. When the panels on the car are satisfactory, they should be primed and painted a correct historical color for the vehicle if the restoration is striving for historical accuracy. An owner might want to have the car painted to look like a particular specialty vehicle such as a police car, or a delivery van painted to look like it would have in grandfather's company colors, etc. Individual painting of the panels is generally the correct approach, as this will result in all parts of the panel being painted as opposed to partially re-assembling and then painting, leaving parts of the assembly that are touching or "blind" unpainted. It is useful to mark in some way, if possible, where the panels fit before removal for painting, to aid re-fitting. The separate painting approach should also result in no overspray on other parts of them since they will not be in the car at that point. It is important when re-assembling painted panels to be aware that the paint is at its thinnest, and most easily damaged on corners, edges, and raised styling lines, and to take extra care with them, such as temporarily taping with masking tape. This is also important when using ultra fine wet flatting paper before polishing, (or when using an electric polishing mop) for the best mirror-like finish.

Colors and treatments applied to the panels from the factory should be considered. Although more original looking, period enamel or cellulose paint will be less capable of protecting the car bodywork than modern paints. A car's owner may wish to have a panel or portion of the car entirely painted when in fact it may have come from the factory with undercoating or other coating applied to one side, which may be less attractive than a smoothly finished and painted panel. In other cases, the owner might paint or plate a collection of small parts to look similar for a better appearance, when the factory might have installed these as many different colors since the factory's prime concern was a balance between function and cost and not the appearance of unseen areas. Given the cost of restoration, it makes sense to many owners to upgrade the corrosion protection of paints, underseals, and anti-rust waxes to far above the original factory standard to protect the time and money invested in the restoration. Some owner's feel these improvements would make the car a "Restomod", and not a restoration. The term "Restomod" is not used in the UK.

=== Mechanicals restoration ===
The internal combustion engine requires regular maintenance to ensure its continued function. Engine oil, power steering and brake fluid are examples of engine maintenance that must be kept and checked at regular intervals. Often wear and tear over time can leave an engine totally unusable, in which case the restorer might remove the existing engine and replace it with a similar or modern engine substitute. In order to conduct an engine restoration first a technician will conduct a thorough inspection. Often pre-restored vehicle have engines that have gone without maintenance for years and therefore require engine restoration to return them to working order. The engine is removed from the car and inspected for broken and non-functional parts. Typical parts that require replacing include the pistons, spark plugs, fuel lines, battery, fuses, timing belt and various gaskets. All are subject to deterioration over time. Structural components like the engine block, camshaft and crankshaft are less likely to require repair but not uncommon. Typically, after all required parts are gathered, the disassembled pieces will be cleaned, lubricated (if required), and reassembled. The engine is then replaced within the car.

A mechanic will then perform a series of tests to ensure that the engine is in working, road worthy condition. This is known as a pre-start engine check. First all the lines and hoses are checked for breaks and leaks. Second the radiator is topped off with water to ensure that the system is sealed off. Next the oil level is replenished. Finally the battery charge is checked and the ignition system is inspected. The engine is then ready to be started. The entire engine and all related systems are inspected and whatever is necessary to get them into original presale condition is done. The engine and all of the ancillary components – starter, generator/alternator, radiator, distributor, carburetor and all others – must be inspected and corrected to factory specifications. The engine itself, plus the transmission, clutch, overdrive unit, and even the driveshaft must be meticulously inspected, cleaned, and measured for wear. This will show up as a deviation from original factory specifications. All of the parts – block, crankcase, head, transmission housing, etc. – should be inspected for cracks or other damage. All moving parts – pistons, crankshaft, camshaft, oil pump, bearings and bushings, flywheel, water pump and all others – must be cleaned and measured against factory specifications and, if necessary, machined or re-manufactured to bring them within specifications. The same goes for the transmission, clutch, differential and all other moving parts of the power line and driveline. All of the electrical systems have to be inspected and, if it shows chafing, wear or damage, replaced. If the car is old enough to have used rubber or even fabric-based electrical wiring insulation, this should be replaced with modern insulation because it is a fire risk. Then the entire engine/driveline will have to be reassembled, replacing all worn bearing and bushings, seals, gaskets, belts and gears.

=== Reassembly ===
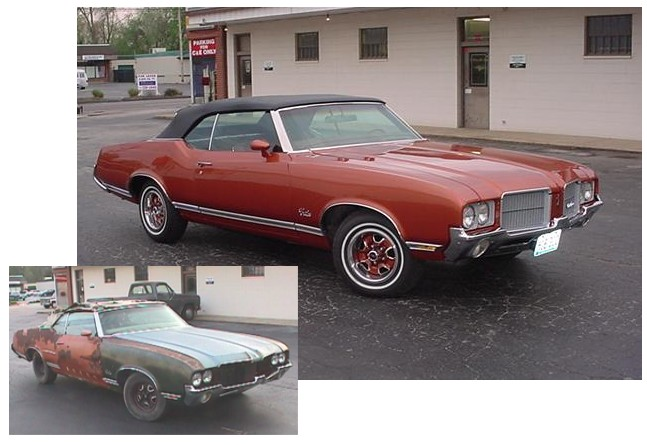
Before and after, 1971 Oldsmobile Cutlass

Finally, the engine/driveline has to be re-installed in the frame, the brakes, wheels and other parts re-installed, the body fitted to the frame and the entire car rechecked and tested.

== Road vehicle conservation ==
Vehicle conservation refers more broadly to the conservation of very old vehicles for the purposes of preserving history, rather than transportation. A mechanic can provide specific instructions on which chemicals to use on older paints and metals in order to preserve the integrity of the frame.

== See also ==
- Antique car – Automobile classed as an antique
- Auto detailing – Activity to clean and maintain a vehicle
- Barn find – Low-quality classic car
- Custom car – Passenger vehicle that has been altered
- Electric vehicle conversion – Changing a combustion automobile into an EV
- Hot rod – American car with a large engine modified for linear speed
- Muscle car – High-performance car
- Rat rod – Style of vehicle customization
- Retrofit – Addition of new technology or features to older systems
- Sodablasting – Abrasive blasting technique using sodium bicarbonate
- Ship of Theseus – Thought experiment about identity over time
- Vintage warbird restoration – Vintage military aircraft operated by civilians
- Automobile engine replacement#EV crate engines
