= Gosha =

Gosha may refer to:

- Somali Bantu
- Hideo Gosha, Japanese film director
- Five Chariots, Chinese constellation
- Gosha woman, women kept in purdah in southern India
- Gosha, the diminutive form of the Russian given name Georgy
- "Gosha", a 2018 song by Snot
- "Gosha Rubchinskiy", a Russian designer clothing brand
- Gosha, a fictional character in the 2019 Indian animated series Chacha Chaudhary
- Gosha, a pet Caracal that appears in multiple memes of Big Floppa.

== See also ==
- Gosh (disambiguation)
- Ghosh, an Indian surname
