= Lucy Wills =

British physician and hematologist (1888-1964)

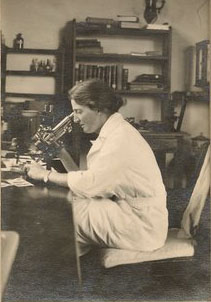
- Wills in an undated photo
- Born: 10 May 1888; Sutton Coldfield, England, U.K.
- Died: 26 April 1964 (aged 75); Canterbury, England, U.K.
- Education: Cheltenham Ladies' College; Newnham College; London School of Medicine for Women
- Occupation: Haematologist
- Known for: Pregnancy research

Lucy Wills, LRCP (10 May 1888 – 26 April 1964) was an English haematologist and physician researcher. She conducted seminal work in India in the late 1920s and early 1930s on macrocytic anaemia of pregnancy. Her observations led to her discovery of a nutritional factor in yeast which both prevents and cures this disorder. Macrocytic anaemia is characterized by enlarged red blood cells and is life-threatening. Poor pregnant women in the tropics with inadequate diets are particularly susceptible. The nutritional factor identified by Lucy Wills (the 'Wills factor') was subsequently shown to be folate, the naturally occurring form of folic acid.

== Early life ==
Generations of the Wills family had been living in or near Birmingham, a city known as "the workshop of the world" for its many factories and industry. Lucy Wills was born on 10 May 1888 in nearby Sutton Coldfield. Her paternal great-grandfather, William Wills, had been a prosperous attorney from a Nonconformist Unitarian family (see Church of the Messiah, Birmingham). One of his sons, Alfred Wills, followed him into the law and became notable both as a judge and a mountaineer. Another son, Lucy's grandfather, bought an edge-tool business in Nechells, AW Wills & Son, which manufactured such implements as scythes and sickles. Lucy's father continued to manage the business and the family was comfortably well off.

Lucy Wills's father, William Leonard Wills (1858–1911), was a science graduate of Owens College (later part of the Victoria University of Manchester, now part of the University of Manchester). Her mother, Gertrude Annie Wills née Johnston (1855–1939), was the only daughter (with six brothers) of a well-known Birmingham doctor, James Johnston. The family had a strong interest in scientific matters. William Wills, the lawyer mentioned above, had been involved with the British Association for the Advancement of Science and wrote papers on meteorology and other scientific observations. Her father was particularly interested in botany, zoology, geology, and natural sciences generally, as well as in the developing science of photography. Her brother, Leonard Johnston Wills, carried this interest in geology and natural sciences into his own career with great success.

Lucy Wills was brought up in the country near Birmingham, initially in Sutton Coldfield, and then from 1892 in Barnt Green to the south of the city. She went at first to a local school called Tanglewood, kept by a Miss Ashe, formerly a governess to the Chamberlain family of Birmingham.

=== Education ===
English girls had few opportunities for education and entry into the professions until towards the end of the nineteenth century. Wills was able to attend Cheltenham Ladies' College, Newnham College Cambridge, and the London School of Medicine for Women.

In September 1903 Wills went to Cheltenham, one of the first British boarding schools to train female students in science and mathematics. Wills's elder sister Edith was in the same house, Glenlee, two years ahead of her. Wills's examination record was good. She passed the 'Oxford Local Senior, Division I' in 1905; the 'University of London, Matriculation, Division II' in 1906; and 'Part I, Class III and Paley, exempt from Part II and additional subjects by matriculation (London).

In September 1907, Wills began her studies at Newnham, a women's college. Wills was strongly influenced by the botanist Albert Seward and by the geologist Herbert Henry Thomas, who worked on carboniferous palaeobotany. Wills finished her course in 1911 and obtained a Class 2 in Part 1 of the Natural Sciences Tripos in 1910 and Class 2 in Part 2 (Botany) in 1911. While she was allowed to sit the University examinations, she was ineligible as a woman to receive a Cambridge degree. She changed her study direction from paleobotany to medicine after publishing a single paper in 1914 about plant cuticles from some British Paleozoic plant fossils. She recorded help with this work from Hugh Hamshaw Thomas, paleobotany lecturer and curator of the museum of the botany department.

=== 1911 to 1914 ===
In February 1911, Wills's father died at the age of 53. She had been very close to him, and it is likely that his unexpected death affected her final exam results that summer. In 1913, her elder sister Edith died at the age of 26. Later that year, Wills and her mother travelled to Ceylon, now Sri Lanka, where they visited relatives and friends. In 1914, she and her younger brother Gordon travelled to South Africa. A friend from Newnham, Margaret (Margot) Hume, was lecturing in botany at the South African College, then part of the University of the Cape of Good Hope. She and Wills were both interested in Sigmund Freud's theories. At the outbreak of war in August 1914, Gordon enlisted in the Transvaal Scottish Regiment. Wills spent some weeks doing voluntary nursing in a hospital in Cape Town, before she and Margot Hume returned to England, arriving in Plymouth in December.

=== Medical training ===
In January 1915, Wills enrolled at the London (Royal Free Hospital) School of Medicine for Women, the first school in Britain to train female doctors. The school had strong links with India, and had a number of students from there, including Jerusha Jhirad, who became the first Indian woman to qualify with a degree in obstetrics and gynecology in 1919.

Wills became a legally qualified medical practitioner with the qualification of Licentiate of the Royal College of Physicians London awarded in May 1920 (LRCP Lond 1920), and the University of London degrees of Bachelor of Medicine and Bachelor of Surgery awarded in December 1920 (MB BS Lond), at age 32.

== Professional career ==
=== 1920 to 1928 ===
On qualifying, Wills decided to research and teach in the department of Pregnant Pathology at the Royal Free. There she worked with Christine Pillman (who later married Ernest Ulysses Williams OBE, a doctor on its teaching staff) who had been at Girton at the same time Wills was at Newnham, on metabolic studies of pregnancy.

=== To India ===
In 1928 Wills began her seminal research work in India on macrocytic anaemia in pregnancy, a condition where the red blood cells are larger than normal. This was prevalent in a severe form among poorer women with dietary deficiencies, particularly those in the textile industry. Dr Margaret Balfour of the Indian Medical Service had asked her to join the Maternal Mortality Inquiry by the Indian Research Fund Association at the Haffkine Institute in Bombay, now Mumbai.

Wills was in India between 1928 and 1933, mostly based at the Haffkine. From April to October 1929, she moved her work to the Pasteur Institute of India in Coonoor (where Sir Robert McCarrison was Director of Nutrition Research). In early 1931 she was working at the Caste and Gosha Hospital in Madras, now the Government Kasturba Gandhi Hospital for Women and Children of Chennai (see Gosha woman). In each of the summers of 1930–32 she returned to England for a few months and continued her work in the pathology laboratories at the Royal Free. She was back at the Royal Free full-time in 1933, but there was another 10-week working visit to the Haffkine Institute from November 1937 to early January 1938. On this occasion, and for the first time, Wills travelled by air to Karachi and onward by sea.

She travelled to India in October 1937 by air, a five-day journey on Imperial Airways's recently inaugurated route carrying mail and some passengers. The aircraft was a Short 'C' Class Empire flying boat, the Calypso, G AEUA. The route started at Southampton and involved landings on water for refuelling at Marseilles, Bracciano near Rome, Brindisi, Athens, Alexandria, Tiberias, Habbaniyah to the west of Baghdad, Basra, Bahrain, Dubai, Gwadar and Karachi, with overnight stops at Rome, Alexandria, Basra and Sharjah (just outside Dubai). This was the first IA flight to go beyond Alexandria.

In Bombay Wills was on dining terms with the governors and their wives at Government House – Sir Leslie Wilson in 1928 and Sir Frederick Sykes in 1929. In 1929 she visited Mysuru and wrote to her brother that "I was most fortunate to be under the wing of Sir Charles Todhunter, who is a very important person there." Todhunter had been Governor of Madras and in 1929 was the secretary to the Maharaja of Mysuru.

=== Anaemia of pregnancy ===
Wills observed a correlation between the dietary habits of different classes of Bombay women and the likelihood of their becoming anaemic during pregnancy. Poor Muslim women were the ones with both the most deficient diets and the greatest susceptibility to anaemia.

This anaemia was then known as 'pernicious anaemia of pregnancy'. However, Wills was able to demonstrate that the anaemia she observed differed from true pernicious anaemia, as the patients did not have achlorhydria, an inability to produce gastric acid. Furthermore, while patients responded to crude liver extracts, they did not respond to the 'pure' liver extracts (vitamin B_{12}) which had been shown to treat true pernicious anaemia. She postulated that there must have been another nutritional factor responsible for this macrocytic anaemia other than vitamin B_{12} deficiency. For some years this nutritional factor was known as the 'Wills Factor', and it was later shown, in the 1940s, to be folate, of which the synthetic form is folic acid.

Wills decided to investigate possible nutritional treatments by first studying the effects of dietary manipulation on a macrocytic anaemia in albino rats. This work was done at the Nutritional Research Laboratories at the Pasteur Institute of India in Coonoor. Rats fed on the same diet as Bombay Muslim women became anaemic, pregnant ones dying before giving birth. The rat anaemia was prevented by the addition of yeast to synthetic diets which had no vitamin B. This work was later duplicated using rhesus monkeys as the rat results were tainted by a lice infection which may have skewed those results.

Back in Bombay, Wills conducted clinical trials on patients with macrocytic anaemia and established experimentally that this type could be both prevented and cured by yeast extracts, of which the cheapest source was Marmite.

=== After India ===
Wills was back again at the Royal Free Hospital in London from 1938 until her retirement in 1947. During the Second World War she was a full-time pathologist in the Emergency Medical Service. Work in the pathology department was disrupted for a few days in July 1944 (and a number of people were killed) when the hospital suffered a direct hit from a V1 flying bomb. By the end of the war, she was in charge of pathology at the Royal Free Hospital and had established the first haematology department there.

After her retirement, Wills travelled extensively, including to Jamaica, Fiji and South Africa, continuing her observations on nutrition and anaemia. In Fiji she, along with New Zealander Dr. Muriel Bell, was responsible for carrying out the first multi-ethnic nutritional survey of women and children in Fiji (1950). They studied the source of anaemias, protein and vitamin deficiencies there. Their work was based on some flawed assumptions about the causes of these issues, while at the same time their recommendations were responsible for the introduction of free iron tablets for anaemic pregnant women and attempts to provide infants and children with increased protein intake through feeding programmes at schools and health centers.

== Personal life ==
Wills never married. She was close to her parents, her siblings, and their children. She enjoyed a number of close lifelong friendships, including with Christine and Ulysses Williams, with her Cambridge contemporary Margot Hume (with whom she jointly owned a cottage in Surrey whose botanical garden they cultivated), and with Kait Lucan (the Dowager Countess of Lucan, mother of John Bingham, 7th Earl of Lucan, the disappearing earl), who was a fellow Labour Councillor in Chelsea.

Obituaries and other publications describe her as independent, autocratic, not a sufferer of fools, a joyous and enthusiastic teacher, an indomitable walker and skier, an enthusiastic traveller, a lover of the beauty of nature, mirthful and entertaining.

Wills died on 26 April 1964. Her obituary in the British Medical Journal the following month included the following comments:

The excellence of her work on tropical megaloblastic anaemia has long been recognized by nutritionists and haematologists. Every medical student has heard of its cure by her discovery of the Wills factor in yeast extract, which paved the way for the subsequent work on folic acid. It was one of the simple but great observations which are landmarks in the history and treatment of the nutritional anaemias. Lucy Wills even in her seventies was always a tireless worker, and seeing her example other people found themselves working harder than they had believed possible. Though impatient with laziness and with half-baked opinions, she was compassionate to other human failings. She held strong convictions on social questions, and steadily upheld them as a borough councillor in Chelsea during the last decade of her life. She had wide interests, particularly loving books, gardens, music, and the theatre, and enjoying life always with keen intelligence and humour. Her generosity and magnanimity, combined with outstanding ability and resolution, made friends of all who ever worked with her and found her worthy of profound respect and deep affection.

== Publications ==
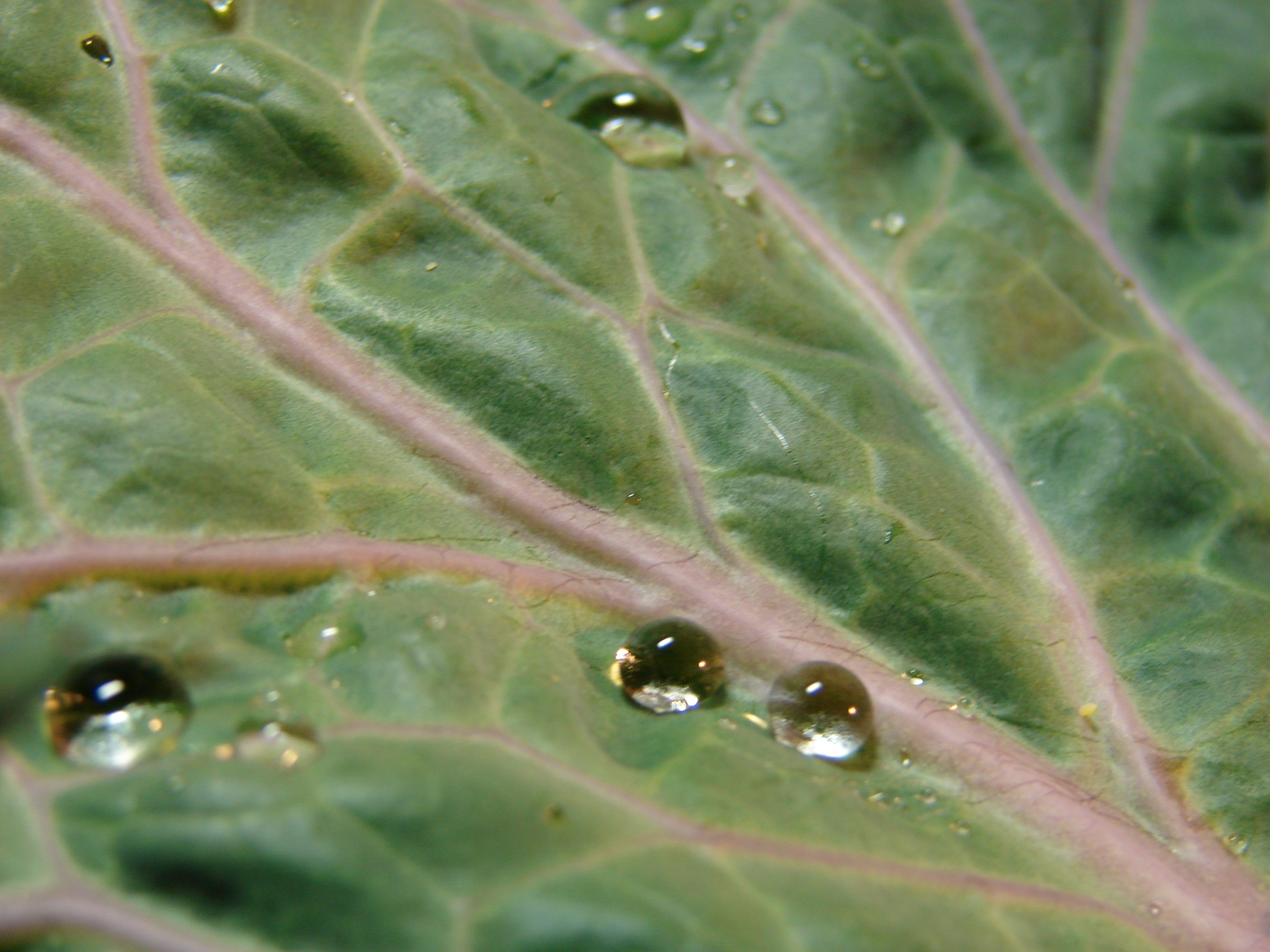
Water beads on the waxy cuticle of kale leaves

Wills's first learned paper was in 1914, on plant cuticles. There were a further two papers in the 1920s before she started her work in India. Four reports of her field and laboratory studies in India were published in the Indian Journal of Medical Research in 1930 and 1931. After her return to England, there were a number of further papers concerning her work on tropical macrocytic anaemia.

A list of her main publications is set out below:

- Wills, L. (1914). "I. Plant Cuticles from the Coal-Measures of Britain". Geological Magazine. 1 (9). Cambridge University Press (CUP): 385–390. Bibcode:1914GeoM....1..385W. doi:10.1017/s0016756800152987. ISSN 0016-7568. OCLC 4668925529. S2CID 129458157.
- Wills, L.; Warwick, Joan (1924), "The Adenoid Child: A Histological and Clinical Study", QJM, 17 (66): 162–169, doi:10.1093/qjmed/os-17.66.162, ISSN 1460-2725, OCLC 4934740950
- Pillman-Williams, EC & Wills, L (1929), Studies in blood and urinary chemistry during pregnancy: blood sugar curves. Quarterly Journal of Medicine 22 493–505
- Wills, L & Mechta, MM (1930), Studies in 'pernicious anaemia' of pregnancy. Part I Preliminary report. Indian Journal of Medical Research 17 777–792
- Wills, L & Talpade, SN (1930), Studies in 'pernicious anaemia' of pregnancy. Part II A survey of dietetic and hygienic conditions of women in Bombay. Indian Journal of Medical Research 18 283–306
- Wills, L & Mechta, MM (1930), Studies in 'pernicious anaemia' of pregnancy. Part III Determination of normal blood standards for the nutritional laboratory's stock albino rat. Indian Journal of Medical Research 18 307–317
- Wills, L & Mechta, MM (1930), Studies in 'pernicious anaemia' of pregnancy. Part IV The production of pernicious anaemia (Bartonella anaemia) in intact albino rats by deficient feeding. Indian Journal of Medical Research 18 663–683
- Wills, L (1931), Treatment of 'pernicious anaemia' of pregnancy and 'tropical anaemia,' with special reference to yeast extract as a curative agent. British Medical Journal 1 1059–1064
- Wills, L (1933), The nature of the haemopoietic factor in Marmite. Lancet 221 1283–1285
- Wills, L (1934), Studies in pernicious anaemia of pregnancy. Part VI. Tropical macrocytic anaemia as a deficiency disease, with special reference to the vitamin B complex. Indian Journal of Medical Research 21 669–681
- Wills, L & Stewart, A (1935), British Journal of Experimental Pathology 16 444
- Wills, L & Clutterbuck, PW & Evans, BDF (1937), A new factor in the production and cure of certain macrocytic anaemias. Lancet 229 311–314
- Wills, L & Evans, BDF (1938), Tropical macrocytic anaemia: its relation to pernicious anaemia. Lancet 232 416–421
- Wills, L (1945), Nutrition surveys. London School of Medicine Magazine 6–7 NS 2–5

== Popular recognition ==
On 10 May 2019, the 131st anniversary of her birth, search engine Google commemorated Wills with a Doodle, shown in North America, parts of South America and Europe, Israel, India, and New Zealand. The accompanying text stated, "Today's Doodle celebrates English haematologist Lucy Wills, the pioneering medical researcher whose analysis of prenatal anemia changed the face of preventive prenatal care for women everywhere."
