= Gosh! =

- First issue: October 1978
- Final issue: August 1979
- Based in: Los Angeles
- Language: English

Gosh! (styled as GOSH!) was a Los Angeles–based arts, entertainment, and fashion magazine published in eleven issues between October, 1978 and August, 1979.

== History ==
In its short history it became notable enough to be recognized by the Smithsonian Institution and included in their archives. In addition, Gosh! articles written by Dennis Cooper have been archived as part of the Dennis Cooper Papers in the Fales Library and Special Collections of New York University. It was distributed free of charge in art galleries, alternative bookstores and music shops in the Los Angeles area. Articles ranged from interviews with experimental filmmakers like George Kuchar, Sara Kathryn Arledge, and Ted V. Mikels; influential radio announcers like Rodney Bingenheimer; to reviews of art exhibits, like Susan Greiger's (now Susan Singer) controversial show at Aarnun gallery featuring life-sized nude photos arranged in a flip book and an exhibit about how celebrities and common folk relate to their own noses.

Also included in the magazine were punk, jazz, and alternative music reviews featuring musicians like "The Hipster" Harry Gibson, Fred Frith, Charlie Parker, and Lester Young; and reproductions of original art, illustrations, comics, and photographs from many avant garde contributors. Even the advertisements were very interesting, such as the artist Jack McIntosh's ads selling art trash from his studio for five to two hundred dollars. One Jack McIntosh ad offered his services as a speaker at your church or club for $20. Included in the ad was the picture of a bizarre, drooling man with bulging eyes and vampire teeth.

The magazine's legacy was publishing early work by a variety of writers, artists, and photographers who went on to considerable success in their respective fields. Dennis Cooper, Michelle Huneven, Kirk Silsbee, Doug Humble, John Breckow, Gusmano Cesaretti, Jules Bates, Karla Karin, Sid Griffin, Steve Escandon, and others contributed to Gosh! The legendary illustrator, Neon Park, best remembered for his record album covers for the rock band Little Feat and for the Mothers of Invention's Weasels Ripped My Flesh did cover art for the ninth issue, showing an atom bomb exploding through an open zipper in the surface of the earth, as if a nuclear explosion is the ultimate male erection.

Gosh! was printed on newsprint in black and white in a signature of 12 sheets. Some covers contained black and one color, usually red or blue, used on the magazine logo of the word "GOSH!" surrounded by a circle. It was published in folio format on paper 17 by 22 inches and folded twice to appear 8½ by 11 inches. When unfolded to reveal the content, 24 pages were each 11 × 17 inches and facing each other. The editor and publisher of Gosh! was Terry Cannon, who is himself as notable as the other artists he included in the magazine. Cannon also founded the Pasadena, and later, Los Angeles Filmforum which continues to be active in Hollywood showing the works of experimental filmmakers, and the Baseball Reliquary, which presents exhibits showing an alternative view of the history and social impact of America's national pastime, and annually inducts prominent baseball figures into its 'Shrine of the Eternals'. In addition, Cannon served as an editor on his father's classic car mechanic's magazine Skinned Knuckles. He currently works as Staff Assistant III at the Pasadena Public Library's Allendale Branch. The editorial office for Gosh! was located at 35 N. Raymond Avenue in Old Town Pasadena during Pasadena's period of intense art making activities of the 1970s and 80s.
