= Oh my gosh =

Oh my gosh may refer to:

== Songs ==
- "Oh My Gosh" (Basement Jaxx song), 2005
- "OMG (Oh My Gosh)", by Sabrina Washington, 2010
- "OMG" (Usher song), or "Oh My Gosh", 2010
- "Oh My Gosh!", by AlphaBat, 2014
- "Oh My Gosh", by Boy Story, 2019
- "Oh My Gosh", by Machel Montano and Xtatik from Here Comes the Band, 2000
- "Oh My Gosh", by MC Skepta from Microphone Champion, 2009
- "Oh My Gosh", by Nature, 2020
- "Oh My Gosh", by Seo In-young, 2011
- "Oh My Gosh", by Yemi Alade from Woman of Steel, 2019
- "Oh My Gosh", by Yung6ix, 2011

== Other uses ==
- Oh My Gosh! Tour, by comedian Charlie Berens

== See also ==
- Gosh (disambiguation)
- Oh My (disambiguation)
- Oh My God (disambiguation)
- OMG (disambiguation)
- Euphemism
- Gosh darn
- Minced oath
