= Oh My Ghost =

Oh My Ghost may refer to:

- "Oh My Ghost? (Watashi ga Akuryō ni Natte mo)", a 2011 song by Shiritsu Ebisu Chugaku
- Oh My Ghost (South Korean TV series), a 2015 television series
- Oh My Ghost (Thai TV series), a 2018 television series
- Oh! My Ghost, a 2021 South Korean film
- Oh My Ghost (film), a 2022 Indian film

== See also ==
- OMG (disambiguation)
