= Herbert Henry Thomas =

British geologist (1876–1935)

Herbert Henry Thomas FRS (13 March 1876 - 12 May 1935 ) was a British geologist who linked the bluestones at Stonehenge with rocks in south west Wales. He won the Murchison Medal.

== Early life and education ==
Thomas was born at Exeter, the son of Frederick Thomas, a hatter and councillor, and his wife Louisa. He was educated at Exeter School under W. A. Cunningham and was admitted to Sidney Sussex College, Cambridge, on 1 October 1894. He was a Harkness Scholar and was awarded a 1st class BA degree in Natural Sciences.

== Career ==
Thomas won the Sedgwick prize in 1903 and was assistant to Professor William Johnson Sollas at Oxford, earning B.A. and B.Sc. From 1901 to 1911, he was geologist to the Geological Survey of Great Britain and was a petrographer from 1911 to 1935 working for the Geological Survey Department. He was a leading paleobiologist and carried out some work on carboniferous palaeobotany. At Cambridge at this time he was an influence on Lucy Wills and was awarded Doctor of Science (Sc.D.) in 1914.

During the First World War, Thomas carried out some war related activities such as analysing concrete from German pillboxes and advising on materials to be used in the manufacture of aircraft compasses.

Thomas was an archaeologist, and an expert on how rock was used by primitive people for weapons and monuments. In 1923, he was the first to propose that the bluestones used in the construction of Stonehenge were identical to rocks in the Preseli Hills in Pembrokeshire, Wales. Thomas was secretary of the Geological Society of London from 1912 to 1922 and its vice-president from 1922 to 1924. He won the Murchison Medal of the Geological Society in 1925 and was elected a Fellow of the Royal Society on 12 May 1927.

== Private life ==
Thomas married Anna Maria Mosley, the daughter of Rev. Oswald Mosley, late vicar of Prickwillow in Cambridgeshire, in 1904. They lived at Surbiton and had a son and daughter.

== Publications ==
- Thomas, H. H. (1909). "A Contribution to the Petrography of the New Red Sandstone in the West of England". Quarterly Journal of the Geological Society. 65 (1–4): 229–245. doi:10.1144/GSL.JGS.1909.065.01-04.18. S2CID 129185614.
- Thomas, H. H.; MacAlister, D. A. (1909). "IV.—The Geology of Ore Deposits". Geological Magazine. 6 (12): 565–567. doi:10.1017/S0016756800128122.
- Thomas, H.H. 1923. "The source of the stones of Stonehenge." Antiquaries Journal 3, 239-260
- E. B. Bailey (and others) 1924 Tertiary and post-Tertiary geology of Mull, Loch Aline, and Oban. A description of parts of sheets 43, 44, 51, and 52 of the geological map with contributions by E. M. Anderson [and others] with petrology by H. H. Thomas and E. B. Bailey, with chemical analyses by E. G. Radley and F. R. Ennos and Paleobotany, by A. C. Seward and R. E. Holttum HMSO
