= Skinned Knuckles =

American trade publication

Skinned Knuckles is a monthly publication written by and for antique and classic automobile restorers. Fondly known to subscribers merely as "SK", it answers to either name. It has been in continuous publication since 1976. This journal promotes authentic restoration of cars and trucks. It does not advocate modification, alteration or ‘hot-rodding’. Its mission is to preserve the historical integrity of vehicles, ranging from the earliest electric, steam and internal combustion or gasoline engines to the period where legislation dictated emission controls and computers replaced the mechanical components of a car.

== History and profile ==
Initially founded by Bill Cannon in 1976, the first issue was published in February 1977. The early issues have become true collector's items, sought by restorers to complete their library. For the past fifteen years, editor Neil Maken has maintained the original mission of Authentic Restoration — bringing the car or truck back to the condition which it was in when it first left the factory. Over the years a number of very well known and highly respected names in the automotive restoration hobby have contributed articles, thoughts and opinions to this journal. Thousands of articles, shop-hints, product and book reviews, short-cuts and vehicle analysis have appeared in the 525+ issues. Many of these back issues are still available from the original inventory. The magazine is based in Huntington Beach, California.

Selected columns from Skinned Knuckles appear regularly in such publications as Vintage Truck magazine, The Pierce-Arrow Society newsletters, Old Cars Weekly and the Old Cars Weekly Guide to Restoration, and numerous antique-car club newsletters.

From the beginning, and continuing today, Skinned Knuckles is available by subscription only, not on the newsstands. Many of the current subscribers are also original subscribers, priding themselves on owning complete libraries dating from Volume 1, Issue 1.

Skinned Knuckles prides itself on the fact that it is not merely a ‘picture’ magazine of pretty cars and trucks, but is specifically written for the collector interested in restoring a vehicle to its original condition. They are in the technical forefront of restoration and other subjects of a topical and timely nature. There is a carefully balanced mix between the traditional "antique" automobiles and trucks—pre-World War II—and the "newer" collectibles which are the center of interest to some of the younger, new-to-the-hobby collector. The journal is geared toward the handy, grease-under-the-fingernails type of mechanic. Subscribers drive their cars, not merely display them at car shows. They are proud of their vehicles.

Skinned Knuckles seem to have stopped publishing. The website and phone numbers are no longer active and current subscribers no longer receive issues. I received my most current issue in April 2021 but others have received their last one in September.
