= Gosh, Armenia =

Gosh Գոշ
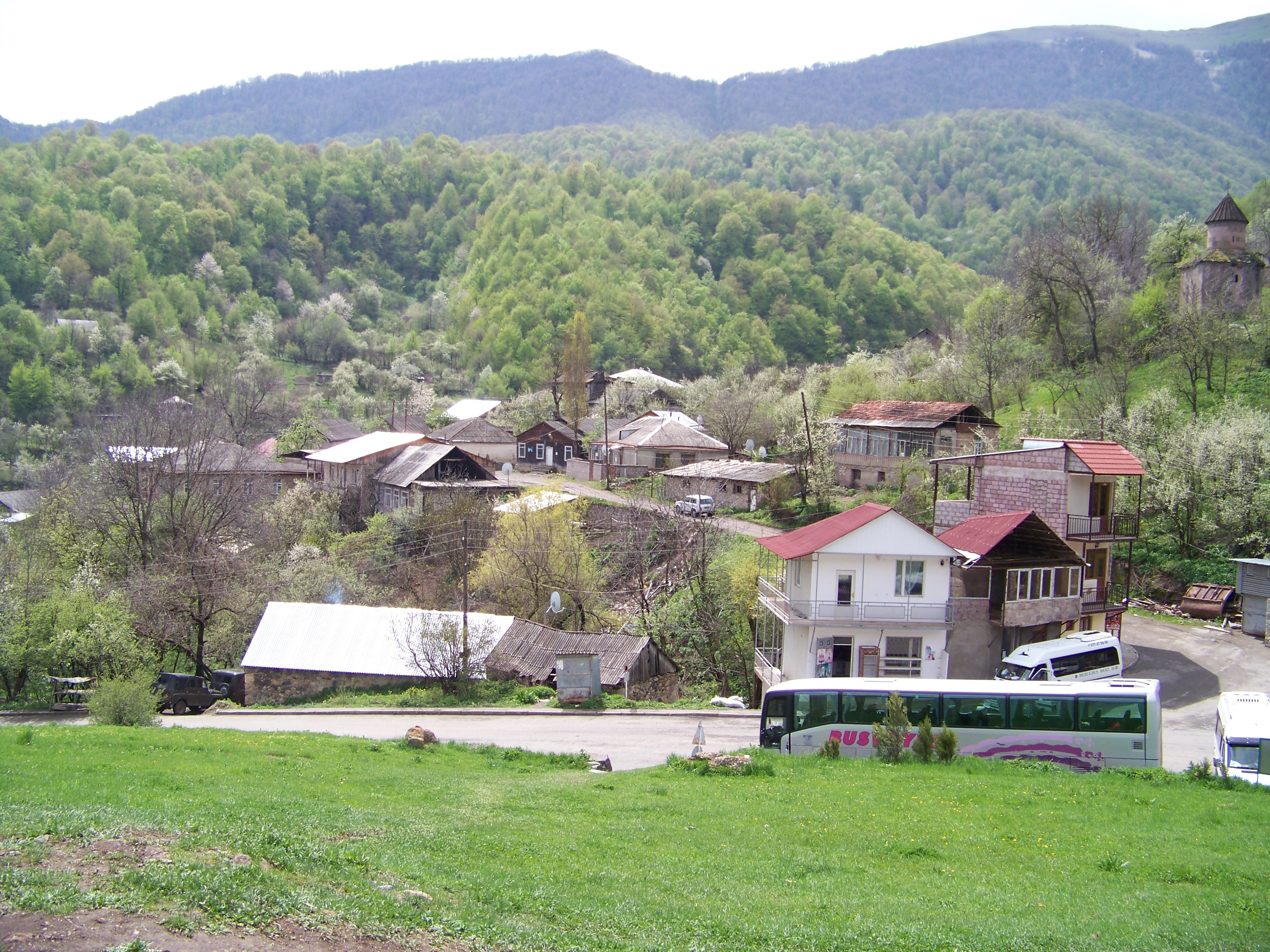
- A view of Gosh

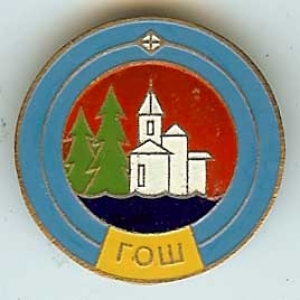
- Coat of arms

- Location in Armenia Gosh (Tavush)
- Coordinates: 40°43′45″N 44°59′50″E
- Country: Armenia
- Province: Tavush
- Municipality: Dilijan

Population (2011)
  - Total: 1,115
- Time zone: UTC+4 (AMT)

Gosh (Armenian: Գոշ) is a village in the Dilijan Municipality of the Tavush Province of Armenia.

== Etymology ==
The village is named after Mkhitar Gosh (1130–1213) who took part in the rebuilding of the Nor Ghetik Monastery during the 12th-13th centuries, which was destroyed by an earthquake in 1188. The newly built monastery was later named Goshavank in honor of Mkhitar.

Goshavank is located just off the main highway that runs through the village. On a hillside west of the monastery complex sits a chapel that also serves as the tomb of Mkhitar Gosh. It was situated to overlook the monastery in which he helped build. The chapel is square in plan with a single centrally located dome above and one portal. Nearby are the ruins of what is said to be Mkhitar's house. Stone foundations and low walls still exist.

== Gallery ==
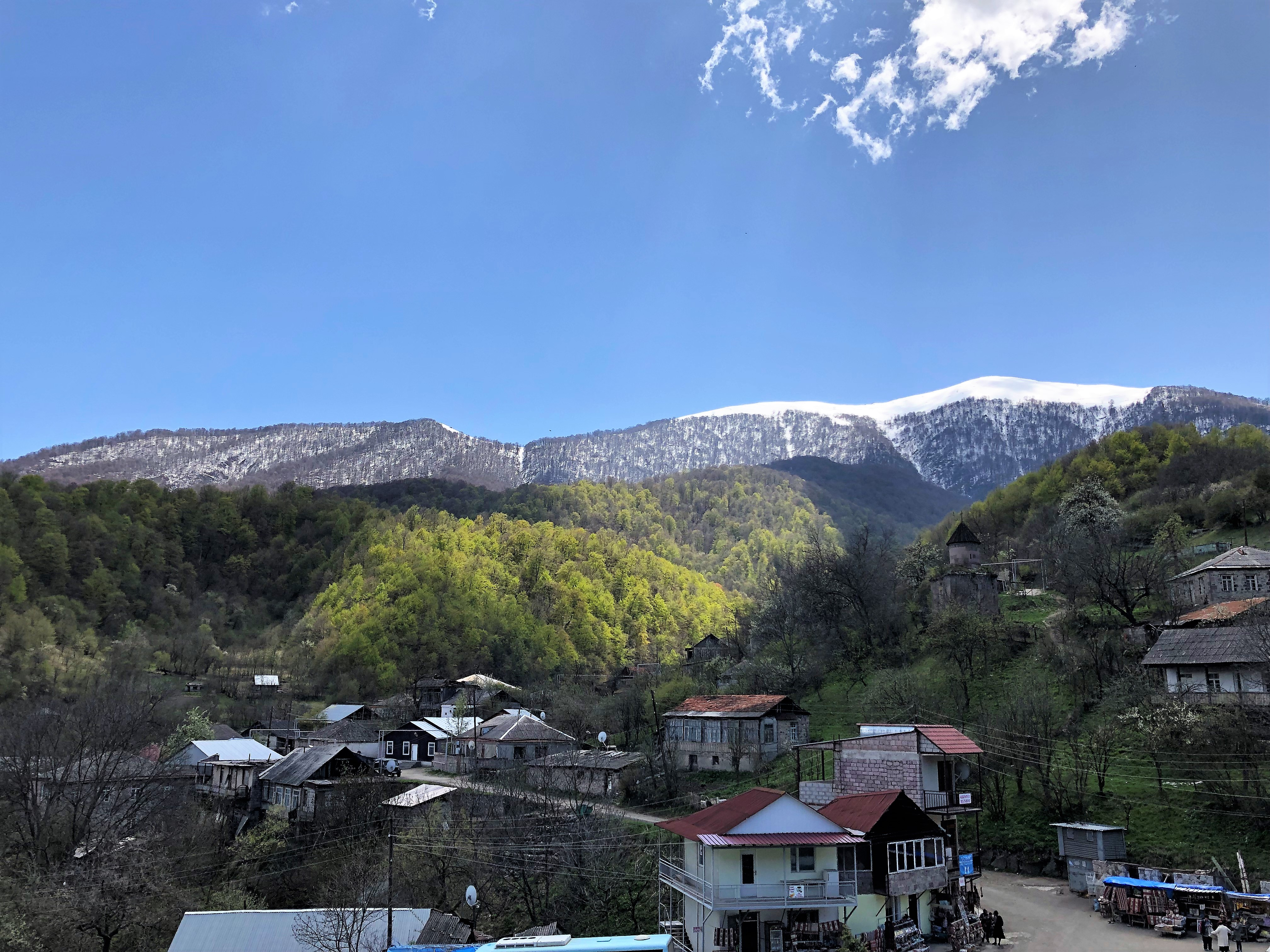
A view of the village

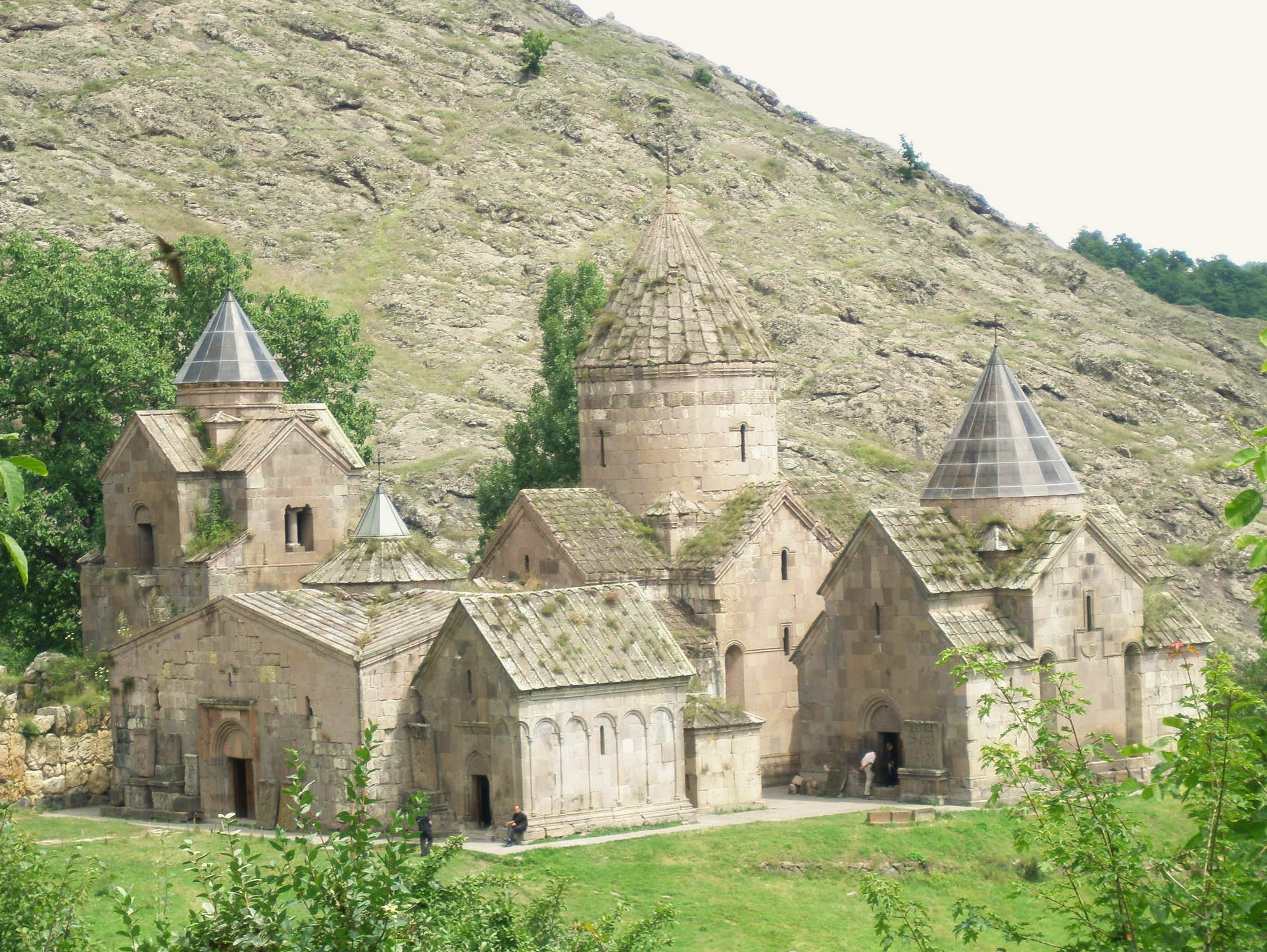
Goshavank, August 2009

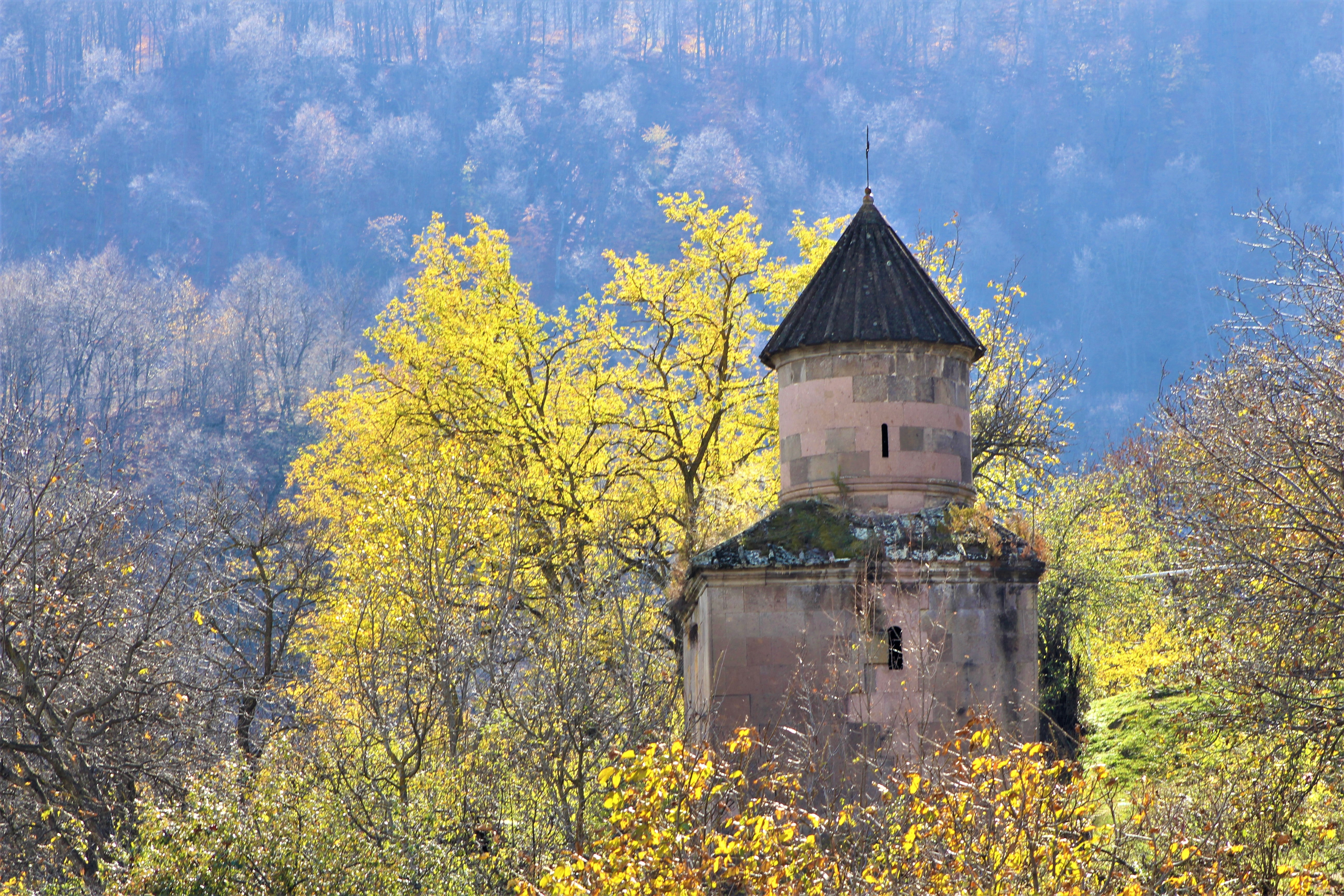
St. George's Church (Mkhitar Gosh's funeral chapel)

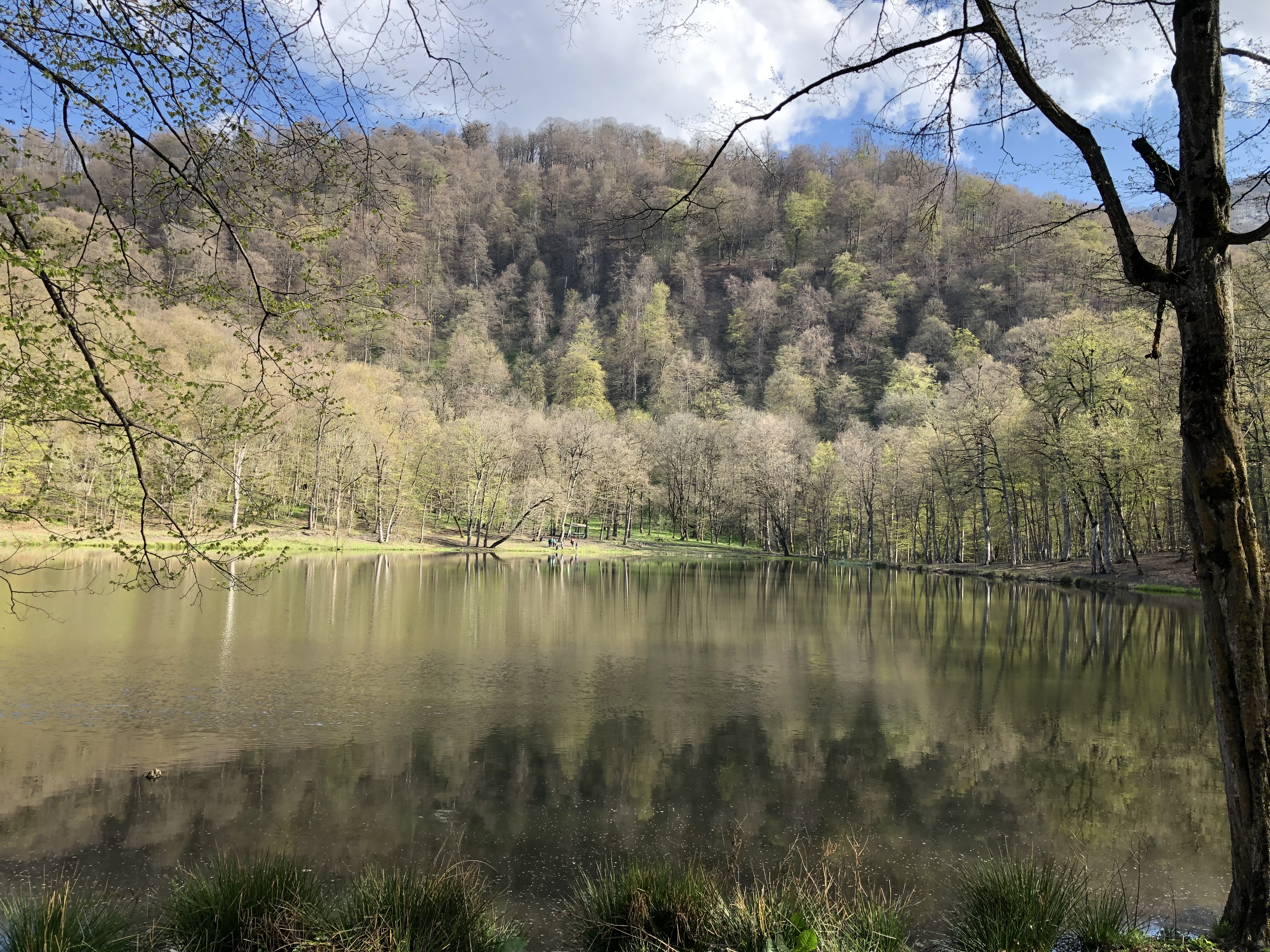
Gosh lake

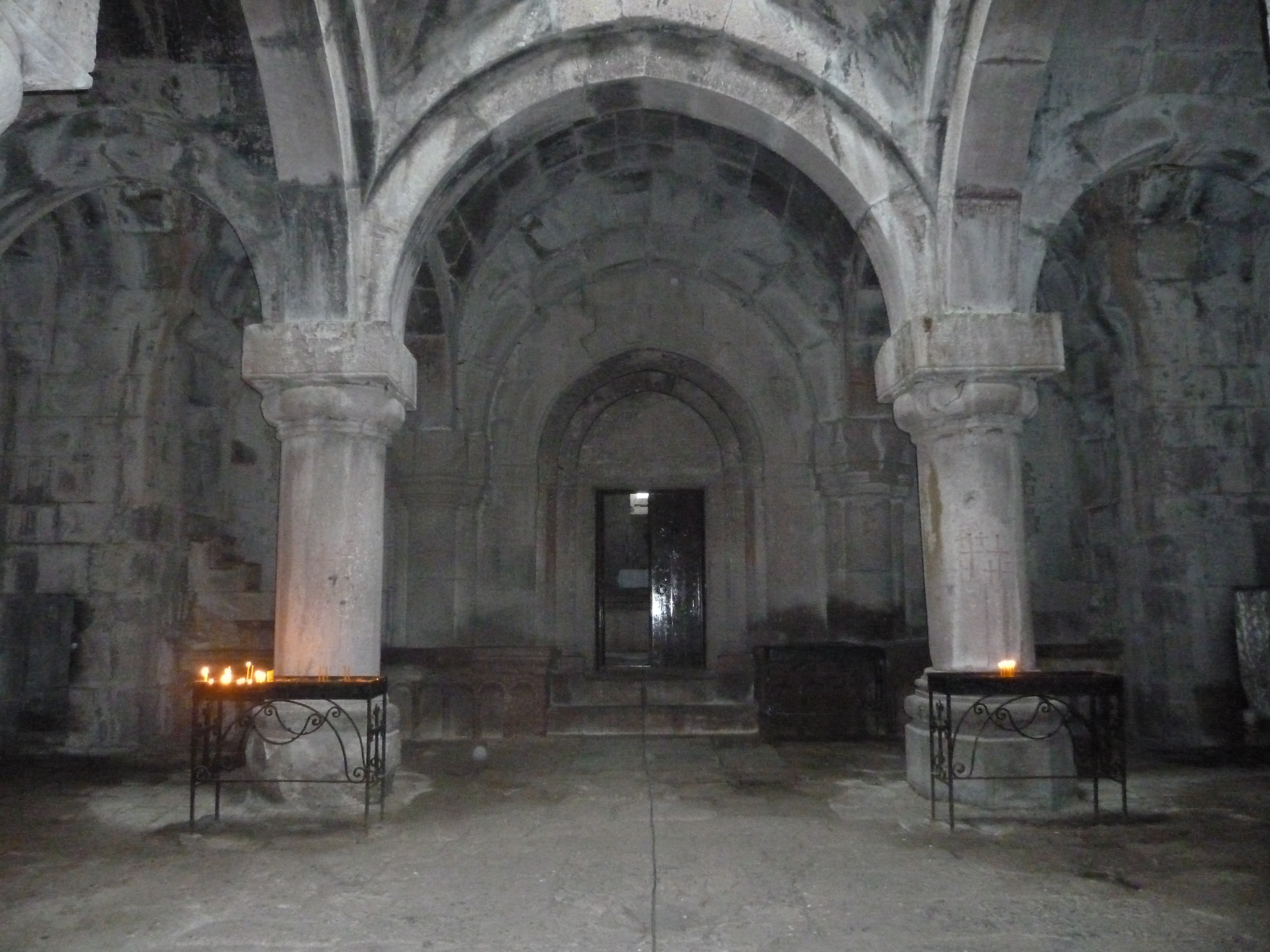
Goshavank interior

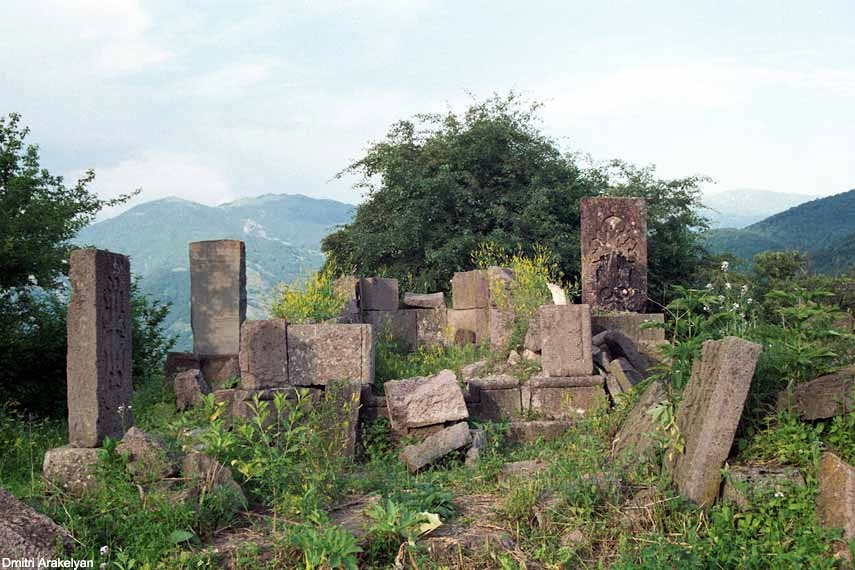
The ruins of Mikhtar Gosh's house
