= Dolly (tool) =

Metalworking tool

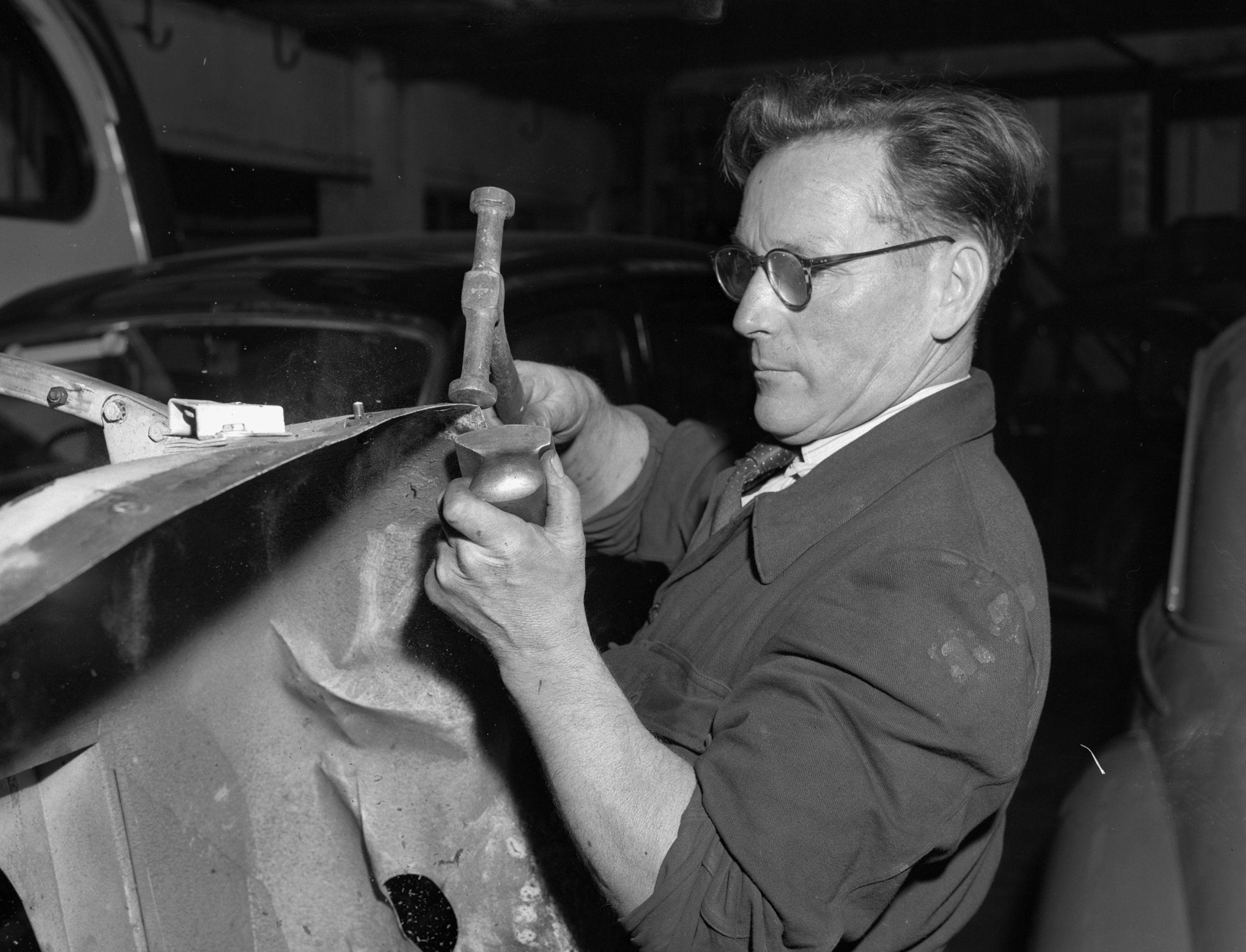
Body Technician Repair Panel With Dolly

A dolly is the name given to a category of tools used in shaping sheet metal. Typically a dolly is a solid piece of metal, small enough to hold in one hand, with a curved or shaped face. Generally a dolly will have more than one surface, each with its own radius of curvature (much like a three-dimensional French curve), allowing the craftsman more flexibility in using the tool.

== Common types ==
Most common types are called heel, toe, wedge or comma, general or track, and egg dollies. Egg dollies are often not included in hammer and dolly sets, but due to their unique shape they are very handy.

- Heel dolly: Has a long radius on one side and a flat on the other, hence they look like the heel of a shoe. One face is domed and that other is flat.
- Toe dolly: Has a short radius on one side and is twice as long as the heel. Similarly it has a domed and flat side also.
- Wedge dolly or "Comma": It looks just like a comma, the narrow side makes it ideal for tight contours.
- General purpose dolly or "Track": Has many different surfaces and contours, easy to hold while dealing with substantial blows.
- Egg dolly: Rounded all over in different contours but on one side it does have straight edges and angles.

A dolly can be used either as a hammer, shaping the metal to match the curve of the dolly, or as small anvil to provide a curved surface over which to dome or dish metal. They are commonly used to shape sheet metal in auto repair, especially in locations where it is difficult to swing a hammer.

They can also be used as backers for upsetting metal. When used as a portable anvil, a dolly can be used to hold a rivet in position while it is being clenched with a "snapper". Such dollies are commonly cylindrical in shape, and rely on mass to work. The act of using it is known as holding up or holding on. Dollies can also be used in boat building, when clenching nails. See clinker (boat building).
