= Plastic headlight restoration =

Restoration of discoloured plastic headlights back to clear

Headlight restoration or plastic headlight restoration is the act of restoring aged headlight lenses that have become discolored or dull due the original factory UV protective coating degrading primarily due to UV light and other environmental factors such as road debris impact (stones, sand, etc.) rain, and exposure to caustic chemicals. Over time the factory protective hardcoat breaks down with UV degradation and wear from abrasion, etc. If left untreated the polycarbonate lens will eventually develop small surface cracks, a condition referred to as crazing. Also, the polycarbonate lens will eventually discolor through the thickness of the lens, The effectiveness of the headlight in terms of light output measured in lux can be significantly reduced. This condition which results in hazy and discoloured lenses is known for causing reduced night time visibility for drivers as the condition becomes worse. It is possible for cloudy and hazy headlights to be restored to a like-new condition and represents typically a far more economical alternative than replacing the lens.

Additionally, headlight restoration if done right with the reapplication of a UV protective hard coat extends the usable life of the headlight assembly, can be repeated if necessary and is considerably "greener" than disposal and replacement of headlights reducing land fill and microplastics entering the environment..

== Professional headlight restoration services ==
There are a number of professional headlight restoration services that charge approximately $100 to $250 to restore both headlights on a vehicle. Replacing the lens can be much more expensive. There are many do-it-yourself headlight restoration kits available on the market but mostly do not come with an adequate UV protective hard coat that lasts. Some professional headlight restoration shops apply a urethane or acrylic clear coat to help protect the plastic lens from UV exposure which lasts many years longer than only buffing and polishing the lens.

== DIY headlight restoration products ==
There are many "do it yourself" headlight restoration kits available for purchase. A few of the major brands that produce these kits include 3M, Turtle Wax, Sylvania, Rain-X, and Rust-Oleum. Most of these kits require multiple stages of wet sanding to remove the oxidation of the headlight lens, usually with descending level of grit (coarse to fine). Some kits include a UV sealant which is said to protect the lens of the headlight longer. Kits with the UV sealant include some of the 3M, Sylvania. Typically the DIY sealant requires regular periodic reapplication and is not equivalent to the original OEM hardcoat applied during manufacturing or a professional who would spray the lens with a UV protective hard coat. . Another option to delay the aging process of headlight lenses, is the use of press and snap-on headlight covers, or laminates with adhesives that can be applied over the headlight lenses, such as Paint Protection Film sold by 3M.
