= OMG =

OMG or omg may refer to:

- Oh My Gosh/God/Goodness, in SMS language for text messages

== Arts, entertainment and media ==
=== Film ===
- OMG – Oh My God!, a 2012 Indian Hindi-language satirical comedy drama
  - OMG 2, 2023
- OMG (Oh, My Girl!), a 2009 romantic comedy
- OMG: O Manchi Ghost, 2024 Telugu horror comedy film

=== Music ===
- OMG Girlz, an American girl group
- Oh My Girl, a South Korean girl group
- OMG (album), by Rusko, 2010
- OMG (single album), by NewJeans, 2023
  - "OMG" (NewJeans song), 2023
- "OMG" (Usher song), 2010
- "OMG" (Camila Cabello song), 2017
- "OMG" (Gryffin and Carly Rae Jepsen song), 2019
- "OMG" (Candelita song), by Candelita (Jose Iglesias), 2024
- "OMG", by Jenna Rose, 2011
- "OMG", by Little Mix from Get Weird, 2015
- "OMG", by Arash, 2016
- "OMG", by Koda Kumi from Re(cord), 2019
- "OMG!", by Marteria, 2014
- "OMG", by Sampa the Great, 2020
- "OMG (Oh My God)", by TaeTiSeo from Twinkle, 2012
- "OMG (Oh My Gosh)", by Sabrina Washington, 2010

=== Other uses in arts, entertainment and media ===
- OMG! Magazine, a former gay & lesbian lifestyle and news publication
- OMG (esports), a Chinese esports team
- Yahoo OMG, later Yahoo Celebrity, part of Yahoo News, a news website

== Science and technology ==
- Oligodendrocyte-myelin glycoprotein, a protein encoded by the OMG gene
- Object Management Group, a computer industry Standards Development Organization
- OM Group, an American chemistry firm
- .omg, file extension for OpenMG

== Other uses ==
- O'Shea Jackson Jr., stage name OMG, American actor and musician, son of Ice Cube
- Omagua language, ISO 639-3 language code omg
- Omega Airport, Omega, Namibia, IATA code OMG
- Order of Mapungubwe Gold, a South African civilian honour
- Orkney Manifesto Group, a political party in Orkney, Scotland
- Operational manoeuvre group, a Soviet Army organisational manoeuvre warfare concept
- Outlaw motorcycle gang, a motorcycle subculture
- Overstory Media Group, a Canadian media company

== See also ==
- Oh My God (disambiguation)
- Oh my gosh (disambiguation)
- Oh My Ghost (disambiguation)
- OMGcon, an anime convention in Kentucky, US
- Oh-My-God particle, an ultra-high-energy cosmic ray
