= Gosha woman =

The Indian Encyclopaedia describes a Gosha or a Gosha woman as one who follows the Islamic law of concealing herself from the sight of men, except certain close relatives. It considers it a word derived from the Hindustani language, it is a synonym for women kept in purdah, used in southern India.

== Photographs ==
The Supreme Court of India rejected a petition challenging the Madras High Court's dismissal of a petition on September 7, 2006, a few days prior to the Madurai Central by-election which sought seeking for issuance of writ of mandamus forbearing the Election Commission of India "from in any way publishing or releasing the photographs of the women particularly the Muslim Gosha women in the eligible voter's list in respect of all the Constituencies in the State of Tamil Nadu particularly for the ensuring bye-election to Madurai Central Assembly Constituency."

=== Exemption from the Administrator of Lakshadweep Islands ===
The Administrator of Lakshadweep Islands exempts Gosha women from submitting photographs for entry permits. The islands are a Union territory of India, they are a restricted area wherein Indian citizens "...not a native of these islands, shall have to obtain a permit in the Prescribed Form from the Competent authority, for entering into and residing in these islands.

== Medical needs ==
History of Deccan mentions that until lady doctors arrived in 1884, gosha women of Hyderabad State were at the mercy of unqualified health practitioners. The Government Kasturba Gandhi Hospital for Women and Children of Chennai was earlier called The Victoria Caste and Gosha Hospital. Van Hollen sees purdah as an Orientalist "trope", which constructs the colonised other to legitimise colonial authority, she quotes Lal in pointing the contradiction in British policy, colonial discourse represented purdah as a sign of India's barbarism yet it accommodated it, as seen in the opening of the Gosha hospital.

== Government Museum, Chennai ==
The Government Museum, Chennai had at one time provided a time slot for Gosha women. During such a time no male visitors were allowed.

== See also ==
- Sex segregation
- Gender segregation and Islam
- Zenana
