= Classic car =

Older car

A classic car may describe an automobile 25 years or older, but this can vary depending on the jurisdiction for registration purposes or insurance company requirements. A car's age is not the only requirement before being considered a "classic." Other factors that can influence this classification include the vehicle's historical significance, rarity, and condition.

A standard criterion for recognizing cars as classics does not exist, as different countries use their own rules and regulations for classifying vehicles. A common theme is that an older car of historical interest becomes collectible and tends to be restored rather than scrapped. Therefore, one person's old car may be another's classic. Any car can be considered classic if it has dedicated owners who support it as such.

Organizations such as the Classic Car Club of America (CCCA) maintain lists of eligible unmodified cars called "classics." These are defined as "fine" or "distinctive" automobiles, either American or foreign-built, produced between 1915 and 1948. However, post-World War II classic cars are not precisely defined. The Antique Automobile Club of America (AACA) has a less restrictive definition, with a rolling forward definition of cars 25 years and older as "antiques."

== Recognition of classic status ==
=== Australia ===
Australia has two main classic car registration categories: the Historic Vehicles Scheme (HVS) and the Classic Vehicle Scheme (CVS). The latter requires for vehicles over the age of 25 (or 30), yet feature modifications out of the age-range, to be considered 'Historic.' Under these categories, owners are not required to pay the usual registration fee. However, the use of the vehicle registered under the scheme is restricted to a set limit per registration term.

For example, most classic Ford Falcons, Chrysler Valiants and Holdens (alongside Toranas, and Commodores) are on either of the registers. However, it is not uncommon for these cars to end up with full registrations.

=== Canada ===
The Vintage Car Club of Canada (VCCC) recognizes vehicles 25 years old and older. The VCCC is one of Canada's oldest collector car clubs. It has been a registered Society since the mid-1950s, and a continuous member of the (NAACC) National Association of Automobile Clubs of Canada Corporation since 1971.

The National Association of Automobile Clubs of Canada (NAACC) recognizes stock and modified vehicles that are at least 20 years old as classics. Depending on the value of the car, all imported "classic or antique vehicles are subject to a 2.5% duty rate." There are, however, two exceptions: Firstly, the NAACC is responsible for doing away with import duties at the Canadian border for all vehicles and related parts 25 years old or older. Secondly, vehicles manufactured in Canada are also exempt from duties, as long as the car's manufacturer can be verified.

=== United States ===
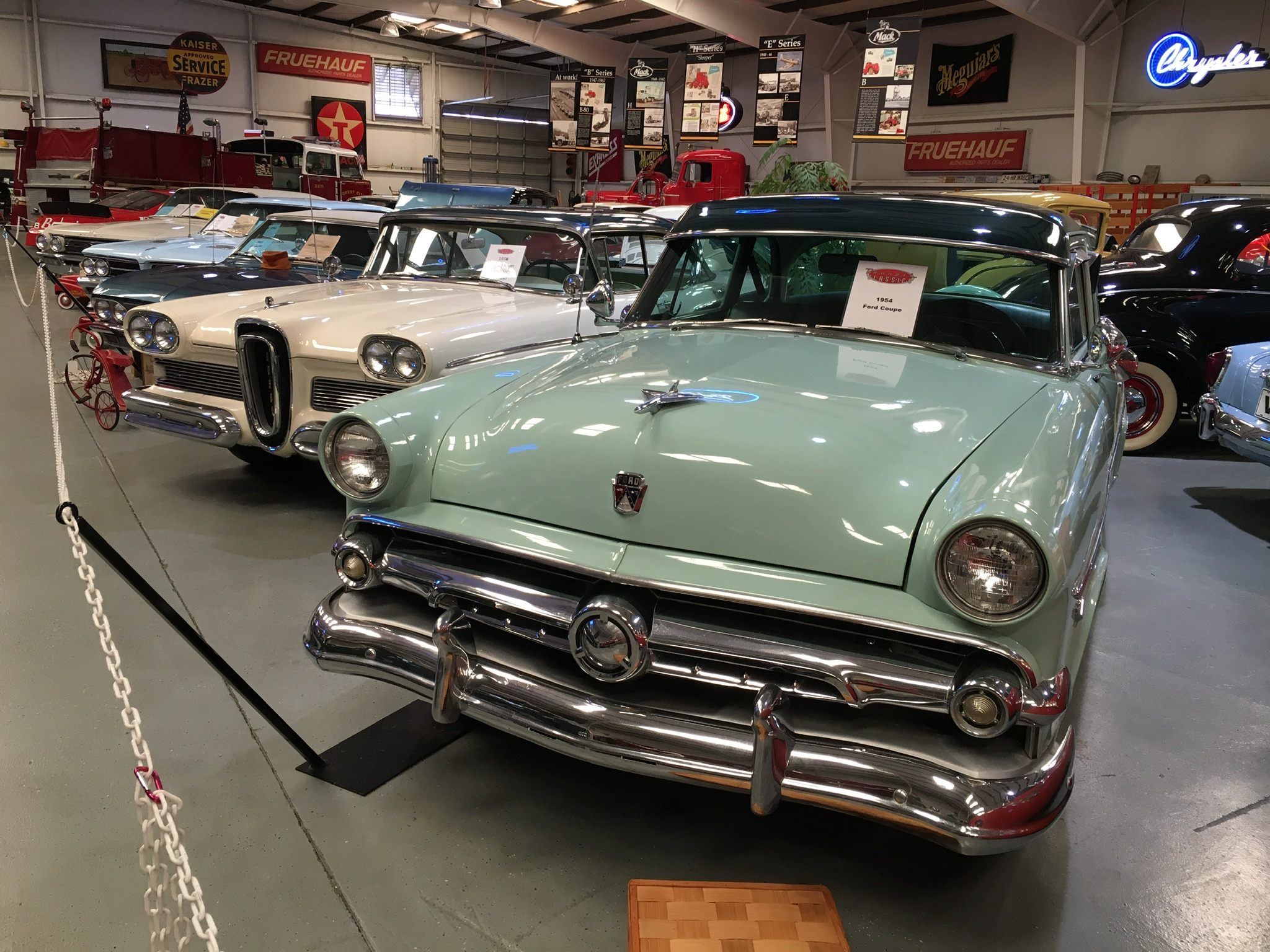
Classic cars in an American car museum

Cars produced in 1915 and older typically fall into the antique class, but the "classic" term is often applied loosely by owners to any car over 20 years old. There is some variation regarding the exact identification of a "classic car." Division by separate eras includes horseless carriages (19th-century experimental automobiles such as the Daimler Motor Carriage), antique cars (brass era cars which are defined by the Horseless Carriage Club of America (HCCA) as "any pioneer gas, steam or electric motor vehicle built or manufactured before 1 January 1916."), and classic cars (typically 1930s cars such as the Cord 812). Some also include muscle cars, with the 1974 model year as the cutoff.

In the United States, most states have time-based rules for defining "historic" or "classic" for legal purposes such as antique vehicle registration. Yet even requirements between states may vary, such as how Maryland defines historic vehicles as 20 years old or older, and they "must not have been substantially altered, remodeled or remanufactured from the manufacturer's original design". Separately, West Virginia simply defines motor vehicles manufactured at least 25 years before the current year as eligible for "classic" car license plates.

==== Classic Car Club of America ====
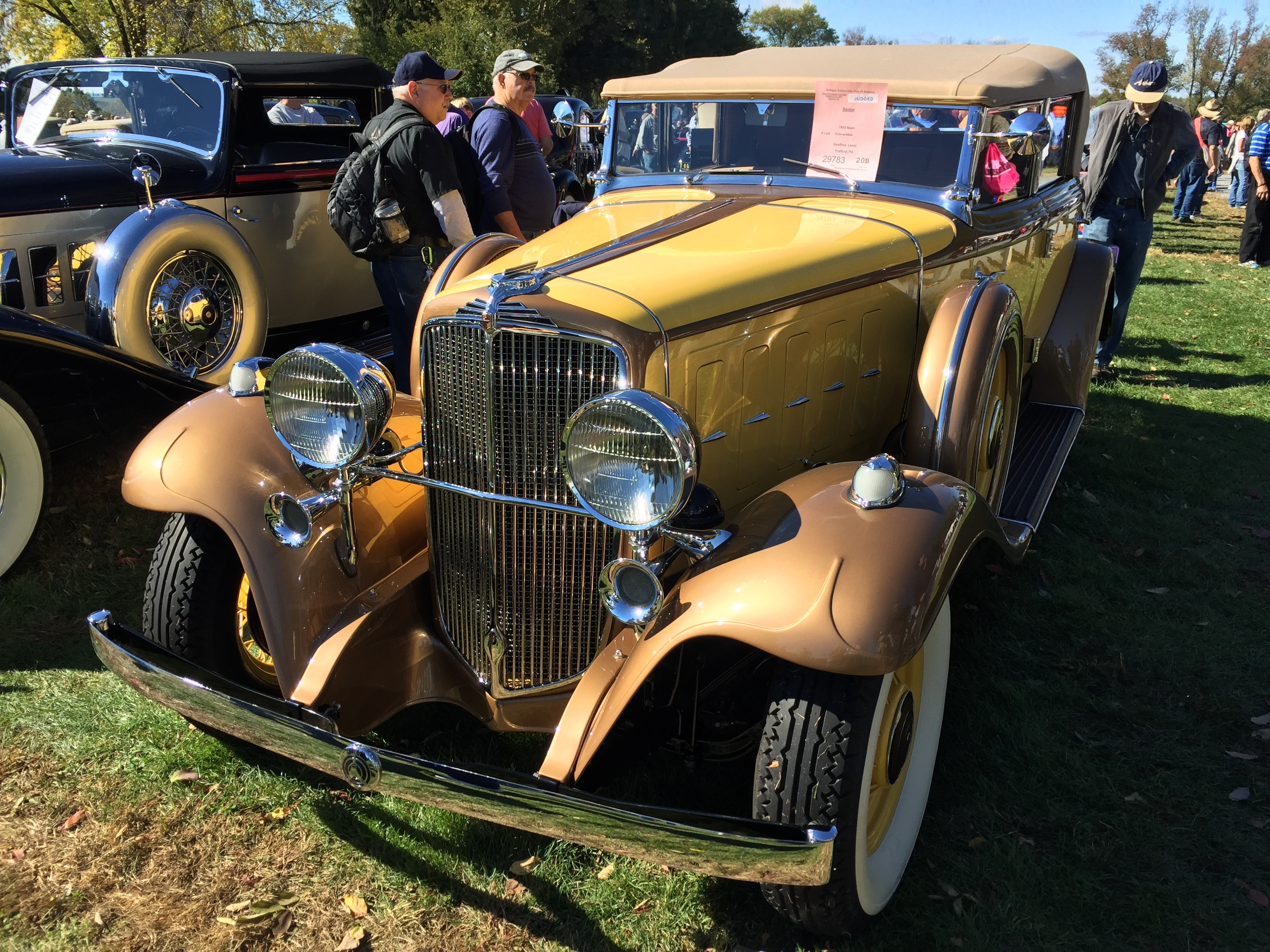
A 1932 Nash Advanced Eight, considered a full classic car

Sometimes the requirements for a car to be considered a classic are determined within a specific organization; they don't even have to be consistent across organizations within the same nation.

The Classic Car Club of America describes a CCCA Classic as a "fine" or "distinctive" automobile, either American or foreign, produced between 1915 and 1948. Specifically, the CCCA term "antique car" has been confined to "the functionally traditional designs of the earlier period" (mostly pre-war). They tended to have removable fenders, trunk, headlights, and a usual vertical grill treatment. In a large vehicle, such as a Duesenberg, Pierce-Arrow, or in a more diminutive form, the MG TC, with traditional lines, might typify the CCCA term. The CCCA maintains this definition of "classic car" and uses terms such as CCCA Classic or the trademarked Full Classic.

The CCCA is dedicated to preserving and enjoying select cars that "are distinguished by their respective fine design, high engineering standards, and superior workmanship." Other differentiating factors - including engine displacement, custom coachwork, and luxury accessories such as power brakes, power clutch, and "one-shot" or automatic lubrication systems - help determine whether a car is considered a CCCA Classic. The vehicles on their list "represent the pinnacle of engineering, styling and design for their era." The CCCA has estimated that 1,366,843 "American Classics" were built.

Any CCCA member may petition for a vehicle to join the list. Such applications are carefully scrutinized, but rarely is a new vehicle type admitted. Moreover, no commercial vehicles such as hearses, ambulances, or race cars can be accepted as a Full Classic.

==== Antique Automobile Club of America ====
The Antique Automobile Club of America (AACA) recognizes "motorized vehicles 25 years old or older, built in factories and specifically designed and manufactured for transportation use on public roadways and highways." The AACA evaluates such vehicles that are historical or that have "been restored to the same state as the dealer could have prepared the vehicle for delivery to the customer." Specified AACA classic vehicles include "fine or unusual domestic or foreign automobiles primarily built between and including the years 1925 and 1942."

The club is headquartered in Hershey, Pennsylvania. It was founded in Philadelphia in 1935 and moved its business office to Hershey in 1959; national headquarters and the AACA Library & Research center are now at 800 West Hersheypark Drive. The AACA Museum, a separate nonprofit that opened in Hershey in 2003, grew out of the same collector community and displays historic vehicles in period settings.

=== United Kingdom ===
The United Kingdom has no fixed definition of a classic car. However, there are two taxation issues that lead to people using them as cutoff dates. All cars built over 40 years ago are exempt from paying the annual road tax. Also, such cars are exempt from the yearly UK safety test known as the MOT test, on condition that no substantial changes have been made to the vehicle concerned; however, the car can still be presented for testing voluntarily. This is known as "Historic vehicle tax exemption." HM Revenue and Customs define a classic car for company taxation purposes as being over 15 years old and having a value over £15,000.

Additionally, widespread acclaim through car magazines can determine whether a particular vehicle is considered a classic. Still, the definition remains subjective and a matter of opinion.

=== Germany ===
In Germany, vehicles registered at least 30 years ago can apply for a special "Oldtimer" license plate with a €190/year flat tax. The cars are required to be in mostly original condition and a preservation-worthy appearance (grade C by popular car grading standards). At the same time, separate mandatory safety inspections establish the car's roadworthiness. Modifications that enhance safety (seatbelts, disc brakes) and environmental friendliness (catalytic converter, LPG conversion if invisible from the outside) are universally accepted. Other modifications are generally accepted as long as they are contemporary with the car's first registration (within 10 years before and after). The owner must provide historical proof, such as photographs, for verification. New paint jobs of any color are also accepted, including two-tone paint (if it was initially offered) and historic company logos—but no murals or custom patterns.

== Modern classics ==
Modern classic cars are generally older, ranging from 15 to 25 years old. However, these are not always accepted as classics to certain areas and groups around the world, such as the Antique Automobile Club of America. (Note: The German term youngtimer describes older vehicles that have not yet become "old timer" classic cars. "Neusäß: Schmankerl für Autoliebhaber: Oldtimer auf der Slalomstrecke - Nachrichten Augsburg-Land, Gersthofen, Neusäß - Augsburger Allgemeine". augsburger-allgemeine.de (in German). May 28, 2015.)

In the United Kingdom, the modern classic definition is often open to the discretion of Insurance Brokers and Insurance Companies who regard a Modern Classic as a vehicle considered collectible regardless of age. The usage of the car is limited to recreational purposes, and restricted mileage is also considered.

== Classic car styling ==
There was a worldwide change in styling trends in the immediate years after the end of World War II. For example, the 1946 Crosley and Kaiser-Frazer changed the traditional discrete replaceable-fender treatment. From then on, automobiles were designed with "envelope bodies" (Ponton cars) as a standard form.

== Fraud ==
Classic cars are subject to various types of fraud, most notably provenance fraud, where owners falsify documentation and serial numbers to make a car's history seem more colorful and historic. Fraud also assumes the form of knowingly inflating a car's estimated resale value, as was referenced in court proceedings relating to JD Classics, one of the UK's largest and best-known classic car dealers before its collapse in 2018.

== Emission levels ==
Classic cars are typically built to meet the national car emission levels that were present in the year of production of the vehicle. EU and US emission standards have increased in many countries since then. As a result, they may not be allowed to enter cities with special emission restrictions or low emission zones. Converting the car to run on a different fuel (i.e., SVO, LPG, CNG, hydrogen, ...) may decrease emission levels.

== Safety ==
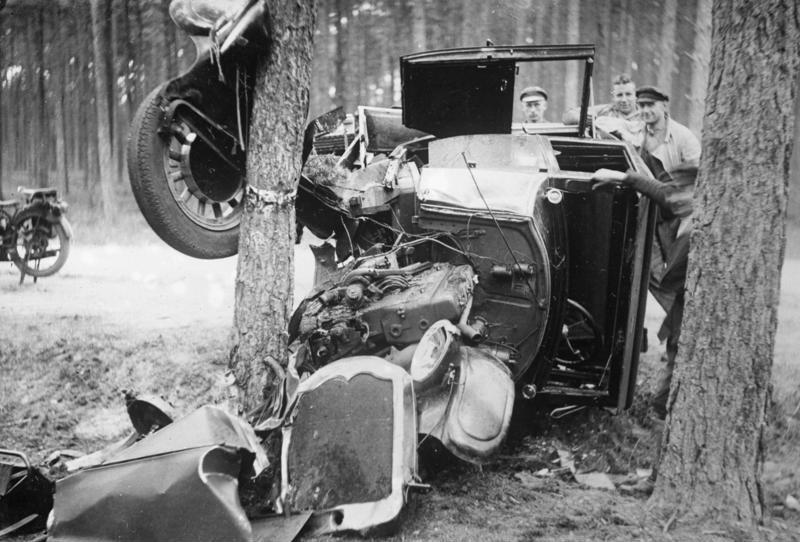
A car accident in Mecklenburg, Germany, in 1930

Classic cars often lack what are now considered basic safety features, including seat belts, crumple zones, or rollover protection. Vehicle handling characteristics (particularly steering and suspension) and brake performance are poorer than current standards, hence requiring greater road-awareness on the driver's part. In certain jurisdictions of the United States, using a classic car as a daily vehicle is strongly discouraged and may even be considered illegal in some places.

In September 2009, ABC News' Good Morning America and World News showed a U.S. Insurance Institute of Highway Safety crash test of a 2009 Chevrolet Malibu in an offset head-on collision with a 1959 Chevrolet Bel Air sedan. It dramatically demonstrated the effectiveness of modern car safety design over 1950s X-frame design, particularly of rigid passenger safety cells and crumple zones.

Retro-styled (color-coded with chromed buckles) 2-point and 3-point seat (safety) belts are manufactured according to Federal Motor Vehicle Safety Standards (FMVSS). However, most classic car bodies (manufactured before the late 1960s) did not include safety belts as standard equipment and did not include readily available reinforced mounting points on the vehicle body. Therefore, it can be problematic to install such equipment properly: specific studies and calculations should be performed before any attempts. Proper installation is critical, which means locating attachment points on the body/frame, assuring the strength by good reinforcement, and following the seat belt installation instructions properly to reduce the risk of malfunction or failure.

Some classic car owners are reluctant to retrofit seat belts for the loss of originality this modification implies. There have also been instances of cars losing points at shows for being retrofitted with seat belts.

Fitting modern tires is also a suggestion to improve the handling.

However, most modern tires may be much wider and have a lower profile than those used on classic cars when new. Therefore, they may interfere with suspension elements and damage the tire walls. The suspension of a classic car may not be suitable for radial ply tires, having been designed to accommodate bias ply tires only. Narrow classic car wheels may have been designed for narrow, high-profile tube tires and may be unsuitable for modern tubeless radial tires. Another problem with modern tires on classic cars is that increased grip requires increased steering effort; many classic cars do not have power steering. Many major tire companies have dedicated classic car tire marketing departments and will be able to give expert technical advice to address all these issues. It is critical to know how radial tires will affect the performance of a car originally fitted with bias-ply tires, and the considerations needed to compensate for the differences.

Upgrading braking using either bespoke parts, parts produced by the vehicle's manufacturer, from later versions of the same model, or later models that may be compatible with minor modification is an effective method of improving safety. Popular examples include drum brake to disc brake conversions, or adding a vacuum servo to cars with front disc brakes that did not initially have one.

Although they lack such advanced safety features as airbags, antilock braking systems, and other electronic controls, most US-market cars built in 1966 and later have basic safety features such as padded dashboards, seat belts, dual-circuit braking systems, and safety glass. A few of the newest classic cars (1980s and 1990s) have more advanced safety features such as airbags, anti-lock brakes, and side-impact beams. NHTSA began their 35 mph (56 km/h) full frontal crash test program in 1979, so these results are available for many post-1979 classic cars.

Despite these concerns, classic cars are involved in significantly fewer accidents.

== Market values ==
There is a difference between the valuation of general classic car models and the valuation of a specific classic car. For example, two examples of the same classic car model may have different market values depending on idiosyncratic factors such as mileage, service history, documentation, restoration quality, originality, participation in special events, distinctions and awards, and association with notable people. Regarding the valuation of different car models, it has been demonstrated that observable characteristics of aesthetics, rarity, engineering, and performance determine classic car model values. In addition, classic car marques play a critical role in the determination of model values and account for considerable variation in values, even after controlling for observable classic car attributes.

== See also ==
- Vintage (design)
- Vintage car
- Antique car
- Automotive restoration
- Barn find
- Shelby Cobra converted to hydrogen
- History of the automobile
- Historic Automobile Group
- Most expensive cars sold in auction
- Number matching
- Veteran car
- Modesto American Graffiti Festival
