= AACA Museum =

Transportation museum in Hershey, Pennsylvania, US

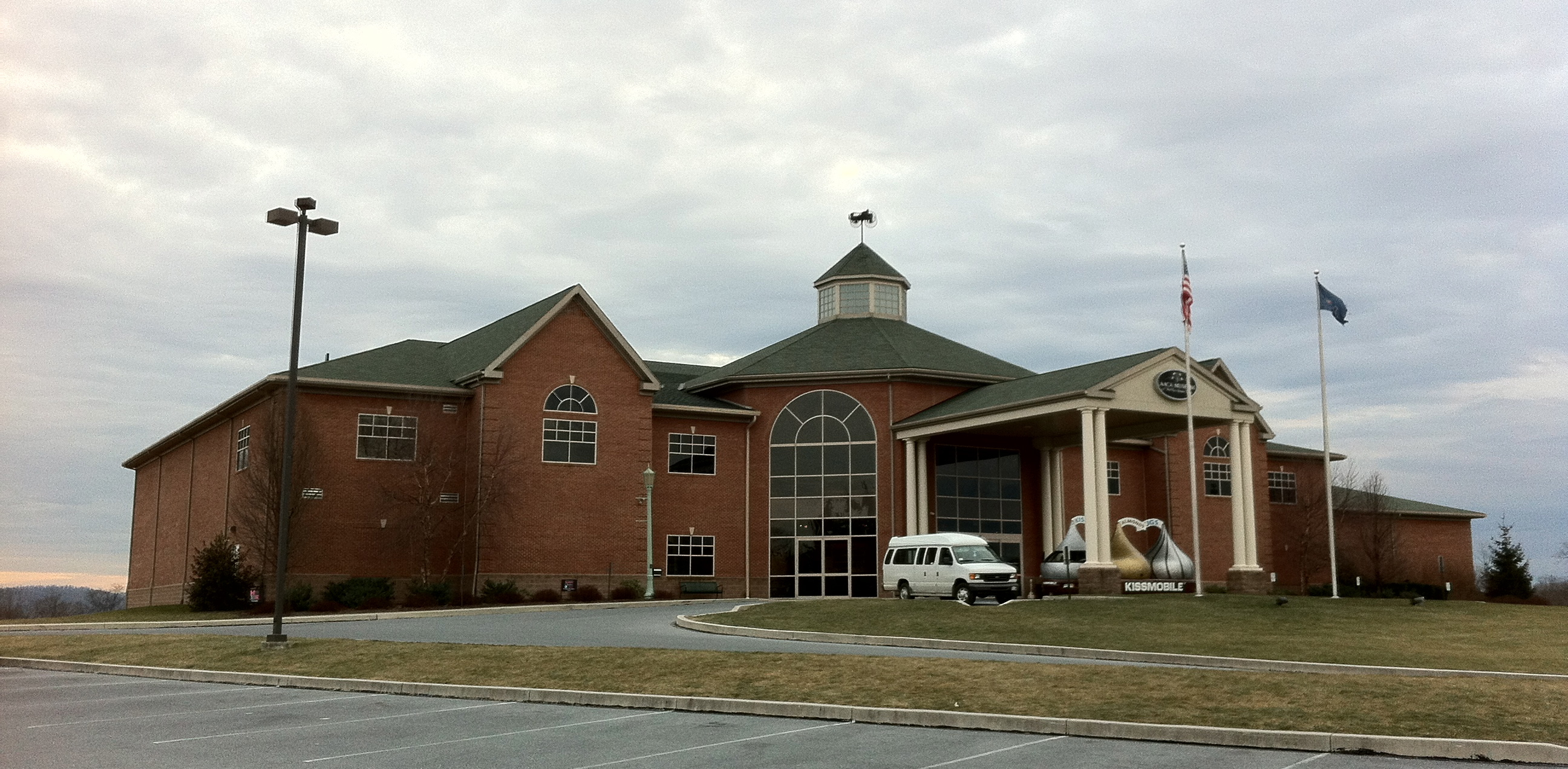
- The AACA Museum with the Hershey Kissmobile outside
- Established: 26 June 2003; 23 years ago
- Location: 161 Museum Drive; Hershey, PA
- Coordinates: 40°17′54″N 76°41′24″W
- Type: Transportation museum
- Collection size: 130
- Director: Jeffrey Bliemeister
- President: Richard Sills
- Website: www.aacamuseum.org

The AACA Museum is a transportation museum located in Hershey, Pennsylvania, in the United States. It is a 501(c)(3) non-profit museum dedicated to the preservation of American automobile history. Despite its name the museum is not affiliated with the Antique Automobile Club of America.

The 71,000 square feet (6,600 m^{2}) museum displays over 130 cars, buses, motorcycles, and automobile collectibles in themed settings from the 1890s–1980s. It is an affiliate museum of the Smithsonian Institution, and the American Alliance of Museums. Its major collections include the Cammack Tucker Collection, the world's most extensive collection of Tucker automobiles, and the Museum of Bus Transportation collection.

In 2014, the museum won the NAAMY Award of Excellence from the National Association of Automobile Museums.

== Collections ==
=== Cammack Tucker Collection ===
The AACA Museum holds the largest permanent collection of Tucker 48 automobiles in the world. Named for David Cammack, a historian and collector of Tucker automobiles, the entire collection was donated to the AACA Museum from Cammack's personal collection upon his death in 2013.

=== Museum of Bus Transportation Collection ===
Alongside the AACA grand opening in 2003, the Museum of Bus Transportation leased space in the museum's lower level to showcase their collection of 22 classic buses. As of 2020, the Museum of Bus Transportation owns roughly 33 buses, most of which are on display in the AACA Museum.

== History ==
AACA Museum, Inc. was formed in 1993 as a public charitable organization with a mission to construct a museum to preserve all forms of historical motor vehicles. In 1996, the incorporation purchased 25 acres of land in Hershey, Pennsylvania to be used as the site for the future museum building. Initial costs for the building were estimated at $11 million, and in 2000, the William J. Cammack Supporting Organization Trust pledged a multi-million dollar testamentary commitment, along with three 1947 Tucker Torpedo automobiles. Much of the rest of the fundraising was accomplished during the AACA annual car shows hosted in Hershey, Pennsylvania.

The museum opened on June 26, 2003, with roughly 70 cars donated, or on loan from, the club's members. Rather than display their cars in long rows, the AACA Museum incorporated an educational approach in its displays by adding scenery and set designs that complement the period in which each car was built.

In 2013, the museum was named as one of the 12 car museums in the USA worth a detour by MSNBC.

== Gallery ==
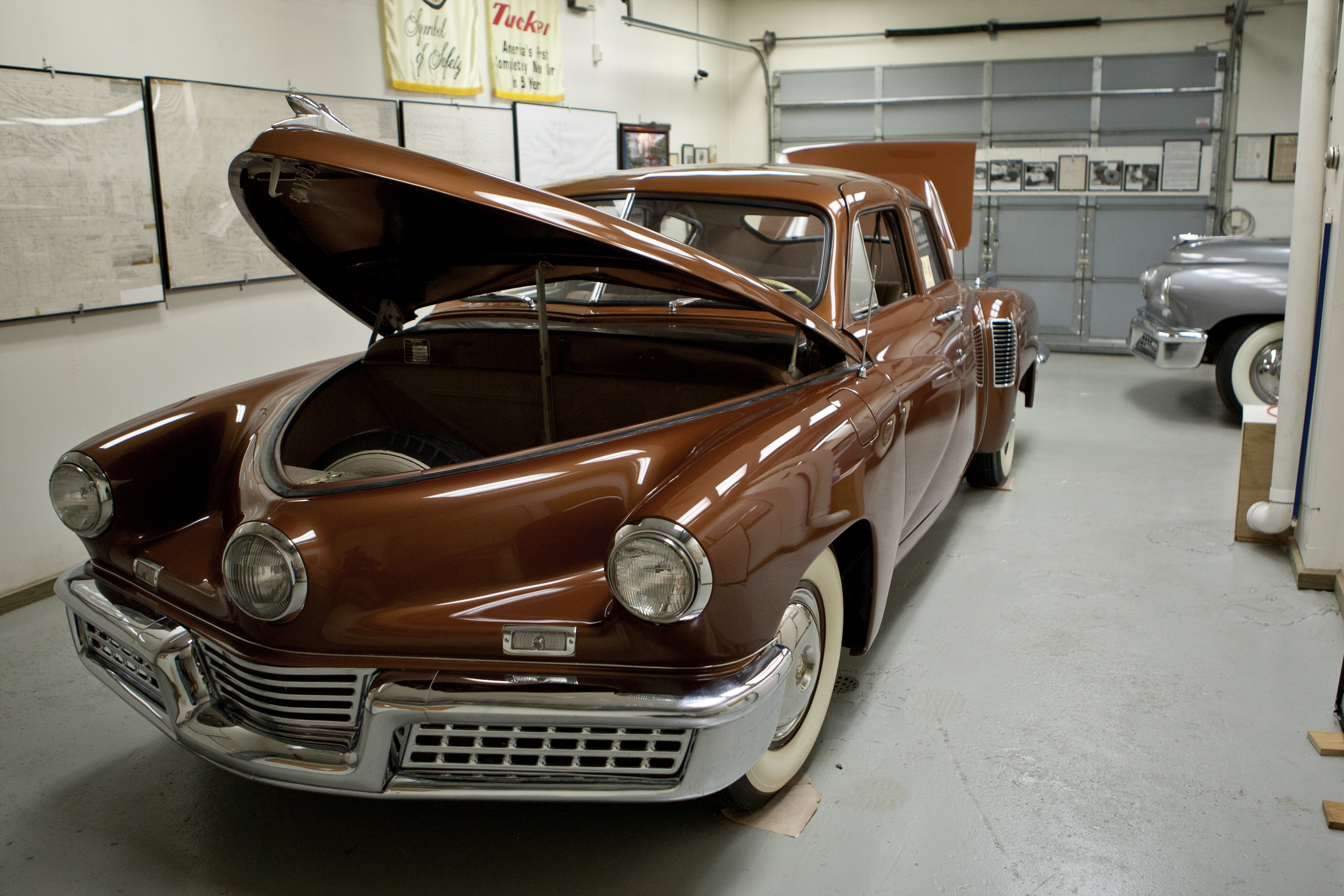
Tucker '48

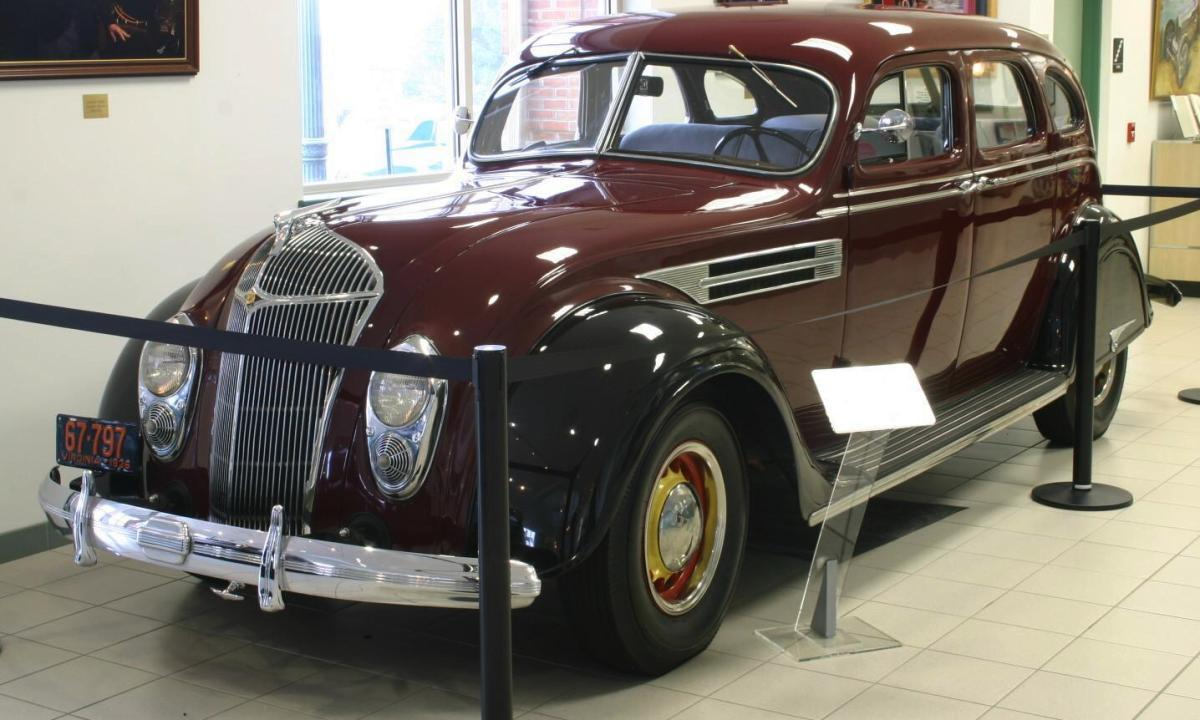
1936 Chrysler Airflow C-9

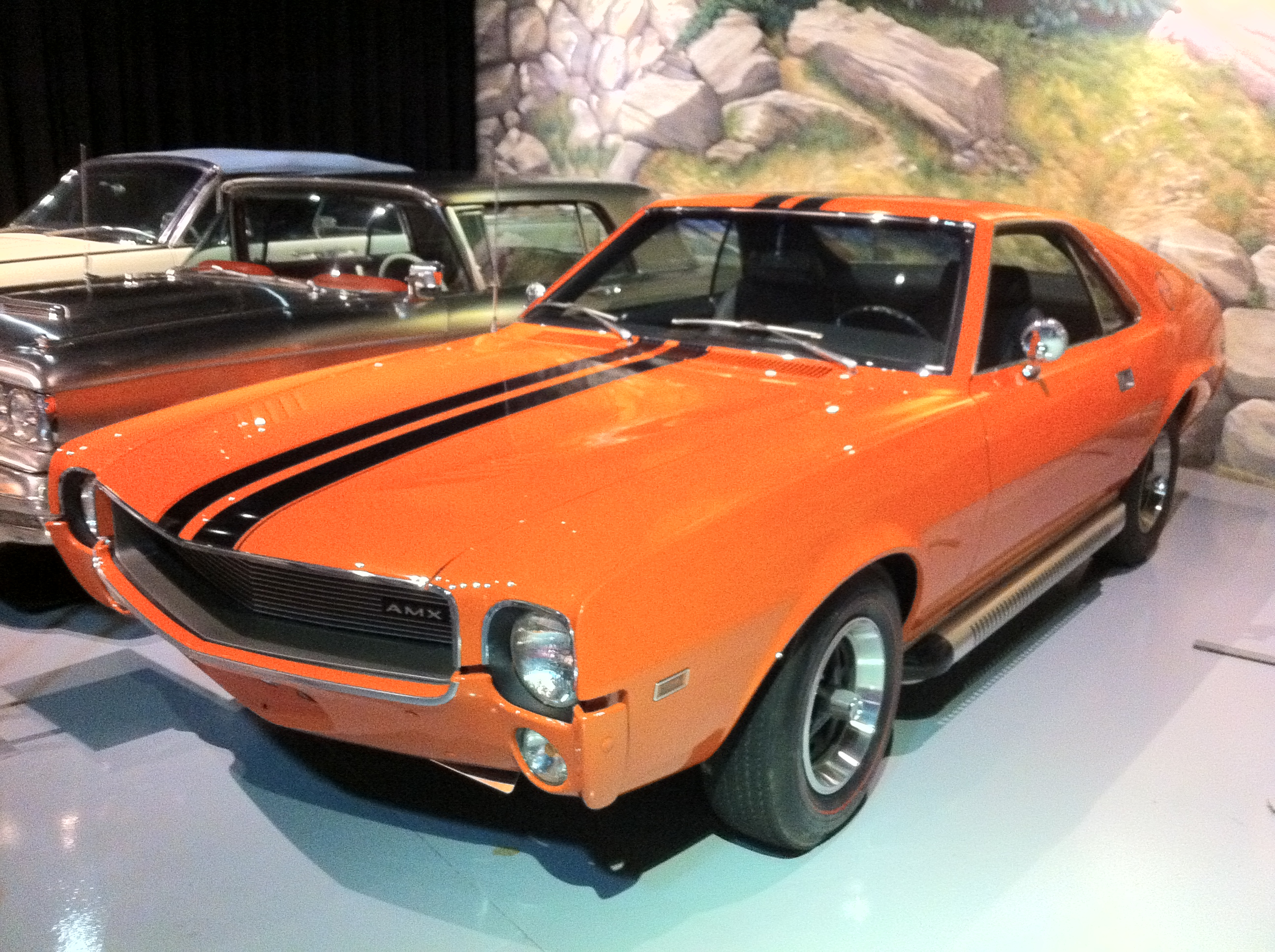
1969 AMX

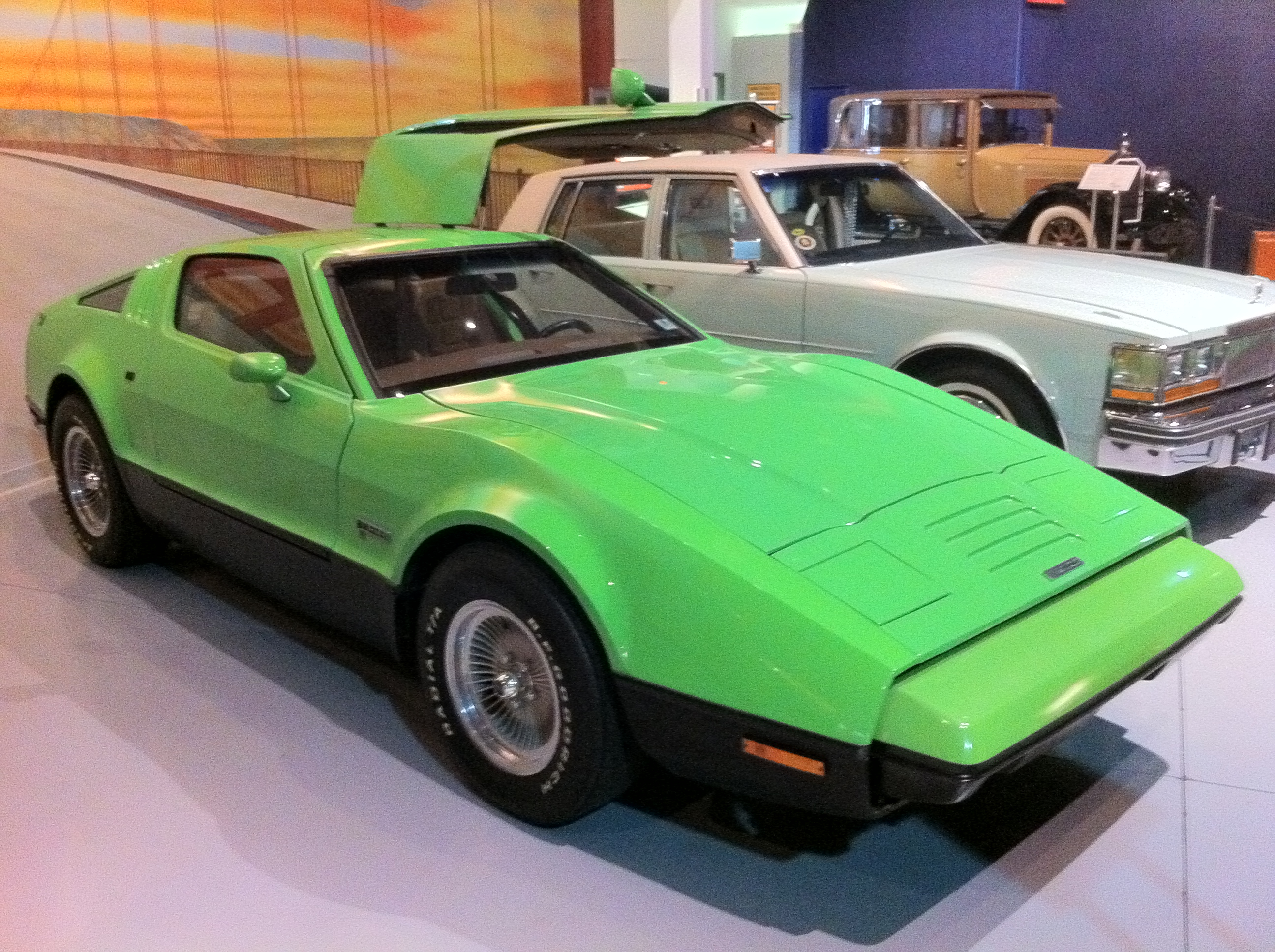
1974 Bricklin SV-1

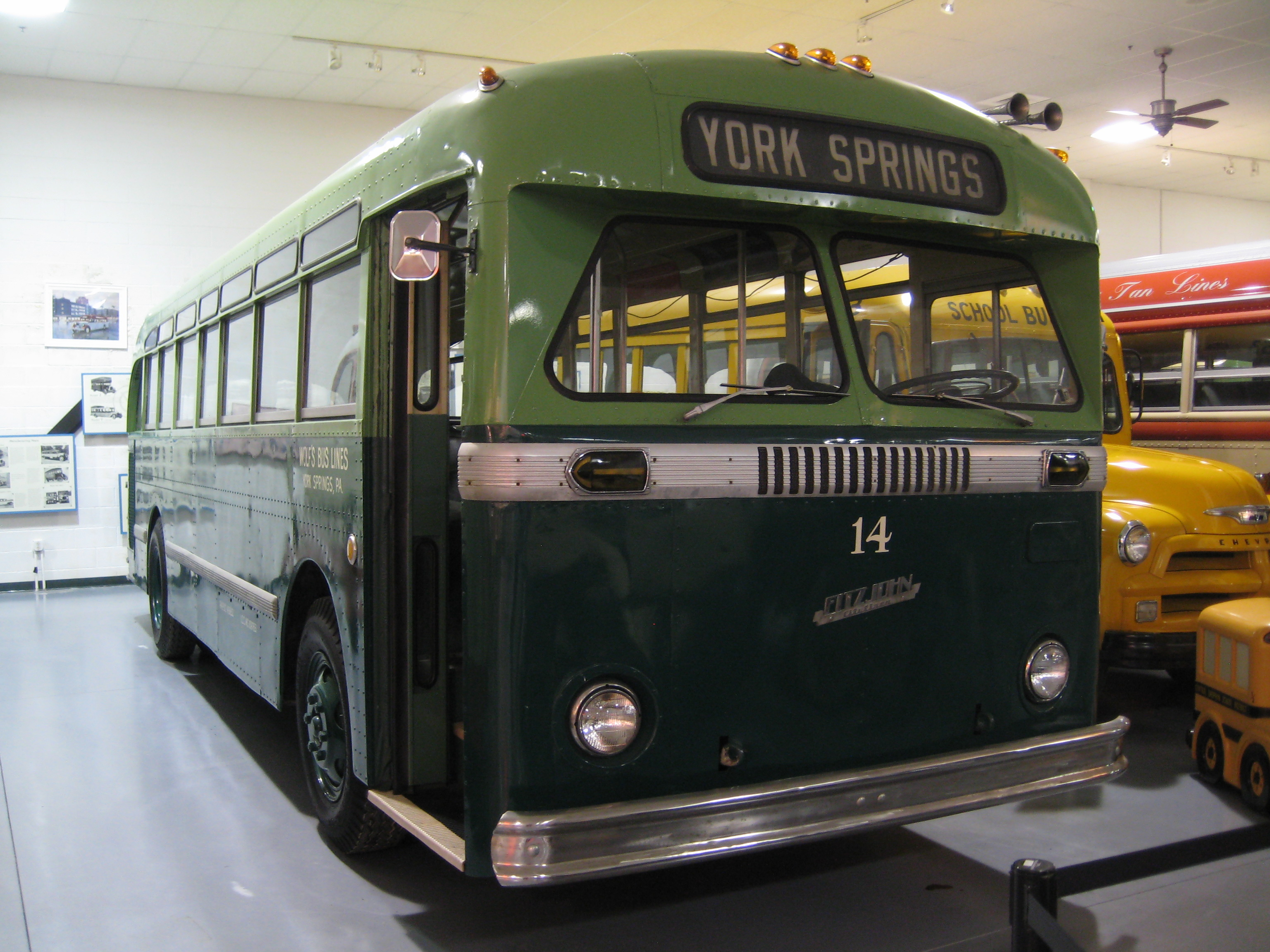
FitzJohn Bus

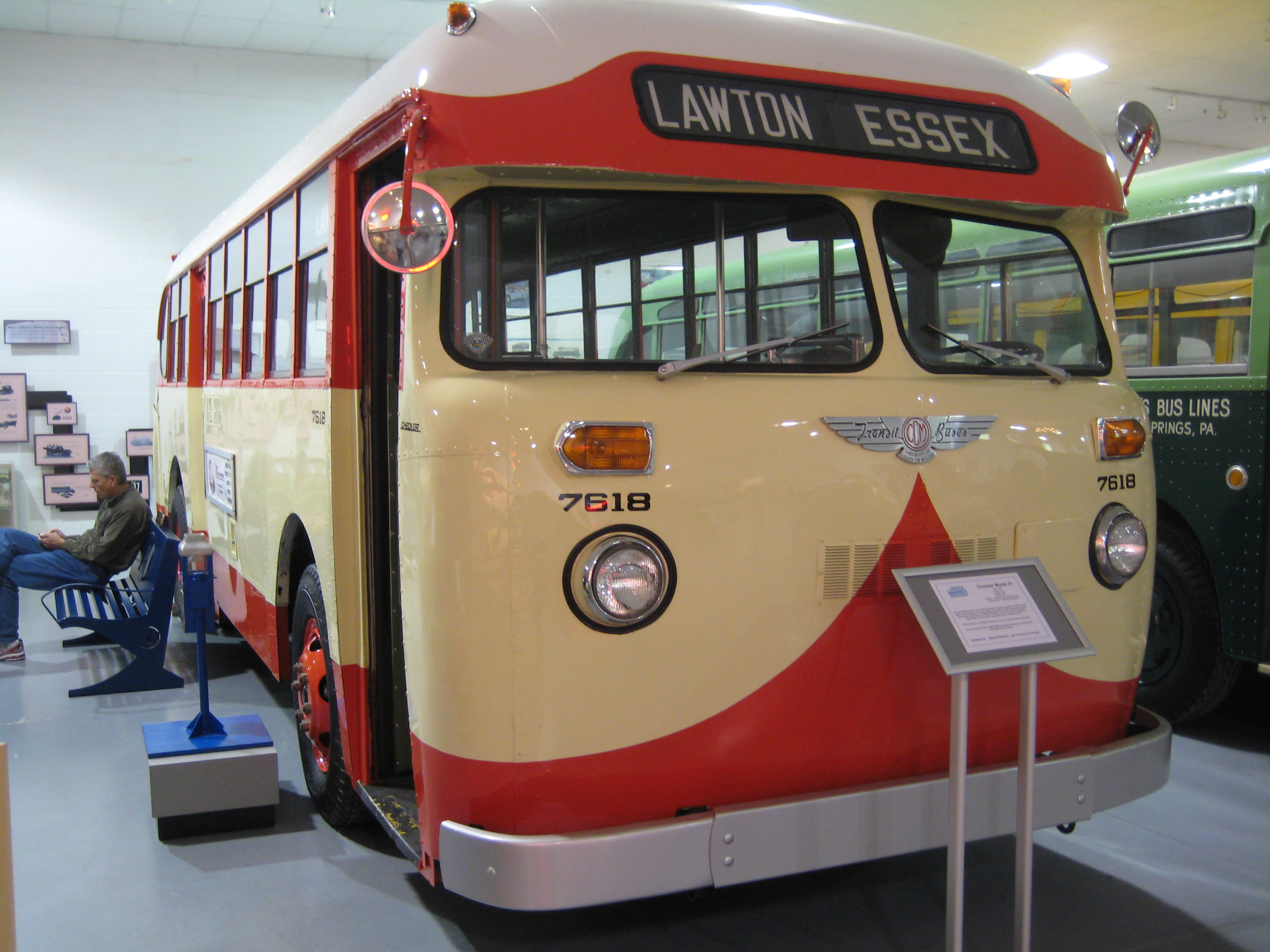
Checker Cab Bus
