= Antique car =

Automobile classed as an antique

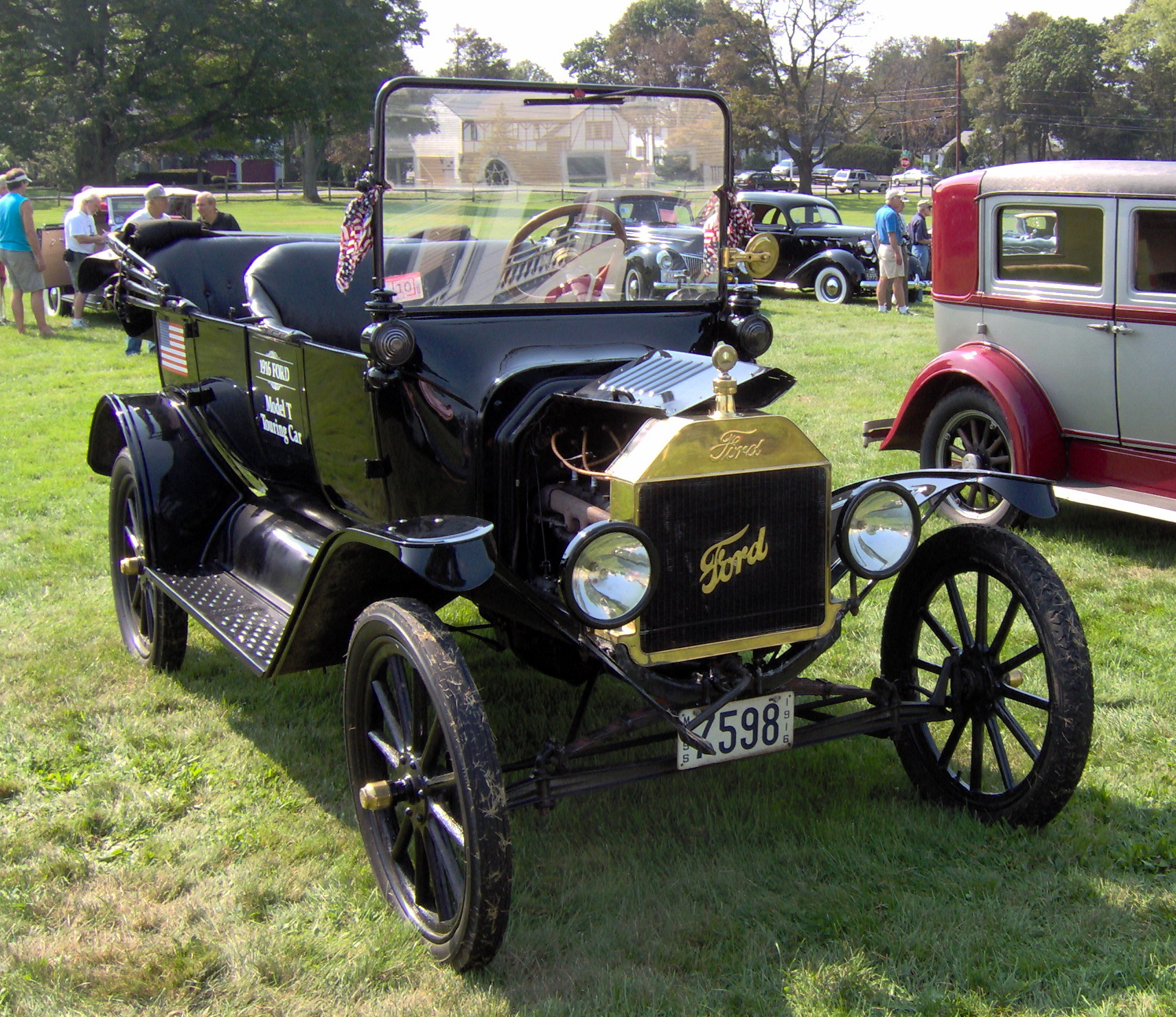
1916 Ford Model T

Definitions vary based on how old a car must be to qualify as an antique. The Antique Automobile Club of America defines an antique car as over 25 years of age. However, the legal definitions for the purpose of antique vehicle registration vary widely. The antique car era includes the Veteran era, the Brass era, and the Vintage era, which range from the beginning of the automobile up to the 1930s. Later cars are often described as classic cars. In original or originally restored condition antiques are very valuable and are usually either protected and stored or exhibited in car shows but are very rarely driven.

== History ==
The Veteran car era, Brass car era, and the Vintage car era, are part of the Antique car classification as all automobiles produced prior to World War I are considered to be antiques.

=== Europe ===
On Christmas Eve in 1801 Richard Trevithick of England demonstrated a steam-powered carriage, the Puffing Devil, that is considered the first horseless carriage, but Nicolas-Joseph Cugnot has the claim of the first steam-powered vehicle with the Fardier à vapeur in 1770. The first production of automobiles was by Carl Benz in 1888 in Germany and, under licence from Benz, in France by Emile Roger.

The time line is not exact but Thomas Davenport as well as Robert Anderson (of Scotland) built a battery electric car between 1832 and 1839.

=== United States ===
The era of automobiles began in the U.S. when George Selden of Rochester, NY filed a patent on May 8, 1879, but the patent was not approved until November 5, 1895. This was the first U.S. patent for an automobile. By the time a patent was approved many automobiles were in production. Charles Duryea built a three-wheeled, gasoline-powered vehicle in 1893, and his company built 13 cars of the same design in 1896. Gasoline automobiles were produced by Elwood Haynes in 1894, Ransom Olds in 1895, Charles King and Henry Ford in 1896. Automobile races stirred the public interest and bicycle and buggy manufacturers began to convert to making automobiles.

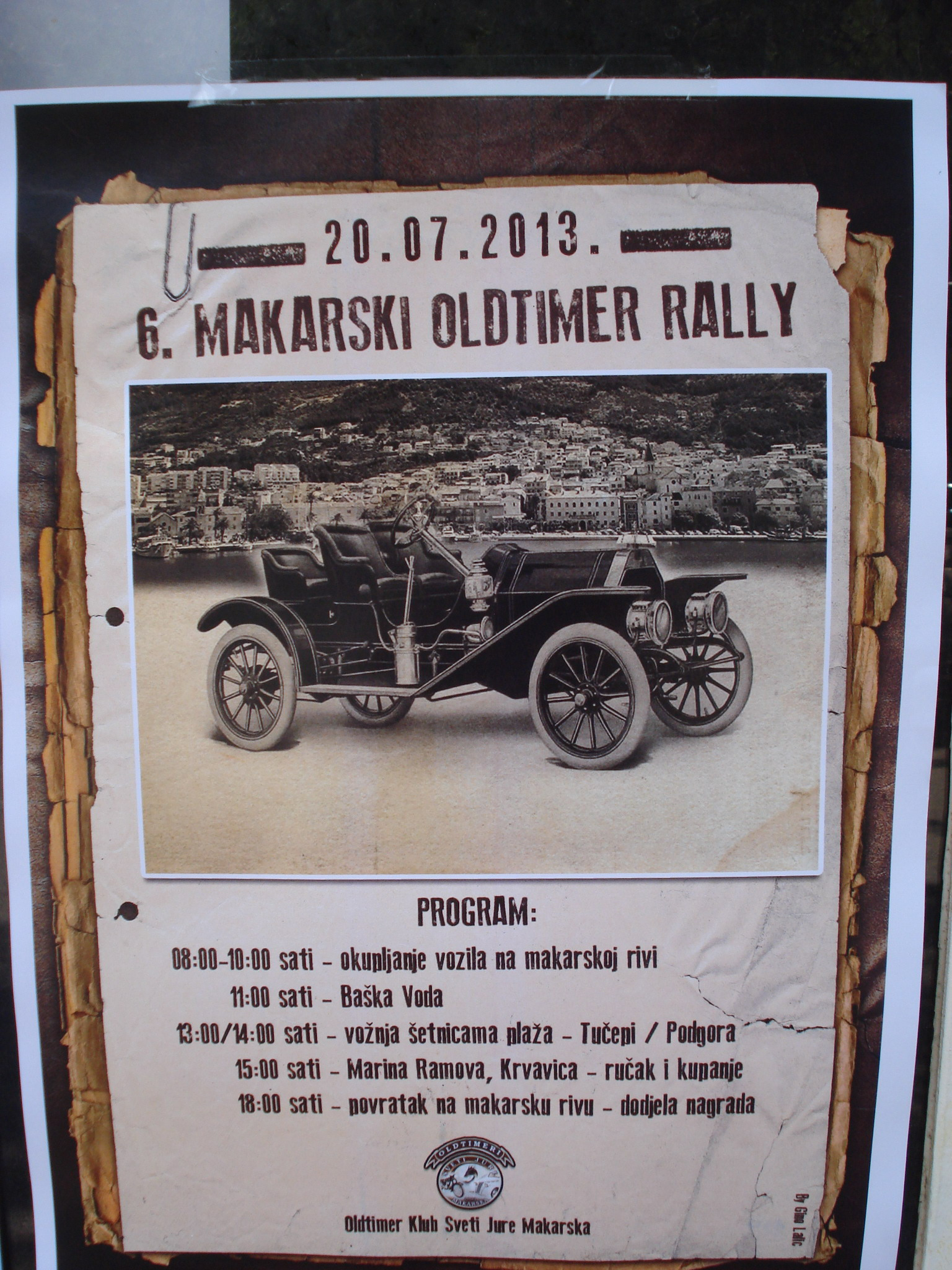
An antique car on a poster advertising a race in Makarska, Croatia

== Racing ==
Racing began shortly after the production of the automobile. The first official auto race in the world was a 732-mile, round trip race, in the Paris–Bordeaux–Paris race. The first race in the U.S. was the six car, 54.36 mile race, from Chicago's Jackson Park to Evanston, Illinois and back. Racing helped spur inventions that assisted in improvements to the automotive industry.

== Automobile production eras ==
=== United States ===
==== Veteran Era ====
The Veteran era began with the invention of the automobile and continued up to 1896.

==== Brass Era ====
The Brass Era is considered from 1890 to 1919. Periods of the Brass Era are referred to as the Horseless carriage era. The Horseless Carriage Club of America (HCCA) defines this era as "any pioneer gas, steam and electric motor vehicle built or manufactured prior to January 1, 1916".

==== Antique era (before 1920) ====
The era of antique cars actually covers a specific time period from the beginning up to 1920 or prior to World War I. The time period for antique cars includes the Veteran Era as well as the Brass era.

==== Vintage Era ====
The vintage era followed World War I from 1920 to 1930. There were over 500 automotive companies in 1910 but by the time of the Great Depression of 1929 only 60 had survived, and twelve years later there were fewer than 20.

=== United Kingdom ===
In the United Kingdom, the Brass era is split into two eras; the Veteran era and the Edwardian era.

==== Veteran Era ====
The veteran era includes cars produced before 1905.

==== Edwardian Era ====
The Edwardian era includes cars produced between 1 January 1905 and 31 December 1918. This is considered pre-World War One cars in the United States.

==== Vintage Era ====
The Vintage era is considered to cover cars made between 1918 and 1930.

==== Post Vintage Era ====
Post vintage cars are those made from 1 January 1931 to the start of World War II (September 1939).

==== Antique Era ====
Antique cars are all cars made up to September 1939 which marked the beginning of World War II.

==== Modern Era ====
Modern cars were made after 31 December 1959.

== See also ==
- Vintage (design)
- Vintage car
- Classic car
- Automotive restoration
- Antique vehicle registration
- Number matching
- Most expensive cars sold in auction
