= Historic Automobile Group =

London-based classic car investment research firm

- Type: Private
- Industry: Car investment research, alternative investments
- Founded: 2007; 19 years ago
- Founder: Dietrich Hatlapa
- Headquarters: London, United Kingdom
- Key people: Dietrich Hatlapa (founder); Bruce Johnson (co-founder); Hardeep Sohanpal (co-founder); Dave Selby (analyst)
- Products: HAGI Top Index, HAGI P Index, HAGI F Index, HAGI MBCI, HAGI LPS, HAGI BMW CI
- Website: historicautogroup.com

The Historic Automobile Group International (HAGI) is a London-based investment research firm specialising in the classic car market. Founded in 2007 by former ING Barings managing director Dietrich Hatlapa, the organisation produces a family of price indices that track rare and collectible automobiles as an alternative asset class, applying financial methodology of the kind traditionally used for share-price benchmarks. The HAGI Top Index, which covers fifty benchmark models from nineteen marques, has been cited by publications including the Financial Times, Bloomberg, CNN, the BBC, Reuters and Forbes. HAGI data serves as the official classic car component of the Knight Frank Luxury Investment Index and was used by the Credit Suisse Research Institute in its 2020 analysis of collectible assets.

== History ==
Hatlapa, originally from Hamburg, began his career in finance at Barings, moving to ING Barings where he rose to managing director, and later worked at Macquarie. His colleague at ING Barings, Bruce Johnson, was the bank's head of research and had extensive experience constructing stock indices for emerging markets—markets in which trading did not always take place on formal exchanges and where price transparency was limited. It occurred to Hatlapa, himself an owner of rare cars, that the same quantitative approach used to track company shares in illiquid markets could be applied to the opaque classic car market, where no reliable price benchmark existed.

Together with Johnson and a third co-founder, Hardeep Sohanpal, a publishing specialist, Hatlapa established HAGI in 2007. The idea was, as Hatlapa later explained to Road & Track, to "document this market" from a position of independence: "We are not involved in it, so we are market-neutral."

=== Early years and financial crisis ===
The company began publishing its first indices with a base date of 31 December 2008 and an inception value of £100. The indices launched in the immediate aftermath of the global financial crisis. By September 2009, when CNN's Quest Means Business profiled the venture, the HAGI Index had risen approximately 39 per cent from its inception. Der Spiegel noted that for 2009, the HAGI Porsche Index had risen 17.1 per cent and the overall HAGI Top Index 10.4 per cent.

CNBC reported on the firm that autumn, describing the index as an effort to bring "transparency" to a market that had lacked it, and identifying both Hatlapa and Sohanpal as co-founders. The BBC, covering the firm in September 2011, reported that annual returns for top-tier collector cars were running at roughly 12 per cent.

=== Growth and expansion ===
In 2011, Hatlapa published Better Than Gold: Investing in Historic Cars, a 350-page book that introduced the HAGI indices in detail and documented the classic car market as an asset class in a dedicated monograph (see Publications below).

The firm subsequently expanded its index family with marque-specific measures. The Mercedes-Benz Classic Index (HAGI MBCI) launched in 2012. The Lamborghini index (HAGI LPS), developed in partnership with Lamborghini Polo Storico, followed in 2018. A BMW Classic Index (HAGI BMW CI) was added in 2023. In 2014, HAGI inaugurated its annual VCCM conference series at the Tuck School of Business, Dartmouth College, bringing together collectors, investors and automotive industry executives (see Conferences below).

=== Personal involvement ===
Hatlapa himself is an active racer. He has driven a Porsche RS 60 Spyder that competed at the 1960 24 Hours of Le Mans with Carel Godin de Beaufort behind the wheel, and he drove it competitively at the Goodwood Revival in 2009. This personal connection to the market informs the firm's approach: Hatlapa has argued that cars in the HAGI segment derive their value from "a cocktail of things: rarity, technical sophistication, racing pedigree and continuing competitive success."

== HAGI indices ==
=== Methodology ===
The HAGI indices are market capitalisation-weighted price indices. Each constituent model's weight is determined by multiplying the average transaction price by the estimated number of surviving examples—an analogue to the way a conventional equity index uses share price multiplied by shares outstanding. The calculation follows the chained-Paasche method, the same type of chain-linked formula used in consumer price indices, and is updated at monthly intervals.

Transaction data is drawn from four categories of source: private contacts, marque specialists, dealers and auction results. According to an InvestmentNews report, approximately 70 per cent of the data comes from individual private transactions, with the remaining 30 per cent from auctions, distinguishing HAGI from indices that rely exclusively on public auction records. The firm states that its proprietary database spans a large number of verified transactions dating back to the 1970s.

Only cars assessed to be in excellent condition—what HAGI terms the "top condition segment"—are included. Provenance outliers, such as a car whose value is inflated by a celebrity former owner, are excluded so as not to distort the index. An index committee applies multiple parameters when deciding on inclusion, a process the firm has likened to that used by stock-market index providers. FamilyWealthReport described HAGI as having identified a concept it calls the "price corner"—the moment in a car's life cycle when it transitions from used car to genuine collectible, typically when values start to reflect rarity and provenance rather than depreciation.

Low mileage is treated as one of the most important value parameters, a point Hatlapa reiterated in a December 2025 interview with Focus, where he also stressed the importance of documented service histories and originality of components. Cars must be in "perfect mechanical and visual condition with proper documentation" to qualify for the segment tracked by the index.

The firm emphasises its independence from the market it measures. HAGI does not trade in cars or manage funds.

=== Published indices ===
As of 2026, HAGI publishes seven indices, all denominated in pounds sterling with inception values of £100:

Index	Scope	Inception
HAGI Top Index	50 benchmark models across 19 marques	December 2008
HAGI P Index	Porsche collector models	December 2008
HAGI F Index	Ferrari collector models	December 2008
HAGI Top ex P&F	HAGI Top ex. Porsche and Ferrari collector models	December 2008
HAGI MBCI	Mercedes-Benz collector models	2012
HAGI LPS	Lamborghini (in partnership with Polo Storico) collector models	2018
HAGI BMW CI	BMW collector models	2023

The Top Index initially tracked 38 models and was subsequently expanded to fifty. In Der Spiegel's early coverage, the three heaviest-weighted constituents were the Mercedes-Benz 300 SL Roadster, the Porsche Carrera GT and the Ferrari 250 GT SWB.

=== Performance ===
Various sources have compared returns on classic cars with those of major equity markets. Hatlapa told CNN in 2009 that over a thirty-year period, classic cars had outperformed the S&P 500 by more than two percentage points per annum. Der Spiegel reported that between 1980 and 2008, a diversified classic car portfolio had returned 12.6 per cent annually, compared with 10.8 per cent for the S&P 500.

The Credit Suisse Research Institute's 2020 survey of collectible assets, covering the period 2010 to 2020, found that the HAGI Top Index had delivered an annualised return of 12.0 per cent with a volatility of 10.1 per cent, giving it what the report described as the strongest risk-adjusted return among the collectible categories studied. Investopedia reported that between December 2008 and December 2021, the HAGI Top Index rose 264.49 per cent. A Tilburg University thesis found that the market had grown by more than 200 per cent between 2009 and 2016.

The years 2013 to 2015 were a period of particular strength. The South China Morning Post reported peak annual growth of over 45 per cent in 2013. Knight Frank noted a 25 per cent gain in the twelve months to September 2014.

During the COVID-19 pandemic, the classic car market showed resilience: Road & Track noted that all HAGI marque indices posted gains in March 2020, at a time when mainstream used-car values had dropped 17 per cent. The Spanish daily ABC reported a year-to-date gain of 4.11 per cent for 2020 as a whole, compared with a fall of more than 11 per cent in the Euro Stoxx 50.

More recently the market has softened. The HAGI Top Index has declined in recent years, according to company data. A December 2025 interview in Focus found Hatlapa reporting that some models had lost 20 to 30 per cent of their value since the turn of 2024–25, with mass-produced classics such as the Mercedes-Benz SL "Pagoda" and standard Porsche 911 variants particularly affected. Hatlapa attributed part of the downturn to a generational shift in buyer preferences: younger collectors from Generation X and Generation Z increasingly favour models from the last four decades, while cars from the 1950s, 1960s and earlier are becoming a niche market.

=== Market characteristics ===
Hatlapa has characterised the classic car market as "structurally illiquid", noting that while cars retain intrinsic value and cannot "go bust" the way a company's shares can, sellers who need to liquidate quickly may be at a disadvantage. A FamilyWealthReport article quoted HAGI analyst Dave Selby as noting that some prices had not recovered to their 1989 peak more than twenty years later, and that the Ferrari segment in particular has "always attracted an element of speculation." The market also endured a speculative bubble and subsequent crash in the early 1990s—an episode Hatlapa documented in Better Than Gold and which Der Spiegel described as the period from 1990 to 1994, referring to it as the "Internet bubble of the classic car market."

CNBC, in a March 2024 feature on the future of electric vehicles in the collector market, reported on the emerging question of whether EVs would eventually join established combustion-engine marques in the collectible segment. HAGI data was cited in the context of tracking these developments.

The cost of restoring collector cars has itself become a factor in the market. Hatlapa told Knight Frank in 2018 that "the cost of a complete restoration can now be factored into prices."

== Adoption and media coverage ==
=== Knight Frank Luxury Investment Index ===
HAGI supplies the classic car data for the Knight Frank Luxury Investment Index (KFLII), a benchmark that compares returns across ten categories of luxury asset including art, wine, watches, jewellery and coloured diamonds. Knight Frank's own reports identify HAGI as the specialist data source for classic cars alongside other sector providers such as Art Market Research and Wine Owners. The Knight Frank Wealth Report, published annually, includes a dedicated classic car section drawing on HAGI data and has occasionally featured commentary from Hatlapa; the 2016 edition quoted him directly on market conditions.

Reuters described HAGI in 2023 as the organisation "which supplies the sector data used by Knight Frank", quoting Hatlapa's scepticism about the viability of classic car investment funds: "We've seen more than 100 attempts at setting up funds in the past. Nobody managed to build both a diversified investor base and a diversified car portfolio."

=== Credit Suisse ===
In 2020 the Credit Suisse Research Institute published a 72-page study of collectibles as an asset class, using HAGI data as the sole source for classic car returns and index methodology. The report placed HAGI alongside established benchmarks such as the Liv-ex wine index and Art Market Research indices, and concluded that, on the report's metrics, classic cars had produced the strongest risk-adjusted return among the collectible categories examined over the preceding decade. The LUISS thesis on classic car investment described the HAGI indices as one of the three most prominent classic car indices, alongside the Hagerty indices and Kidston's K500 index.

=== Financial media ===
HAGI's indices have been referenced by a range of international financial publications. The HAGI Top Index was published on FT.com (the Financial Times' wealth section) and on Die Welt online for the German-speaking market. It currently appears monthly in Octane magazine with a column called "Value Tracker".

Hatlapa has been quoted as a market commentator by Bloomberg, CNBC, Forbes, the Financial Times, the South China Morning Post and Der Spiegel, among others. In 2024, the Financial Times cited Hatlapa on the emerging hypercar segment: "The biggest damage to value is mileage—a lot of these cars never see the road."

Investopedia uses the HAGI Top Index as its primary reference for collector-car returns, alongside Hagerty. In a 2024 Forbes article ranking five categories of collectible investment, HAGI was placed alongside WatchCharts, the AMR Art Index and the Liv-ex wine index as the benchmark for its sector. The South China Morning Post, covering the Asian luxury market, has cited HAGI data in articles on collector cars in both 2017 and 2019.

== Publications ==
=== Better Than Gold ===
In 2011, Hatlapa published Better Than Gold: Investing in Historic Cars, Introducing the HAGI Classic Cars Indices. The hardcover book runs to 350 pages and contains more than 200 photographs of collector cars, along with price performance charts and fourteen appendices of price-relevant data. Its four main sections cover the history and structure of the classic car market, the size of the market, value drivers, and a comparative analysis of price movements in the Ferrari, Mercedes-Benz and Porsche segments. The book also documents the classic car investment bubble of the late 1980s and early 1990s.

Published by HAGI Publishing (ISBN 978-0-9568644-0-6), the book was issued in a second edition in 2014.

Sona Blessing, in the Wiley Finance volume Alternative Alternatives: Risk, Returns and Investment Strategy (2011), discussed HAGI's work in the context of collectibles as alternative investment strategies, devoting several pages to the index methodology and the broader case for collector cars as a portfolio diversifier.

=== Other titles ===
Through its HAGI Publishing imprint, the firm has also issued The Porsche Carrera 4 Cam Engines by Peter Pohl, a hardcover devoted to the four-cam engines designed by Ernst Fuhrmann.

== Conferences and academic engagement ==
Between 2014 and 2017, HAGI organised an annual conference titled Value in the Classic Car Market (VCCM) at the Tuck School of Business, Dartmouth College.

In June 2015, HAGI held a separate event, the Classic Car Symposium Cologne (CCSC), in cooperation with the Cologne University of Applied Sciences (Technische Hochschule Köln) and Professor Frank Hermann of the university's Institute for Vehicle Technology (IFK). Mercedes-Benz Classic served as founding partner for both the VCCM and CCSC conference series.

HAGI's data and methodology have been cited in academic research at a number of universities. Theses at LUISS Guido Carli in Rome and Tilburg University in the Netherlands have drawn on the HAGI indices as a primary data source for analysing collector-car returns. A 2014 study by Mische and Spizzirri compared HAGI index holding-period returns with those of the S&P 500, while Stephen G. Martin cited the indices in a 2016 paper. The firm reports cooperation with universities on academic research including doctoral dissertations.

== Advisory council ==
HAGI's advisory council has included figures from the automotive and financial industries. The automotive historian Karl Ludvigsen (born 1934), whose career spanned senior positions at General Motors, Fiat and Ford, and who is the author of numerous books on automotive history, served on the council. Financial members included Fergus MacLeod, who was head of investor relations at BP before becoming a senior vice president at Aramco, and Philip Basil, former chief executive of RBS Asset Management.

== See also ==
- Alternative investment
- Classic car
- Knight Frank Luxury Investment Index
- Hagerty
- Paasche index
