= Karl Ludvigsen =

American writer (born 1934)

- Born: Karl E. Ludvigsen; April 24, 1934 (age 92); Kalamazoo, Michigan
- Education: Pratt Institute
- Occupation: Writer
- Relatives: Elliot "Lud" Ludvigsen (father); Barbara Gaines (daughter-in-law)
- Writing career
- Genre: Automotive journalism
- Website: www.karlludvigsen.com

Karl E. Ludvigsen (born April 24, 1934) is a journalist, author, and historian of motorsport and the automotive industry.

== Personal life ==
Karl E. Ludvigsen was born on April 24, 1934, in Kalamazoo, Michigan. He was the son of Elliot "Lud" Ludvigsen, an engineer and executive of Eaton Corporation.

Karl Ludvigsen has been resident in England since 1980 and lives in Suffolk with his wife Annette.

== Education ==
He graduated Cum Laude from Phillips Exeter Academy, and attended both the Massachusetts Institute of Technology, studying engineering, and Pratt Institute where he matriculated in industrial design.

== Career ==
=== Military service ===
In 1958–59, he served in the US Army Signal Corps in West Germany.

=== Automotive industry ===
Ludvigsen worked as a designer at General Motors in 1956, Ludvigsen planned experimental front-drive prototypes. He also worked on the design and development of heavy-duty truck transmissions in the engineering and experimental departments of the Fuller Manufacturing, a subsidiary of the Eaton Corporation. As a public-affairs official with General Motors Overseas Operations in the 1960s, Ludvigsen was responsible for all the company's product information outside the USA. He also supervised its financial advertising abroad. Prior to that, he assisted the General Motors technical staffs in press relations, with special emphasis on the Styling Staff.

When Ludvigsen was president of Formula 1 Enterprises, an importer and distributor of motor vehicle equipment, several of his friends were injured in motor racing accidents. This led him and his company to become active in racing safety at the end of the 1960s. Ludvigsen helped invent the practical modern Halon-gas fire extinguishing system for racing vehicles and founded the Motor Racing Safety Society to bring together professionals working in this field.

At the end of the 1970s, Ludvigsen joined Fiat Motors of North America as vice president of corporate affairs, with responsibilities including legal affairs and relations with customers, dealers, governments and the press. He took part in the product development of Fiat and Lancia cars both in the US and Turin. His team obtained unprecedented public awareness for Fiat, Lancia, and Ferrari products in the United States and successfully launched the Fiat Strada range.

In 1980, Ludvigsen joined Ford of Europe as a vice president. One of his briefs for Ford included government affairs. This included European governmental assessments and lobbying activities, as well as the preparation and presentation of Ford's External Factors Study, a ten-year rolling forecast of the external environment within which Ford would operate in Europe.

Another Ford of Europe responsibility for Ludvigsen was Ford's European motor sports activity. This encompassed the design, engineering, tooling, production, marketing, distribution and sale throughout Europe of special automobiles, light trucks and parts. He was in charge of the design and launching of the RS1600i Escort, which was named Motor Sports Car of the Year in France and which led Ford's RS Products operation to record profitability. In addition, Ludvigsen played a key role in the creation of the AC-Ghia and Barchetta prototype sports cars.

=== Writing career ===
Ludvigsen began his automotive writing and editing for MIT's Tech Engineering News in 1953. He has served as technical editor of both Auto Age and Sports Cars Illustrated, east coast editor of Motor Trend and editor of Car and Driver.

As an author, co-author or editor Ludvigsen has some four dozen books to his credit. Four Ludvigsen books concern the Chevrolet Corvette, one of them that was credited with sparking the Corvette hobby. He has written three times about Mercedes-Benz, twice about its racing cars. His books on the latter subject have won the Montagu Trophy (once) and the Nicholas-Joseph Cugnot Award (twice), (Note: Battle for the Beetle (2001) & Ferdinand Porsche, Genesis of Genius: Road, Racing and Aviation Innovation, 1900 to 1933 (2009)) both recognizing outstanding automotive historical writing. In 2001 he again received the Cugnot award from the Society of Automotive Historians (SAH) for his book about the early years of the Volkswagen, Battle for the Beetle. In 2002, he was named a Friend of Automotive History by the SAH, the Society's highest award.

Since 1997, Ludvigsen has been drawing on the photographic resources of the Ludvigsen Library to write and illustrate books on the great racing drivers. His first title in this series was Stirling Moss: Racing with the Maestro. He followed this with Jackie Stewart: Triple-Crowned King of Speed and Juan Manuel Fangio: Motor Racing's Grand Master. Fourth in this series for Haynes Publishing was Dan Gurney: The Ultimate Racer and fifth was Alberto Ascari: Ferrari's First Double Champion. Sixth and seventh in the series are Bruce McLaren—Life and Legacy of Excellence and Emerson Fittipaldi—Heart of a Racer.

Also in the field of motor sports, Karl Ludvigsen has written about the cars of the Can-Am series, the AAR Eagle racing cars, the Ford GT40s and Prime Movers, the story of Britain's Ilmor Engineering. His introduction to At Speed, a book of Jesse Alexander's racing photography, won the Ken W. Purdy Award for Excellence in Automotive Journalism. Other motor-sports titles include Classic Grand Prix Cars, a history of the front-engined G.P. car, and Classic Racing Engines, Ludvigsen's personal selection of 50 notable power units.

Karl Ludvigsen is the author of definitive histories of Porsche and Opel. His Porsche history, Excellence was Expected, is considered to be a model of the researching and writing of the history of an auto company. The updated edition was published in three volumes by Bentley Publishers in 2003. In 1997, Ludvigsen researched and wrote the catalogue for a special exhibition of Ferrari technological innovations on the occasion of the company's 50th anniversary and contributed a major section to the company's official 50-year history. He updated and expanded this work for Ferrari's 60th anniversary in 2007. He is the author of a series of monographs on great Maserati cars.

In co-operation with publisher Iconografix, Ludvigsen has established a series of photographic books now numbering some nineteen titles, including books on Indy racing cars from the Speedway's first contest in 1911 through the 1970s, the Indy Novis, Chevrolet's Corvair and Corvette, the Mercedes-Benz 300SLs of 1952 and 1954–64, the Porsche Spyders and Porsche 917, the Ferrari Factory, Can-Am racing cars, the sports-racers of Briggs Cunningham and Jim Hall's Chaparral cars. More titles are in preparation.

On motor-industry topics Karl Ludvigsen has written books about high-performance engines, the Wankel rotary engine and the histories of American auto makers. He was editor of The Future of the Automobile, the report of the 1981–84 study of the world auto industry by MIT. This was named one of the best business books of the year by Business Week. In the 1980s, he established Euromotor Reports Limited, for which he wrote and edited numerous research studies.

=== Collections ===
Ludvigsen has collected his library of the same name throughout his career and it now holds extensive original negatives and transparencies from the 1950s forward with special strengths in motor sports, American cars and sports cars. As well it holds original photos and glass negatives from the dawn of the automotive era.

=== Consulting and later career ===
In 1996, publishers in Britain and the United States launched Karl Ludvigsen's book on motor-industry management, Creating the Customer-Driven Car Company. It advises industry personnel on customer-pleasing best practice researched during 15 years of in charge of a London-based motor-industry management consultancy, which he founded in 1983. Ludvigsen and his team worked for most of the world's leading motor manufacturers in strategic planning, brand reinforcement, distribution, company structure and organization, mergers and acquisitions, and on design and engineering issues.

From 1980 through 1984, Ludvigsen was a member of the Policy Forum of the MIT Future of the Automobile Programme, the most comprehensive trilateral study of the motor industry ever undertaken. He also chaired the Auto & Transport Design Forum, an international conference on design and transport infrastructures held in Lugano, Switzerland and Stuttgart, Germany. His tutorial responsibilities have included the Syracuse University, The Royal College of Art and the Bavarian Academy of Advertising.

Ludvigsen has been a Member of the Society of Automotive Engineers (SAE) since 1960 and has been active on both Standards and Activities Committees of the SAE. He is currently a member of the Historical Committee. He is a founder member of the International Motor Press Association and a member of the Society of Automotive Historians, the Society of Authors, the Society for the History of Technology and the Guild of Motoring Writers. Ludvigsen is an honorary member of the Vintage Sports Car Club of America and the Corvair Society of America. He is also a member of the council of the Historic Automobile Group.

Currently, he writes for Road & Track, Automobile Quarterly, The Automobile and Hemmings Sports & Exotic Cars, among others, plus various one-make periodicals and website publications Winding Road and Just-Auto.com.

He publishes the Substack Why Cars Are So Bad

== Books ==
- Creating the Customer-Driven Car Company. International Thomas Business Press, 1996. ISBN 978-0412737602.
- Stirling Moss: Racing with the Maestro. Patrick Stephens Limited, 1997. ISBN 978-1852605643.
- Jackie Stewart: Triple-Crowned King of Speed. Sparkford, UK: Haynes Publishing, 1998. ISBN 978-1859604366.
- Juan Manuel Fangio: Motor Racing's Grand Master. Sparkford, UK: Haynes Publishing, 1999. ISBN 978-1859606254.
- Dan Gurney: The Ultimate Racer. Sparkford, UK: Haynes Publishing, 2000. ISBN 978-1859606551.
- Alberto Ascari: Ferrari's First Double Champion. Sparkford, UK: Haynes Publishing, 2000. ISBN 978-1859606803.
- Battle for the Beetle. Cambridge, MA: Bentley Publishers, 2000. ISBN 0-8376-0071-5.
- Classic Racing Engines. Sparkford, UK: Haynes Publishing, 2001. ISBN 1-85960-649-0.
- Bruce McLaren: Life and Legacy of Excellence. Sparkford, UK: Haynes Publishing, 2002. ISBN 978-1859608241.
- Emerson Fittipaldi: Heart of a Racer. Sparkford, UK: Haynes Publishing, 2002. ISBN 978-1859608371.
- The V12 Engine. Sparkford, UK: Haynes Publishing, 2005. ISBN 1-84425-004-0.
- Classic Grand Prix Cars: The Front-Engined Era, 1906-1960. Sparkford, UK: Haynes Publishing, 2006. (2nd Ed.) ISBN 1-84425-318-X.
- BRM V16. Veloce Publishing, 2006. ISBN 978-1-84584-037-2.
- Porsche: Excellence Was Expected. Cambridge, MA: Bentley Publishers, 2008. ISBN 0-8376-0235-1.
- Italian Racing Red. Ian Allan Publishing, 2008. ISBN 0711033315.
- Ferdinand Porsche, Genesis of Genius: Road, Racing and Aviation Innovation, 1900 to 1933. Cambridge, Massachusetts: Bentley Publishers, 2009. ISBN 978-0837615578.
- German Racing Silver. Ian Allan Publishing, 2009. ISBN 978-0711033689.
- Colin Chapman: Inside the Innovator. Sparkford, UK: Haynes Publishing, 2010. ISBN 1-84425-413-5.
- Professor Porsche's Wars. Pen & Sword Military, 2014. ISBN 978-1-52672-679-7.
- Reid Railton: Man of Speed. Evro Publishing, 2018. ISBN 1910505250.
- Karl Ludvigsen's Fast Friends: Stars and Heroes in the World of Cars. Delius Klasing Vlg GmbH, 2019. ISBN 978-3667118813.
- Power Unleashed: Trailblazers Who Energised Engines with Supercharging and Turbocharging . Ervo Publishing, 2025. ISBN 1910505374.
