= Aerocoach =

Former bus and coach manufacturer in Chicago, Illinois

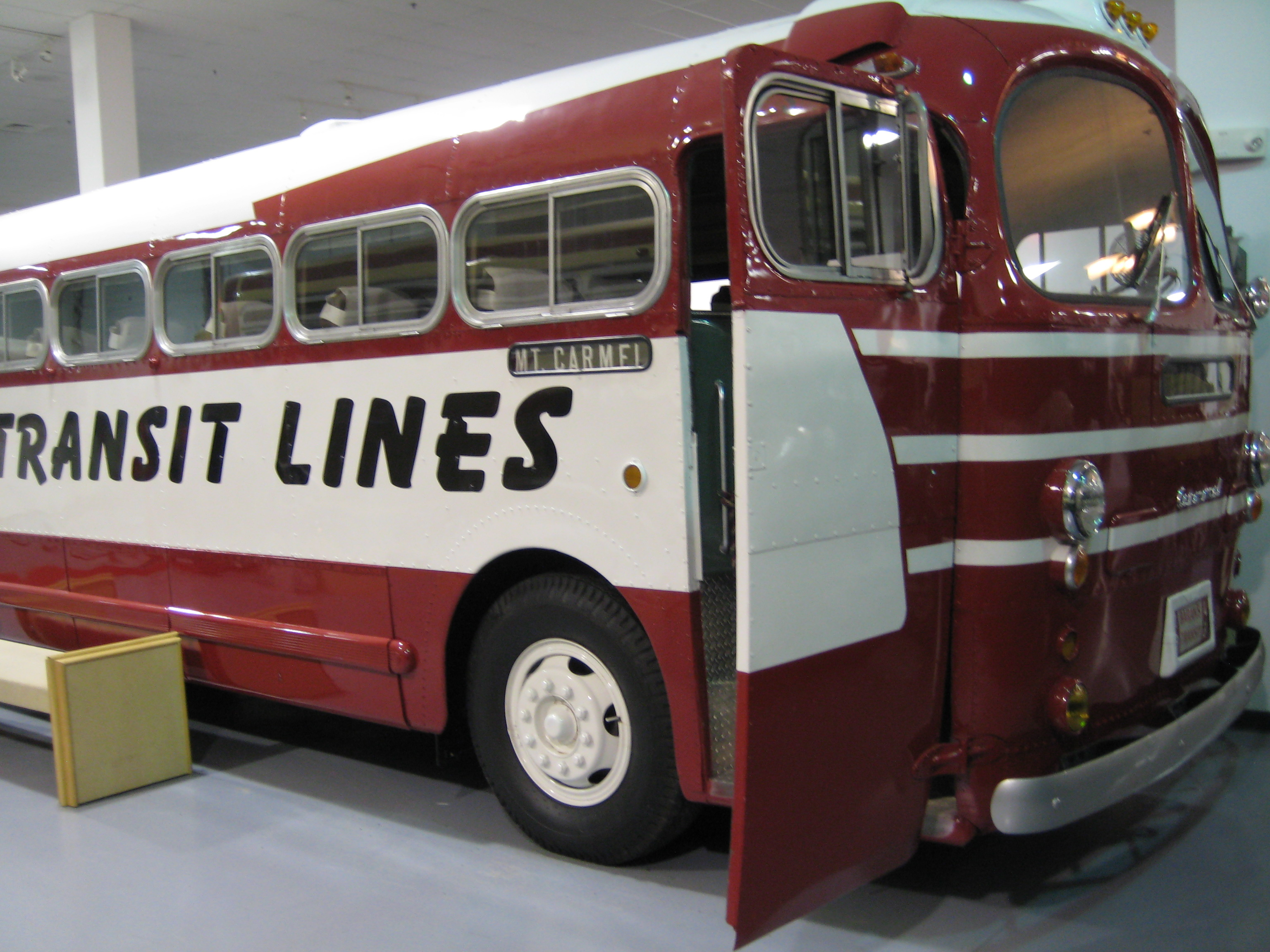
A 1945 Aerocoach P45/37 at the Antique Automobile Club of America in Hershey, Pennsylvania.

Aerocoach (full name General American Aerocoach Corporation) was a bus and coach manufacturer based in Chicago, Illinois, in the United States and was popular in the 1940s. The company existed between 1939 and 1952 when it went out of business. Its first manager was Harry Alphonse Fitzjohn, co-founder of the FitzJohn-Erwin Manufacturing Company.

== Demise and Fate of East Chicago Plant ==
The East Chicago plant was acquired by Steel Car Company, a subsidiary of the General American Transportation Corporation, then by Graver Tank and Manufacturing Company and finally by Union Tank Car Company in 1969 to manufacture railway tank cars until it closed in 2008.

== Products ==
- P45-37
- P46-37
- P46-137
- P-373 - 37 passenger intercity coach
- P-372 - intercity coach

== See also ==
- FitzJohn Coach Company
