= FitzJohn =

American bus manufacturer

- Industry: Bus & coach manufacturer
- Founded: Muskegon, Michigan, U.S. (October 8, 1919)
- Founder: Harry Alphonse FitzJohn
- Defunct: May 1958
- Fate: Dissolved
- Area served: North America
- Products: Duraliner, Cityliner, Falcon
- Subsidiaries: FitzJohn Coach of Canada Ltd.

FitzJohn was an American bus manufacturer in Muskegon, Michigan. The company was founded October 8, 1919, by Harry Alphonse FitzJohn, and built over 5,000 bus bodies, complete buses, stretchout sedans and passenger-carrying trailers before closing down in May 1958.

Corporate names
FitzJohn-Erwin Manufacturing Company	1919–1933
FitzJohn Manufacturing Company	1933–1935
FitzJohn Body Company	1935–1937
FitzJohn Coach Company	1937–1958
FitzJohn Coach of Canada Ltd.	1949–1959

== History ==
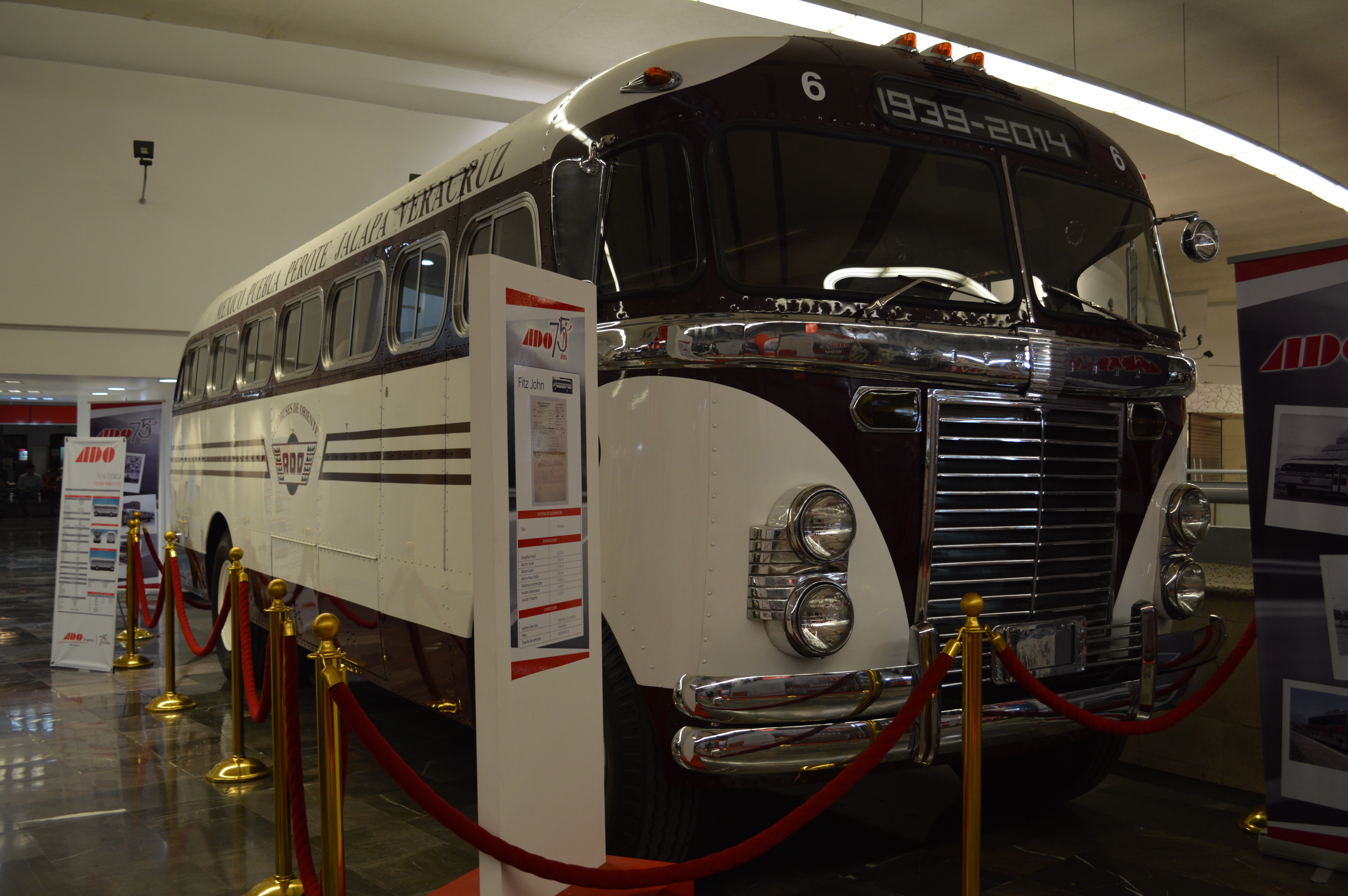
1949 Fitzjohn bus on display at the Terminal de Autobuses de Pasajeros de Oriente bus station in Mexico City

The FitzJohn-Erwin Manufacturing Company was formed on 8 October, 1919 to build truck and bus bodies. The former were mostly for Ford chassis, while the latter were for REOs. Originally sold under the Fitz-Er marque, the buses were soon badged as FitzJohn. FitzJohn's best selling point was the low price relative to its quality, which led to enough success that a new plant was purchased in 1924, five times larger than the original. Sales continued to increase, doubling from 1924 to 1925, and in the late 1920s FitzJohn was delivering almost 300 bodies a year. At that time FitzJohn models had a simple letter designation, although some had rather basic names, too. However, since so many options (such as rooftop luggage racks or polished aluminum bright-work) were offered, many of the variations were also given Indian names by the company's sales & marketing department.

From 1 January 1929, FitzJohn began selling directly to consumers, rather than exclusively through chassis manufacturers and dealers. This change, however, did not prevent a 40% decline in sales due to the Depression, and on 8 June 1931, the company went into receivership. Its founder (H.A. FitzJohn) was forced out, and went into partnership with Paul O. Dittmar to produce the 12- to 15-passenger Dittmar-FitzJohn Autocoach (similar to the model D, but with a lowered aisle along the right side). H.A. FitzJohn later became the first manager of the General American Aerocoach Company.

In 1934, FitzJohn introduced its 11-passenger stretchout model 100. It was based on the Chevrolet Master Sedan which was split in the middle, had an extra body section inserted and a baggage rack added to the roof. The 100 was an immediate success, primarily as an economical "mini-coach" for feeder routes, although some were used for airport transfers or sightseeing services. During World War II, when many other bus manufacturers suspended production in favour of war materiel, the War Production Board directed FitzJohn to build a 15-passenger version of the 100. Otherwise-surplus Chevrolet, Pontiac and Packard sedans had extra rows of back-to-back seats installed, but because of wartime restrictions, white ash framing and Masonite panels were used instead of metal. Sixty-two enclosed auto haulers were also converted to passenger-carrying trailers in 1943.

Starting about 1940, under the direction of James J. St. Croix FitzJohn began to switch from building bodies for other manufacturers' chassis to their own integral models. The last bus body delivered was a model 625 in March 1940 for a White 1012 demonstrator chassis. In 1950, diesel power began to be offered as an option. At the same time the current models were redesigned with rear engines. Even though the Cityliner offered unparalleled maintenance access to the engine (the rear corner panels swung out, as well as the back panels lifted up), FitzJohn could not compete against the larger manufacturers (such as GM and Twin Coach) and decided to leave the transit market in 1954.

FitzJohn's last offering was the Roadrunner. Officially designated the FID (FitzJohn Interurban Diesel with a 150 hp Cummins JBS-600) or FIG (with a Gasoline Waukesha 176 hp 140-GK), the Roadrunner was offered as a 37-passenger coach with a 237-inch (6.0 m) wheelbase, or a shortened 33-seat version on a 201-inch (5.1 m) wheelbase. Only 14 FIGs were built, and all but a handful of the Roadrunners were 37-seaters. The last FitzJohns built for an American customer were five Roadrunner Sightseer variants (with roof windows) for Florida Greyhound Lines. The 85,000-square-foot (7,900 m^{2}) Muskegon factory closed in May 1958, after the last order of 54 FIDs was delivered to Mexico.

Sales records exist for the 31 years 1927 through 1958. During that time FitzJohn constructed 2,621 buses and coaches, 1,460 bodies, 776 stretchouts, and 62 trailer conversions. It is estimated that over 400 bus bodies—plus a small number of truck bodies—were built in the years 1921–1927, for a total of over 5,300 units.

=== Foreign operations ===
In 1949 FitzJohn purchased surplus land and a 42,000 sq ft (3,900 m^{2}) airplane hangar adjacent to the Brantford, Ontario airport. The first buses built by FitzJohn Coach of Canada Ltd. were delivered to Hollinger Bus Lines (a suburban Toronto company) in May 1950. The Brantford plant built 197 buses during its entire existence. Initially the front-engined 310 Cityliner was produced, but construction switched to the rear-engine FTD and FTG. In 1958, the facility was sold to Blue Bird, allowing that company to expand into Canada.

Shortly after World War II FitzJohn established a sales unit in Mexico City. Mexico proved to be a fertile market for the company, and 40-passenger Super Duraliners were sold there until 1956, many built to an unusual rear-entrance/exit configuration. Although sales dropped in the mid-1950s when the Mexican government began to encourage domestic manufacturing, over 50 Roadrunners were exported. Following the dissolution of FitzJohn, a Mexican company began building the Roadrunner.

== Products ==
Model	Seats	Type	Built	Notes
F-60	18	transit	1921–1927	for ¾-ton Reo Speed Wagon chassis; replaced by model F
F-75	18	parlor	1921–?	sedan-style; for ¾-ton Reo Speed Wagon chassis
B-51	21	transit	1922–1928	for ¾-ton Reo Speed Wagon chassis; replaced by model B
—	22	parlor	1924–1927	for Reo W chassis
B	21	transit	1927–1933	Pay-Enter Grand; Seneca without upper sash windows, Sioux with upper sash windows
C	17–25	parlor	1927–1933	Observation Coach (21 seats); Mohawk with 17 seats, Tecumseh with 25 seats
D	12–17	transit/suburban	1927–1933	Utility Coach; Algonquin with 12 seats, Juniata with 14 seats, Apache with 17 seats
F	17	transit	1927–1928	
G	21	parlor	?–1933	Observation Coach; Tomahawk with inside lofts, Shiawassee without inside lofts
H	29	transit	?–1933	Pensacola
K	25	transit/suburban	1928–1933	Navajo
L	19–29	parlor	1928–1933	Commander of the Highways (19 seats); Chippewa with 21 seats, Shawnee with 25 seats, Pocahontas with 29 seats
S	various	school	?–1933	Hiawatha
5	13	parlor	1933–?	streamlined body; only 3 built
10	16	parlor	1933–?	streamlined body; only 7 built (2 as railbuses)
15	?	?	1933–?	no details
20	?	?	1933–?	no details
25	?	?	1933–?	no details
30	?	?	1933–?	no details
35	21–29	transit	1933–1939	198 built (includes 35A, 35B, 35C, 35X and streamlined 35Z versions)
100	11–15	sedan	1934–194x	stretchout Chevrolet Master Sedan; 776 built; 15-seat version built during World War 2
135	?	parlor	1935	2 built
150	?	parlor	1934–?	Deluxe Streamlined Intercity
175	?	parlor	?	no details
215	16–21	transit	1934–?	101 built
250	21–25	parlor	1934–?	Dural Intercity: all-metal flat-front duralumin body; replaced by model 325
300	?	transit	193x–1942	245 built (14 as bodies only); replaced by model 310
310	27–39	transit	1944–1950	Cityliner; forward-entrance flat-front bus; also offered with Hercules JXLD engine; standee windows added in 1947; replaced by models FTD & FTG
325	?	parlor	?–1940	available as body-only or integral coach; replaced by models 500 & 600
350	?	transit	1936–1937	forward-entrance flat-front all-metal body for Reo 3P7 chassis; 25 built
500	24–32	parlor	1939–1945	Duraliner; 243 built; replaced by model 510
510	24–32	parlor	1946–1952	Duraliner; 499 built
525	28	parlor	?	Duraliner; 7 built
600	36	parlor	1939–1940	Falcon; mid-ship underfloor engine
610	36	parlor	1940–1946	Falcon; front engine; replaced by model 635
615	36	parlor	?–1946	Falcon; air-conditioned version of the 610; replaced by model 635
625	?	parlor	1940	last body-only design; for White 1012 chassis
635	36–40	parlor	1949	Super Duraliner; 25 built; export version sold in Mexico until 1956
FTD	?	transit	1950–1954	Cityliner; rear diesel engine (usually Cummins JT-6B)
FTG	?	transit	1950–1954	Cityliner; rear gasoline engine (usually Waukesha 140-GK)
FSD/FSG	?	suburban	?	Suburbanliner; high-back seats and no center door; only 3 built
FID/FIG	33–37	interurban	1954–1958	Roadrunner; Sightseer offered with roof windows; 14 FIG built
—	?	trailer	1943	auto-hauling trailers converted to passenger units; 62 built

== See also ==
- Aerocoach
