= Number matching =

Term used in the collector car industry

Number matching, numbers matching, or matching numbers is a term used in the collector car industry to describe cars with original major components that match one another.

These major components contain dates, casting numbers, model numbers, Vehicle Identification Numbers (VIN), stamped numbers, or codes that match the original components that were on the car when it was new.

== Definition ==
The term "number matching" (or "matching numbers") is used by collectors to describe the authenticity of collectible or investment quality cars. Number matching means that a particular car still has the same major components that it had when it was new. The definition of "major component" is not always agreed on. The appearance of a number matching car likely could not be distinguished from an original car.

== Major components ==
These are parts such as the engine, transmission, rear-axle assembly, and frame of the car, with intake manifolds, exhaust manifolds, body panels, and carburetors sometimes also considered. Many times these components contain dates, casting numbers, model numbers, VIN, stamped numbers, or codes that can match the original components that were on the car when it was new. The definition can often vary from manufacturer to manufacturer, as well as from country to country. Often parts such as transmissions and rear-axles will be common across a range of models and as such do not carry any stamped link to the car it was originally installed in.

It is widely accepted however that the minimum requirement for a vehicle to be Number matching (or matching numbers, depending on local terminology) is for the original Chassis number and/or Vehicle Identification Number (VIN) to match to the engine block, if that is how the original manufacturer identified it, and the data tags. If the manufacturer did not serialize the engine block, all engineering numbers, casting numbers, date codes and any other numbers used by the original manufacturer must match what would have been original to the vehicle.

== Minor components ==
These are parts that are commonly replaced due to regular wear and tear. Parts such as the interior fabric, paint, chrome trim, brakes, instruments, electrical components and wiring are considered minor components and generally do not affect the value of the car.

== Verification ==
The numbers or casting dates on the major components of a car would be present and fall in a particular order. For example, an engine's assembly date would be before the build date of the car, and the casting dates would be before the assembly date of the engine because an engine assembly date (the date the engine was assembled, usually at a different location) could not be after the assembly date of the whole car. Engines are assembled prior to being installed in the car at the factory. Therefore, the assembly date of the car would have to be after the assembly date of the engine. Casting dates (the dates formed in the metal of a component at the foundry) could not be after the assembly date of the engine. And casting dates would be well in advance of the assembly date of the engine. Numbers and dates track an accurate history of how a car was built and when and where the car and the parts used to create the car were made.

If a car has number matching major components it helps define how collectible a car is. Number matching cars typically will have a much greater value than non-number matching cars, because they are much rarer than non-number matching cars, and are seen as a more accurate description of how the car was built.
