= Dilijan =

Dilijan Դիլիջան
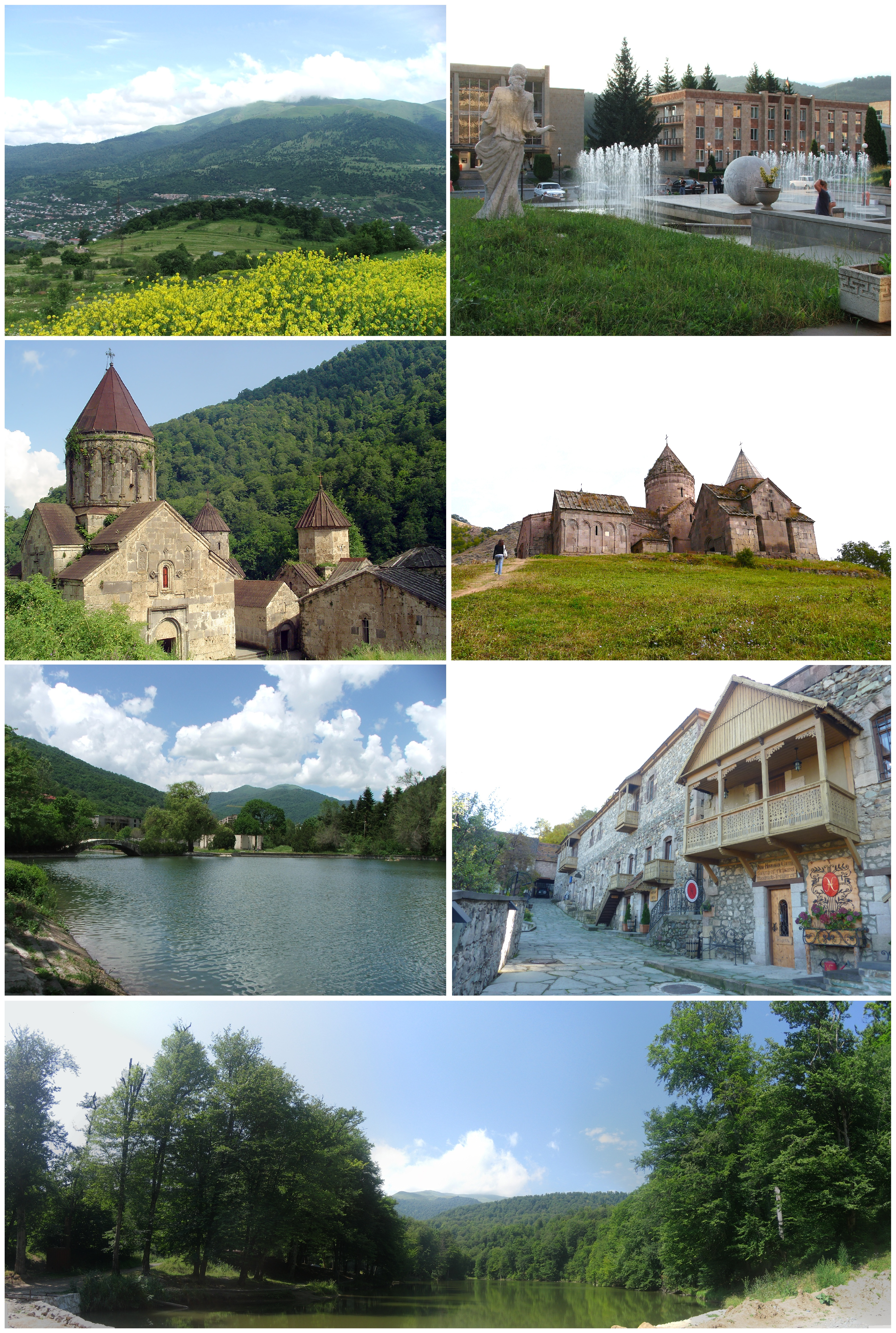

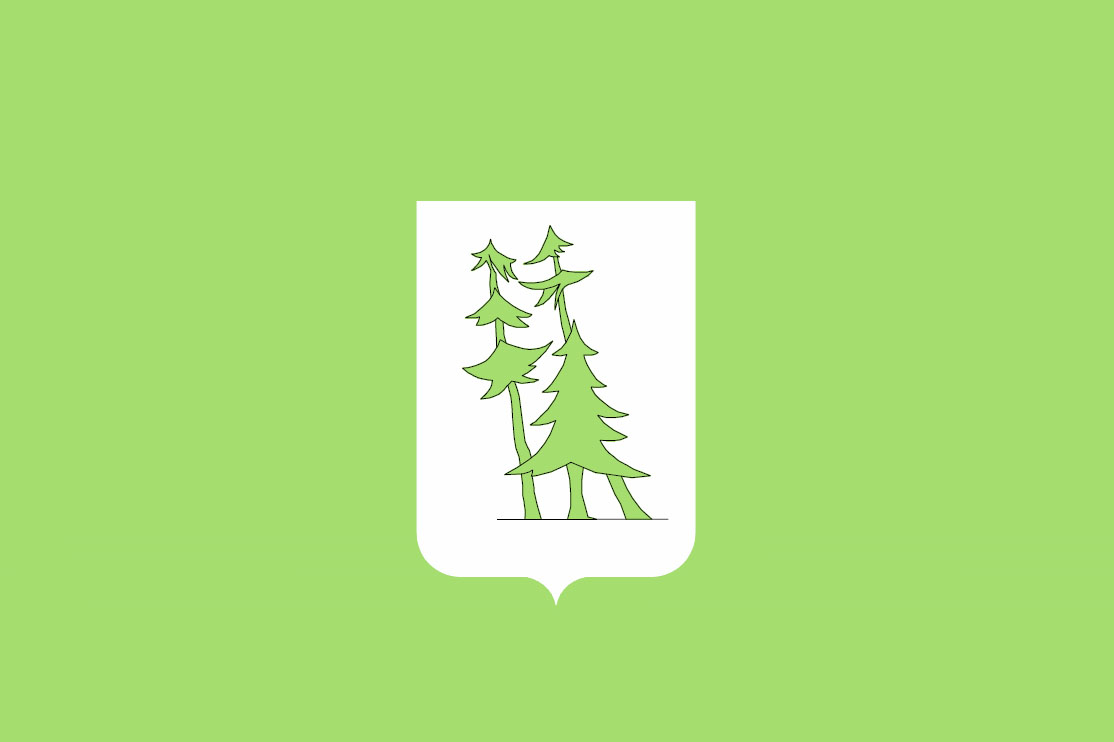
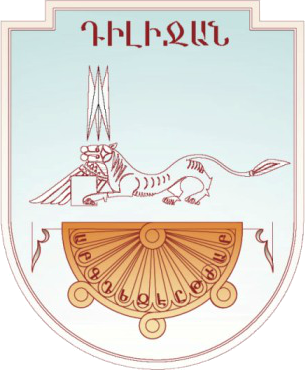
- Flag Seal

- Location within Armenia Location within Tavush
- Coordinates: 40°44′27″N 44°51′47″E
- Country: Armenia
- Province: Tavush
- Municipality: Dilijan

Government
  - Mayor: Armen Santrosyan

Area
  - Total: 13 km^{2} (5.0 sq mi)
- Elevation: 1,500 m (4,900 ft)

Population (2022)
  - Total: 15,914
  - Density: 1,200/km^{2} (3,200/sq mi)
- Time zone: UTC+4 (AMT)
- Website: Official website, dilijancity.am

Dilijan (Armenian: Դիլիջան) is a spa town and urban municipal community in the Dilijan Municipality of the Tavush Province of Armenia. The town is one of the most important resorts in Armenia, situated within the Dilijan National Park. The forested town is home to numerous Armenian artists, composers, and filmmakers and features some traditional Armenian architecture.

Sharambeyan Street in the city centre, has been preserved and maintained as the heart of Dilijan's old town, complete with craftsman's workshops, a gallery and a museum. Hiking, mountain biking, and picnicking are popular recreational activities. As of the 2011 census, Dilijan has a population of 17,712. Dilijan is currently the fastest-growing urban settlement in Armenia. As of the 2022 census, Dilijan has a population of 15,914.

== Etymology ==
In an ancient popular legend, the town is named after a shepherd called Dili. The shepherd Dili was in love with his master's daughter, however her father was against it and ordered to kill the shepherd. For many long and dark days, the sorrowful mother was mourning and looking for her only son all over the area and desperately crying, "Dili jan, Dili jan .. " ("Jan is an Armenian endearment term added to the name of a friend or family member). According to the legend the area was later known for his name.

== History ==
=== Early history and Middle Ages ===
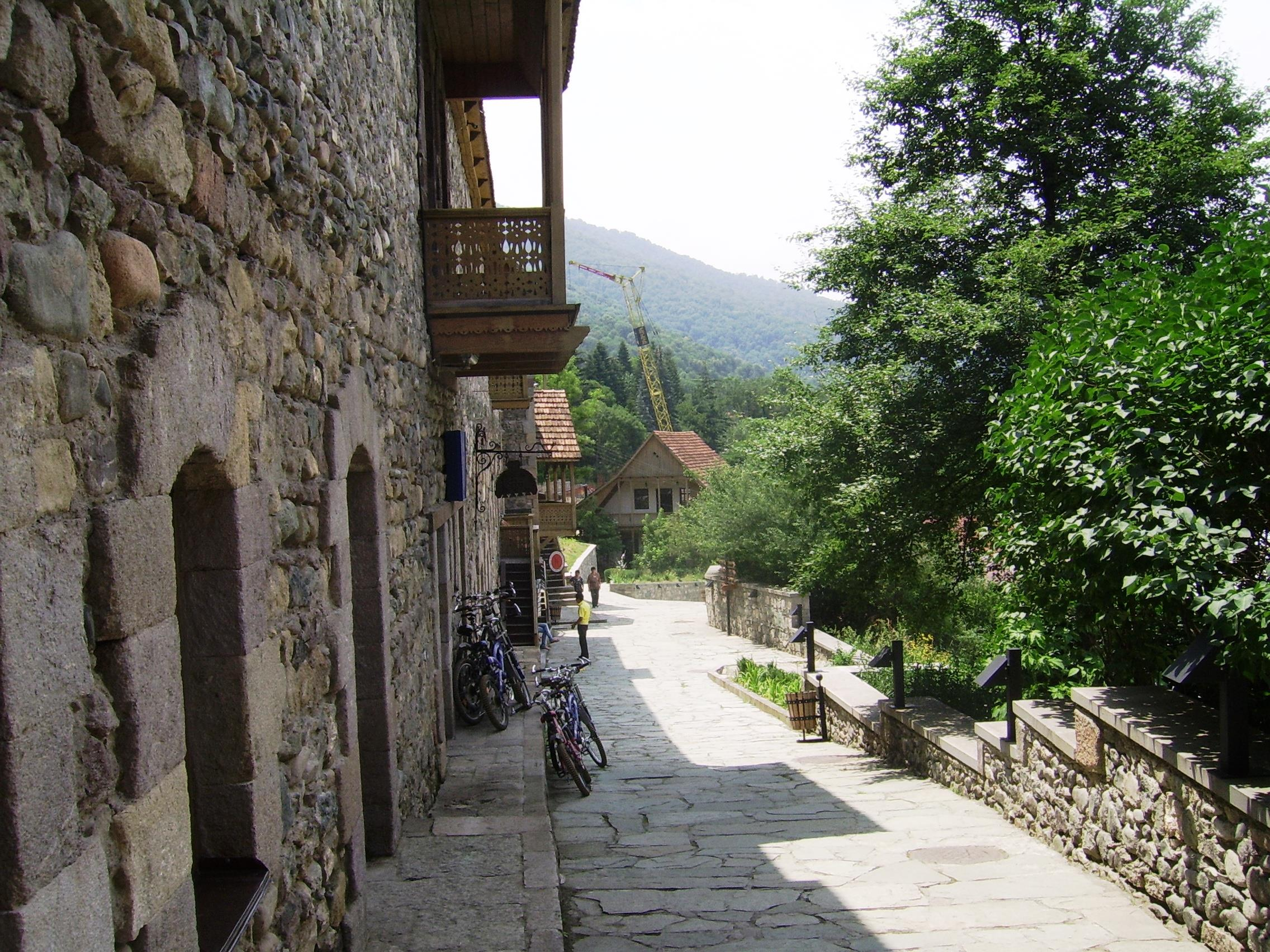
Dilijan's historic Sharambeyan Street, which was recently renovated through the efforts of the Tufenkian Foundation of Cultural Heritage.

Historically, the area of modern-day Dilijan -known as Hovk'- was part of the Varazhnunik canton of Ayrarat; the 15th province of the historic Greater Armenia.

During excavations conducted in the 1870s, many valuable items were found, dating back to the late Bronze and the early Iron ages (between the end of 2000 BC and the beginning of 1000). Some of the excavated collections were transferred to the museums of Moscow, Saint Petersburg, Tbilisi, Baku and Yerevan, while the remainder was kept in the Dilijan Geological Museum.

During the medieval era, the territory of Dilijan was known as Hovk'. Hovk' was a favourite forest and a summering place for the Arsacid kings to display their abilities in hunting. The settlement of Bujur Dili was founded during the 13th century near the area of modern-day Dilijan. The monasteries of Haghartsin and Goshavank were built between the 10th and 13th centuries. The monastery complexes have quickly developed and have served as cultural and educational centers. Haghartsin is one of the iconic examples of the developing Armenian architecture during the Middle Ages. Many other important religious and educational centers of the Middle Ages have survived in Dilijan, such as the Jukhtak Vank Monastery and Matosavank Monastery.

=== Modern History ===
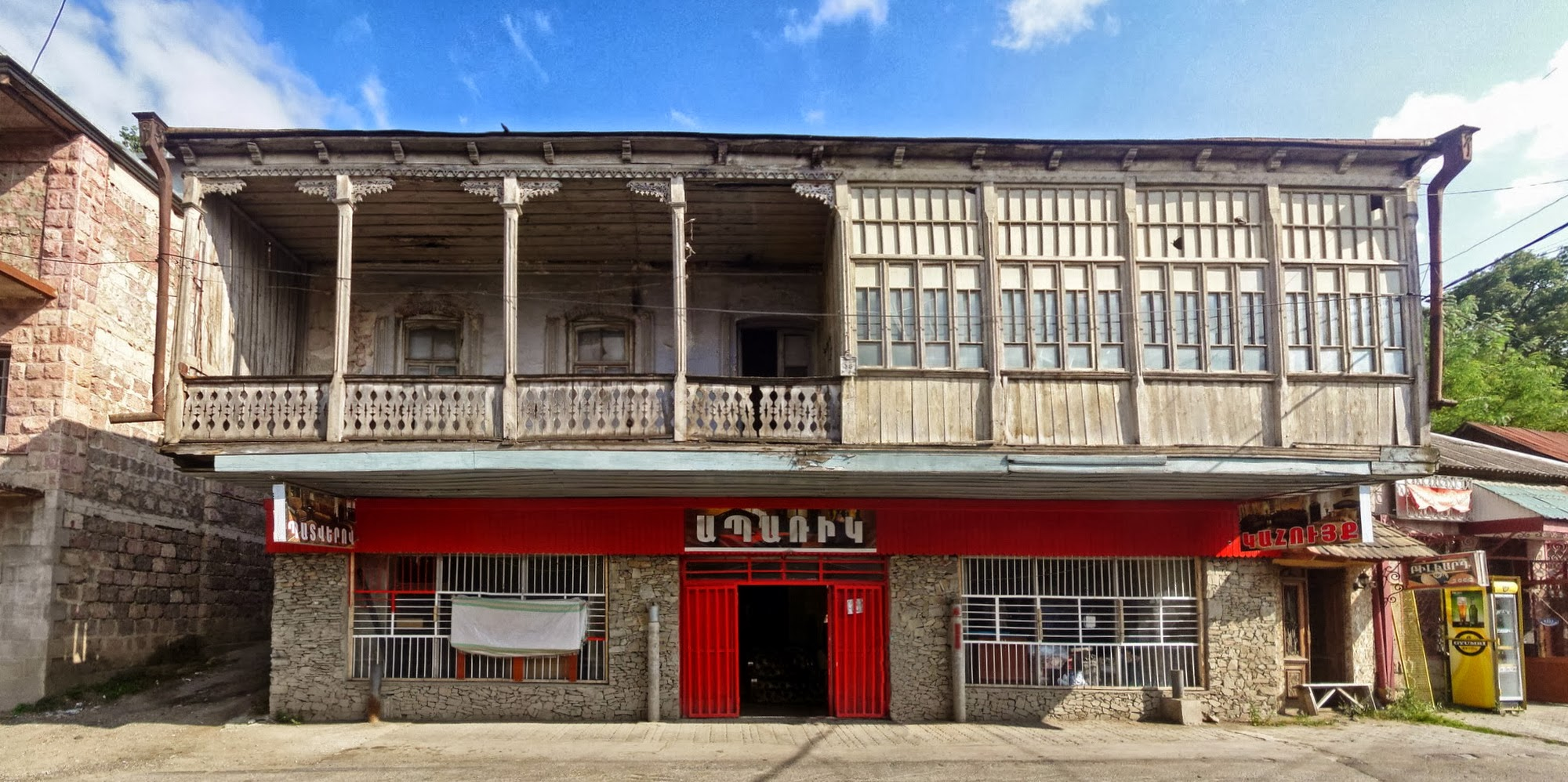
Traditional 19th-century house in Dilijan

In 1501-02, most of the Eastern Armenian territories including the territories of modern-day Tavush, were swiftly conquered by the emerging Safavid dynasty of Iran led by Shah Ismail I. In 1666, the name Dilijan was mentioned for the first time in the notes of the French traveler Jean Chardin.

The territories of present-day Lori and Tavush along with the neighboring Georgia, became part of the Russian Empire in 1800-01. The territories became an official region of Russia as per the Treaty of Gulistan signed between Imperial Russia and Qajar Persia in October 1813, following the Russo-Persian War of 1804–13. Since the town became under the Russian rule in 1801, the population of Dilijan had gradually grown. In 1868 the first public education school was opened in Dilijan.

Auspicious conditions for cultural development have appeared at the end of the 19th and in the beginning of the 20th centuries. Many theatre groups were organized during the 1890s and the first library of the town was opened in 1908.

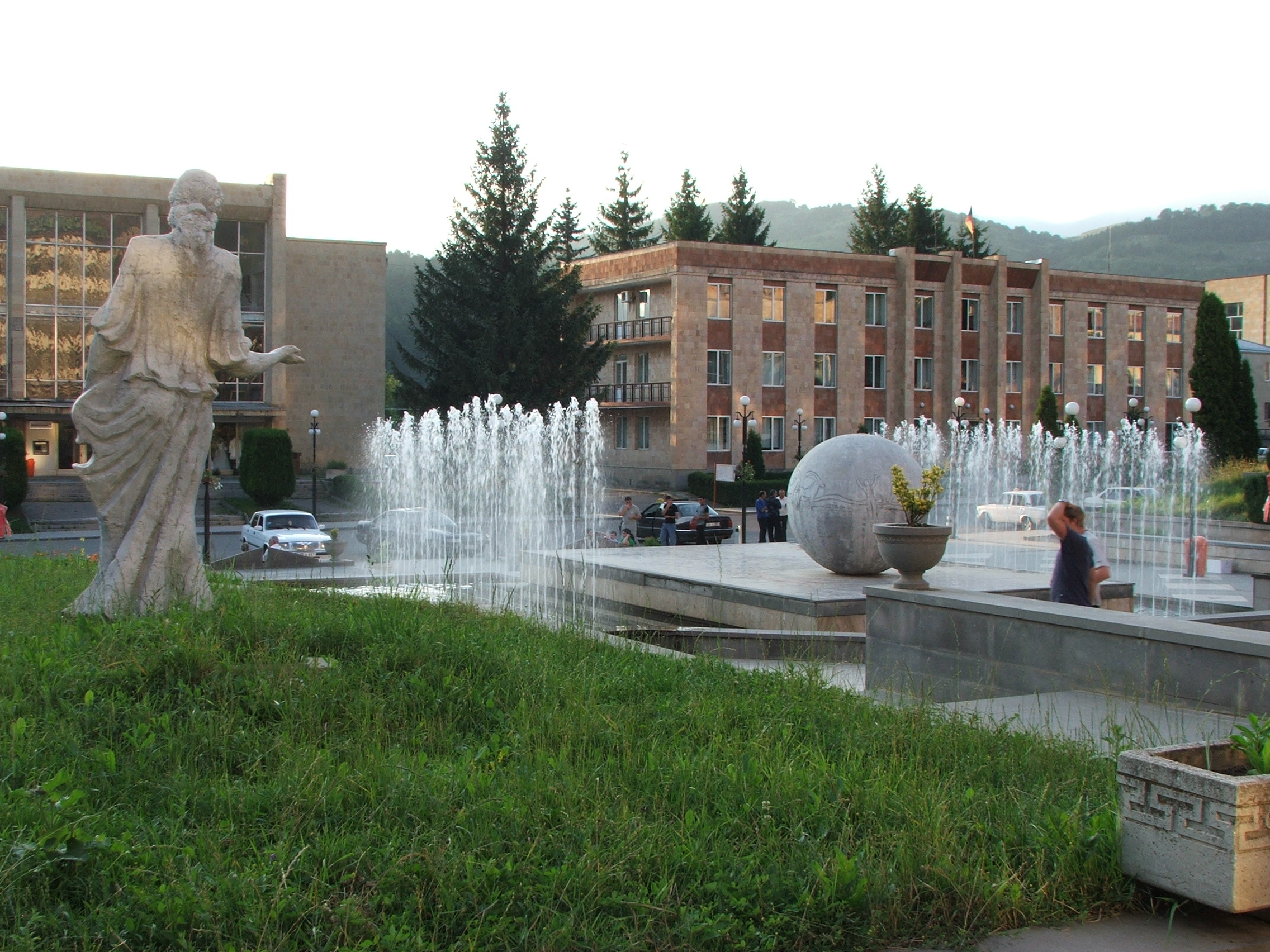
Dilijan's town hall in the city's central square.

In the second half of the 19th century, Dilijan became a well-known mountain resort the town began to grow gradually. By the end of the 19th century, many entertaining centres were opened in the town, and the famous open-air theatre, known as Rotunda, was built in 1900. The theatre became a favorite place for locals and the visiting Russian intellectuals.

At that period, many modern houses were constructed in a unique traditional architectural style. Many wealthy Armenians from Tiflis and other areas of Transcaucasia began to build their own villas in Dilijan. The architecture in Dilijan has been characterized with gable tiled roof, wide patterned oriel and whitewashed walls. The style has quickly been spread all over the villages at the Aghstev river valley.

At the beginning of the 20th century, many traditional crafts have been developed in Dilijan including metalsmith, carpet weaving, fine arts, wood engraving and other types of folk crafts.

During the Battle of Karakilisa in May 1918, Dilijan was the main staging point of the Armenian forces under the command of General Tovmas Nazarbekian. Following the brief independence of Armenia in 1918-20, Dilijan became part of the newly founded Armenian Soviet Socialist Republic. In 1930, it was part of the newly formed Ijevan rayon, until 1958 when Dilijan became a town of republican subordination.

Following the independence of Armenia in 1991, Dilijan became part of the newly formed Tavush Province as per the 1995 administrative reforms. Nowadays, in addition to being one of the most prominent mountain resorts in Armenia, Dilijan is planned to be an international educational centre for both locals and foreigners, through the establishment of many developed schools and educational institutions.

== Geography ==
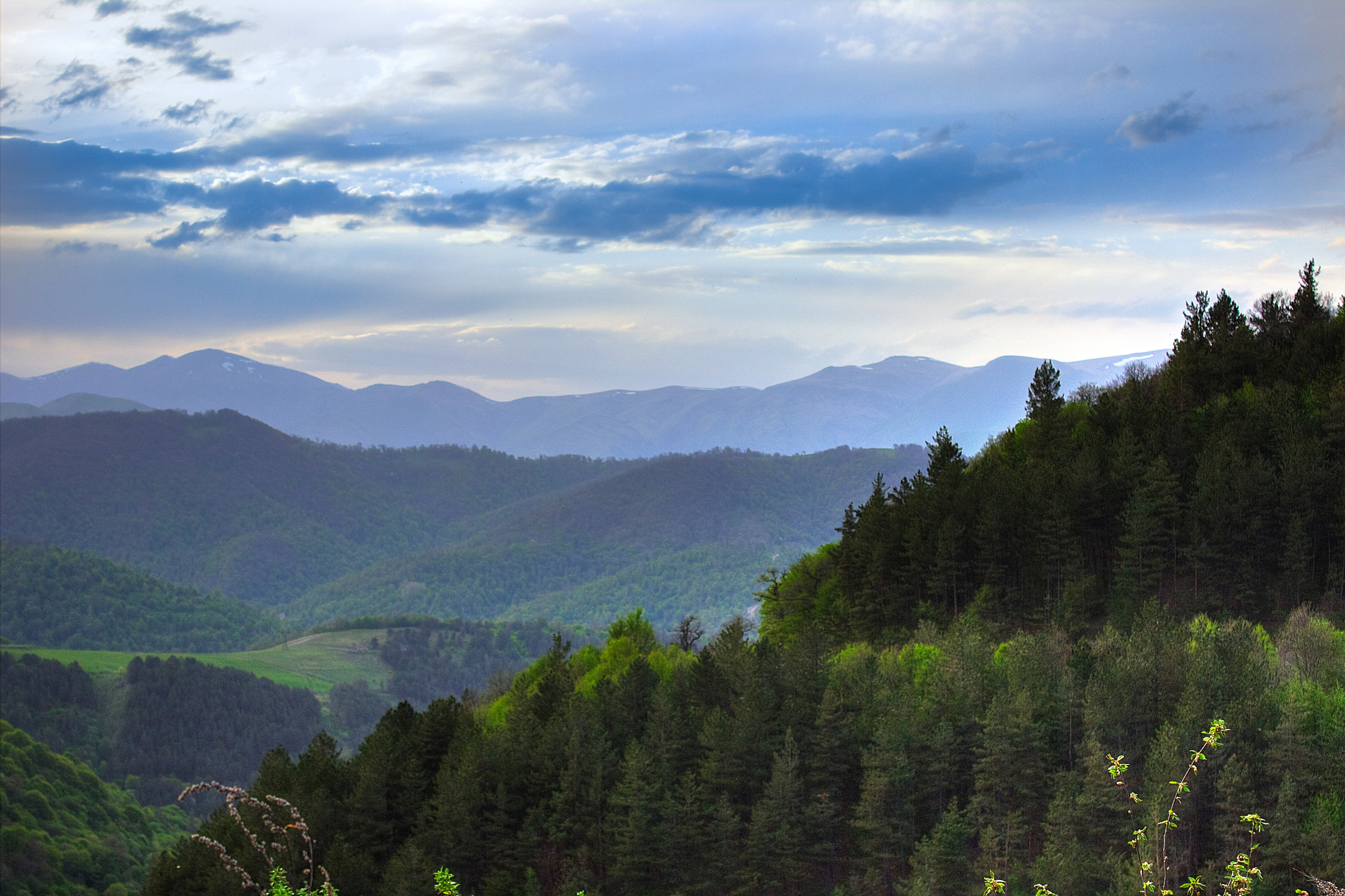
Dilijan National Park

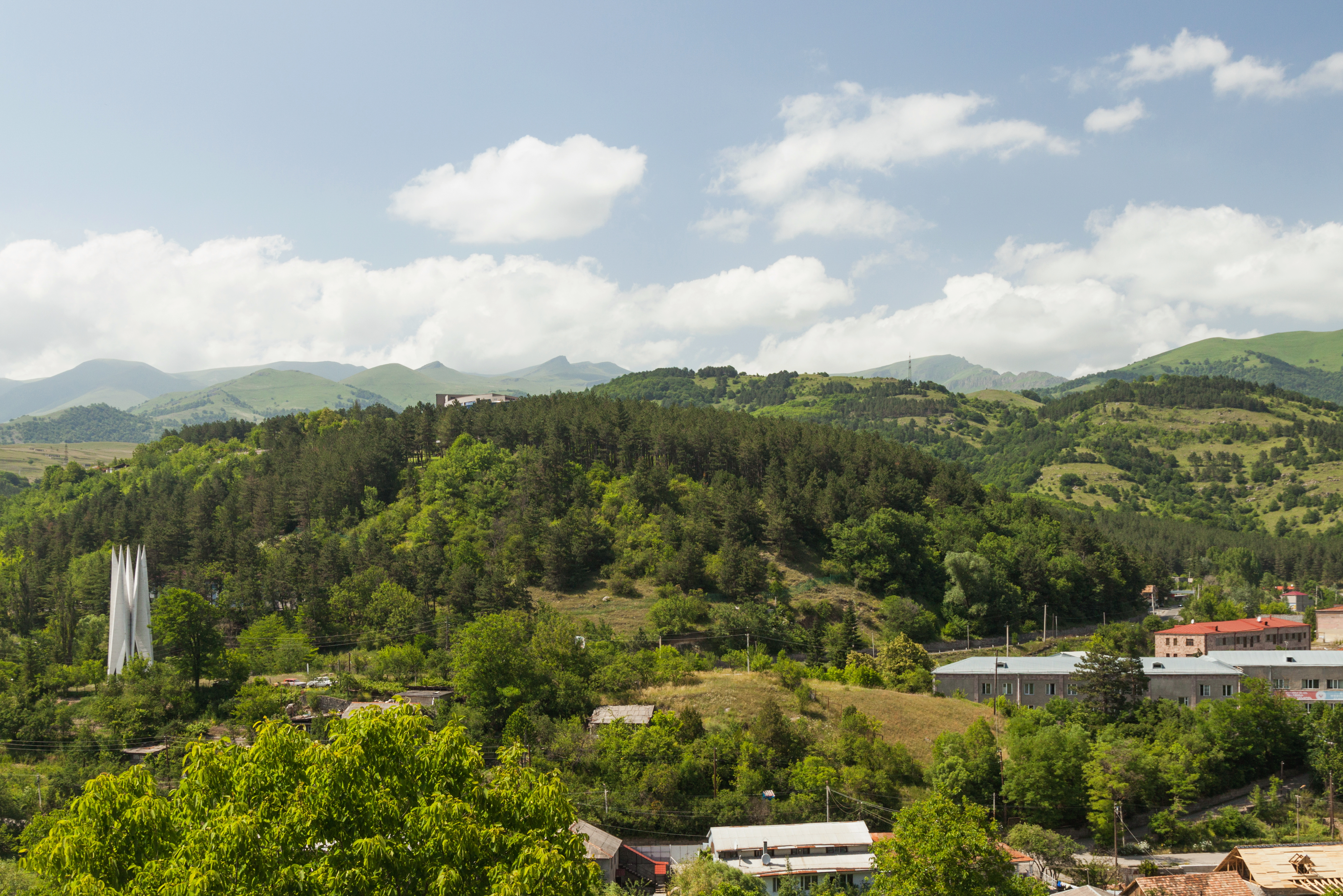
Dilijan's forest.

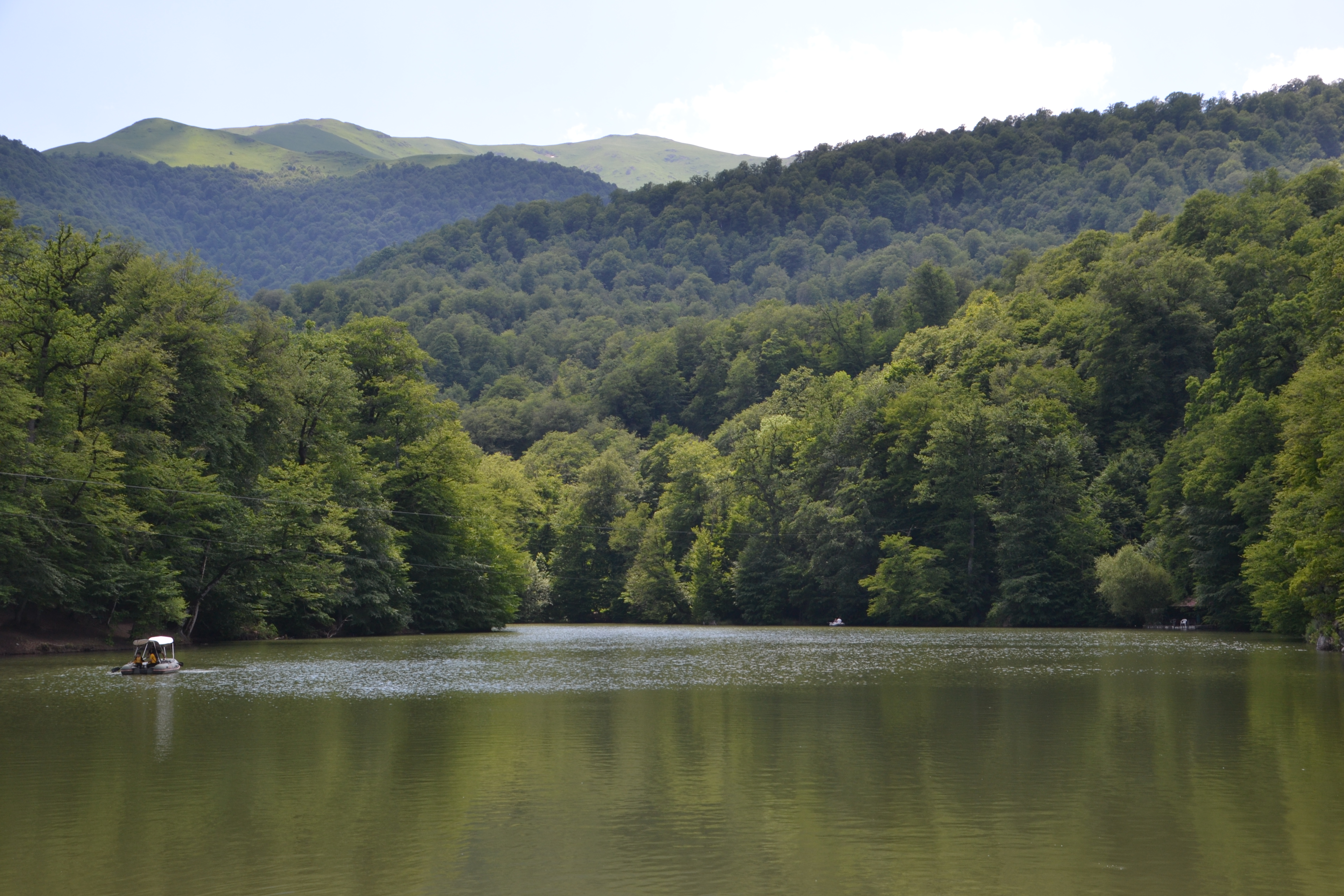
Lake Parz

Dilijan lies on the banks of Aghstev River with a length of more than 20 kilometres (12 miles) and at a height of 1,500 metres (4,921 feet) above sea level. The valley is surrounded with the Lesser Caucasus mountains from the north, and the Semyonovka mountain pass from the south. The mountainous areas -mainly the ranges of Bazum and Pambak mountains- are all covered with thick forests occupying a territory of more than 34,000 hectares (84,016 acres). Reaching up the highest peaks of the mountains, the forests turn into Alpine meadows. In addition to Aghstev River, many other tributaries flow through the town.

=== Dilijan National Park ===
The forests of Dilijan cover an area of more than 34,000 hectares. For the enrichment of the natural life around Dilijan, the state forest reserve was founded in 1958 to become known as Dilijan National Park later in 2002. Woods cover 94% of the park territory and with around 40 types of trees and 18 types of bushes, being mostly oaks, beeches, hornbeams, maples, elms, willows, etc.

The national park is also rich in its fauna, including brown bear, wolf, marten, otter, lynx, sylvan cat, Persian squirrel, sylvan dormouse, hedgehog, chamois, European red deer, wild hog, pheasant, quail, partridge, Caspian turkey, culver, white-tailed eagle, lammergeyer, pygmy eagles, golden eagle, hawk and others.

Lake Parz is one of Dilijan's most attractive natural landmarks. It is situated in the northern part of the town at a height of 1,400 metres (4,593 feet) above sea level. It has an area of 2 hectares (5 acres) and an average depth of 8 metres (26 feet).

To the east of the Lake Parz, at a distance of 3 kilometres (2 miles) from Gosh village, Lake Tzlka is located at a height of 1,500 metres (4,921 feet). Aghstev River with its tributaries passes through the town and the surrounding forest. Its origins are from the northwestern part of the Pambak mountain range, at a height of 2,980 metres (9,777 feet). Aghstev River has a length of 133 kilometres (83 miles). Many tributaries flow into Aghstev such as Bldsan, Ghshtoghan, Haghartsin and Getik rivers.

=== Climate ===
The climate in Dilijan is classified as warm summer humid continental climate (Köppen Dfb) with cool weather during the summer and cold with snowfalls in winter. With its montane climate, Dilijan is a town-resort with favorable oxygen regimen, unique landscape features and curative mineral water.

Climate data for Dilijan (1991-2020)
Month	Jan	Feb	Mar	Apr	May	Jun	Jul	Aug	Sep	Oct	Nov	Dec	Year
Record high °C (°F)	17.1 (62.8)	19.1 (66.4)	25.3 (77.5)	30.0 (86.0)	31.2 (88.2)	34.0 (93.2)	35.5 (95.9)	37.3 (99.1)	33.0 (91.4)	31.4 (88.5)	23.9 (75.0)	21.8 (71.2)	37.3 (99.1)
Mean daily maximum °C (°F)	4.2 (39.6)	5.0 (41.0)	8.2 (46.8)	14.5 (58.1)	18.9 (66.0)	21.6 (70.9)	24.4 (75.9)	24.3 (75.7)	20.8 (69.4)	16.4 (61.5)	10.7 (51.3)	6.3 (43.3)	14.6 (58.3)
Mean daily minimum °C (°F)	−6.2 (20.8)	−5.5 (22.1)	−2.9 (26.8)	2.3 (36.1)	6.5 (43.7)	9.3 (48.7)	12.7 (54.9)	12.3 (54.1)	9.0 (48.2)	3.9 (39.0)	0.0 (32.0)	−3.9 (25.0)	3.1 (37.6)
Record low °C (°F)	−20.2 (−4.4)	−21.6 (−6.9)	−14.7 (5.5)	−11.8 (10.8)	−1.5 (29.3)	1.3 (34.3)	4.6 (40.3)	4.0 (39.2)	−0.8 (30.6)	−4.7 (23.5)	−14.2 (6.4)	−18.5 (−1.3)	−21.6 (−6.9)
Average precipitation mm (inches)	21.4 (0.84)	28.0 (1.10)	48.5 (1.91)	74.3 (2.93)	102.4 (4.03)	95.3 (3.75)	75.1 (2.96)	51.8 (2.04)	45.6 (1.80)	48.6 (1.91)	33.2 (1.31)	22.5 (0.89)	646.7 (25.47)
Average precipitation days (≥ 1.0 mm)	4.6	5.1	7.8	11.5	15.8	12.6	8.5	7.4	6.6	7.9	5.4	4.2	97.4
Average relative humidity (%)	68	66.8	68	73.2	77.8	77.5	76.2	74.6	77.9	79.1	73.4	68.2	73.4
Mean monthly sunshine hours	118.3	128.7	141.8	135.9	163.8	206.4	198.7	194.3	185.2	141.6	125.9	115.9	1,856.5
Source: World Meteorological Organization(Temperature Normals),NOAA

== Demographics ==
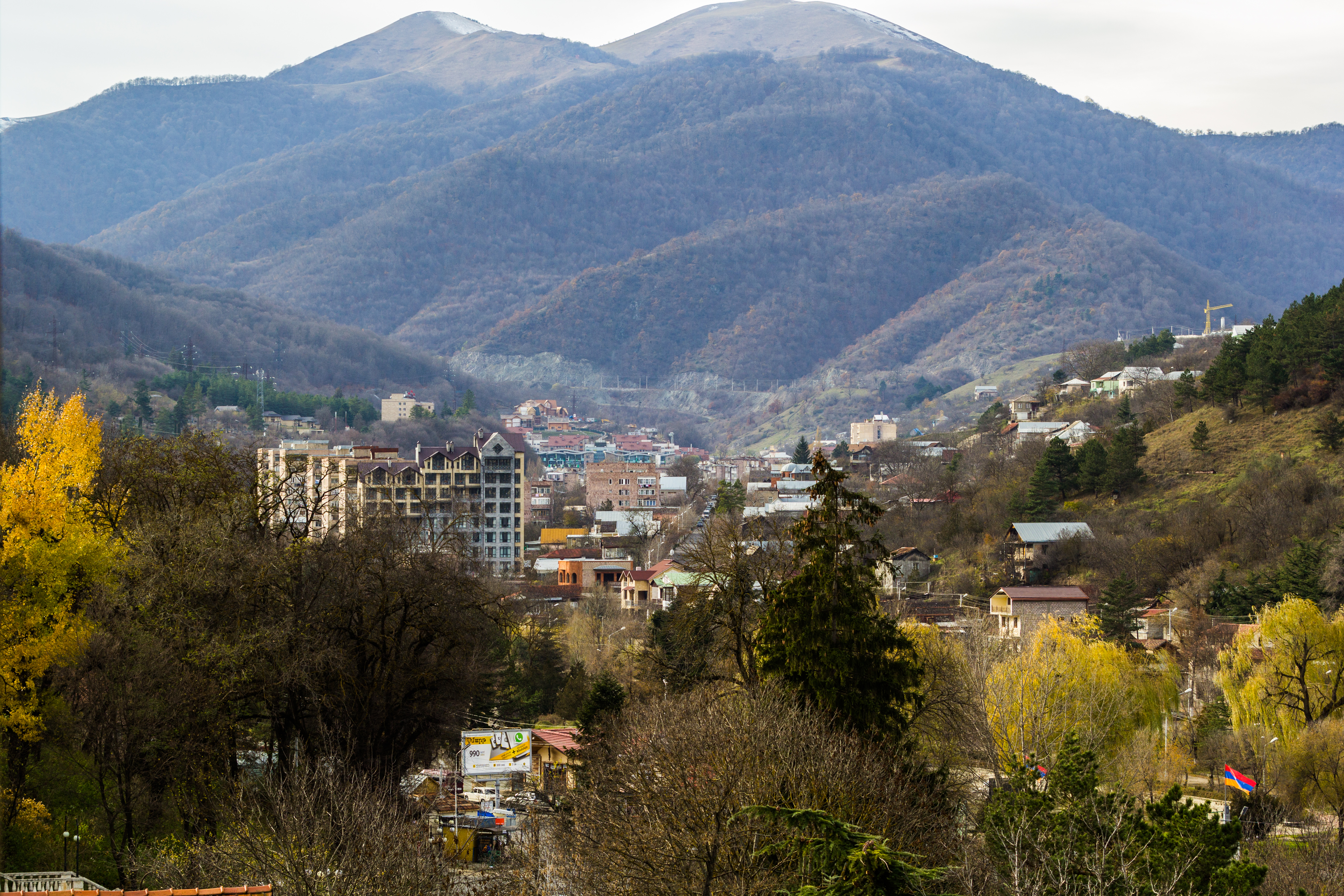
Downtown Dilijan in autumn 2015

The majority of the population in Dilijan are ethnic Armenians who belong to the Armenian Apostolic Church, under the jurisdiction of the Diocese of Tavush based in Ijevan. There is also a small community of Russians who are spiritual Christians known as Molokans.

As of the 2011 census, Dilijan has a population of 17,712, down from 23,700 reported in the 1989 census. Currently, the town has an approximate population of 16,600 as per the 2016 official estimate. As of the 2022 census, Dilijan has a population of 15,914.

Historical population
Year	Pop.	±% p.a.
1976	24,056	—
1989	30,433	+1.83%
2001	16,201	−5.12%
2011	17,712	+0.90%
2022	15,914	−0.97%

Dilijan does not a have a church building, and the church services are conducted at a building within the Tufenkian Old Dilijan complex. The town's monumental church is currently under construction since April 2016.

== Culture ==
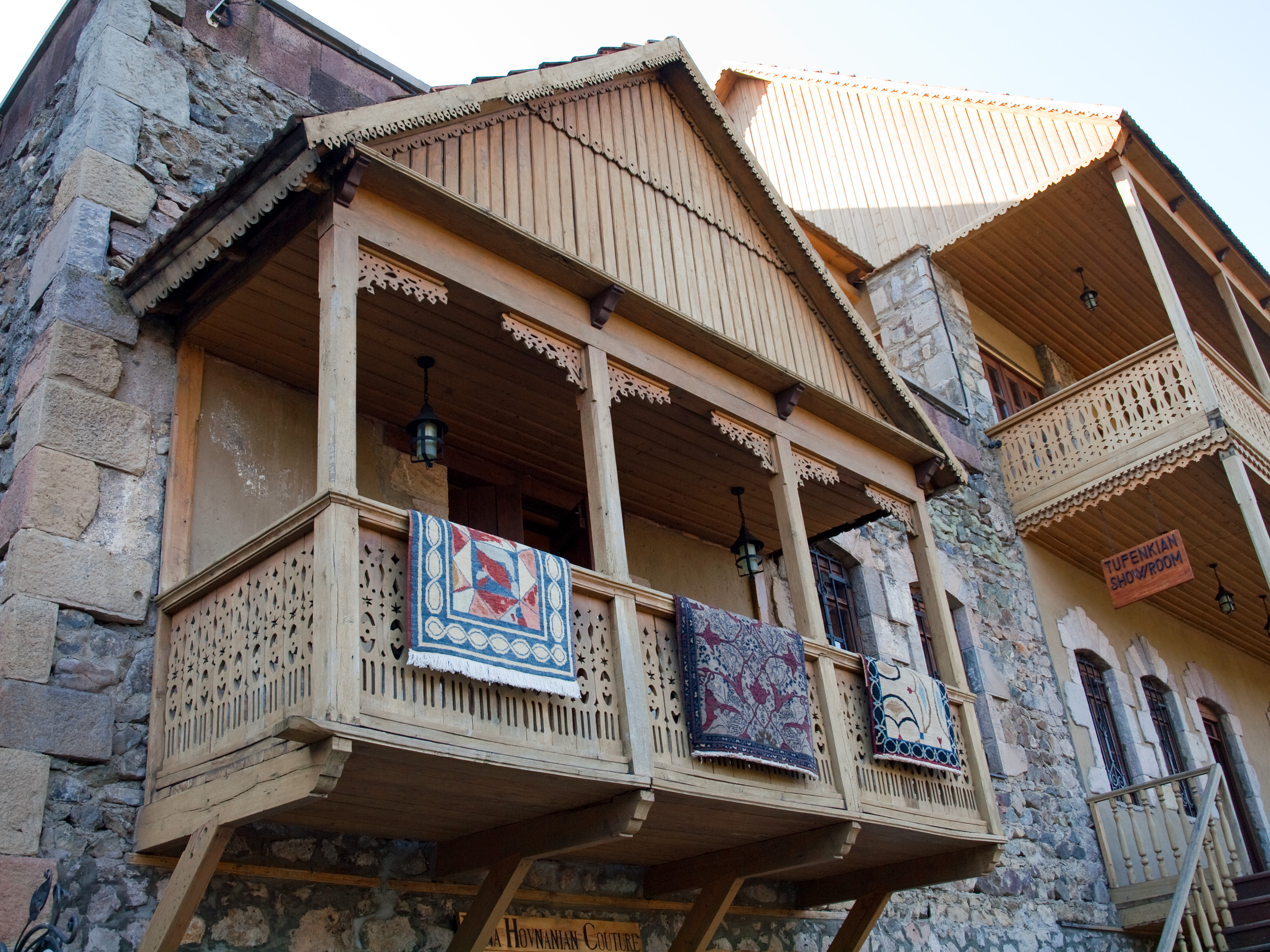
Architectural findings from Dilijan.

Dilijan has a rich historical and cultural heritage. During the nearby excavations in the prehistoric cemeteries of Golovino and Papanino, bronze items of almost three thousand years old were found, including armours, daggers, pitchers, ear-rings and others were found. All those items could be found either in the Dilijan museum or in the Hermitage Museum.

In 1932 the State Theatre was founded in Dilijan under the supervision of the honored USSR artist Hovhannes Sharambeyan, while the school of music was founded in 1946.

On 26 January 2013, the American University of Armenia and the Central Bank of Armenia inaugurated a new state-of-the-art library at the Knowledge for Development Center in Dilijan. On the same day, the Dilijan branch of Tumo Center for Creative Technologies was also opened in the development center.

=== Monuments ===
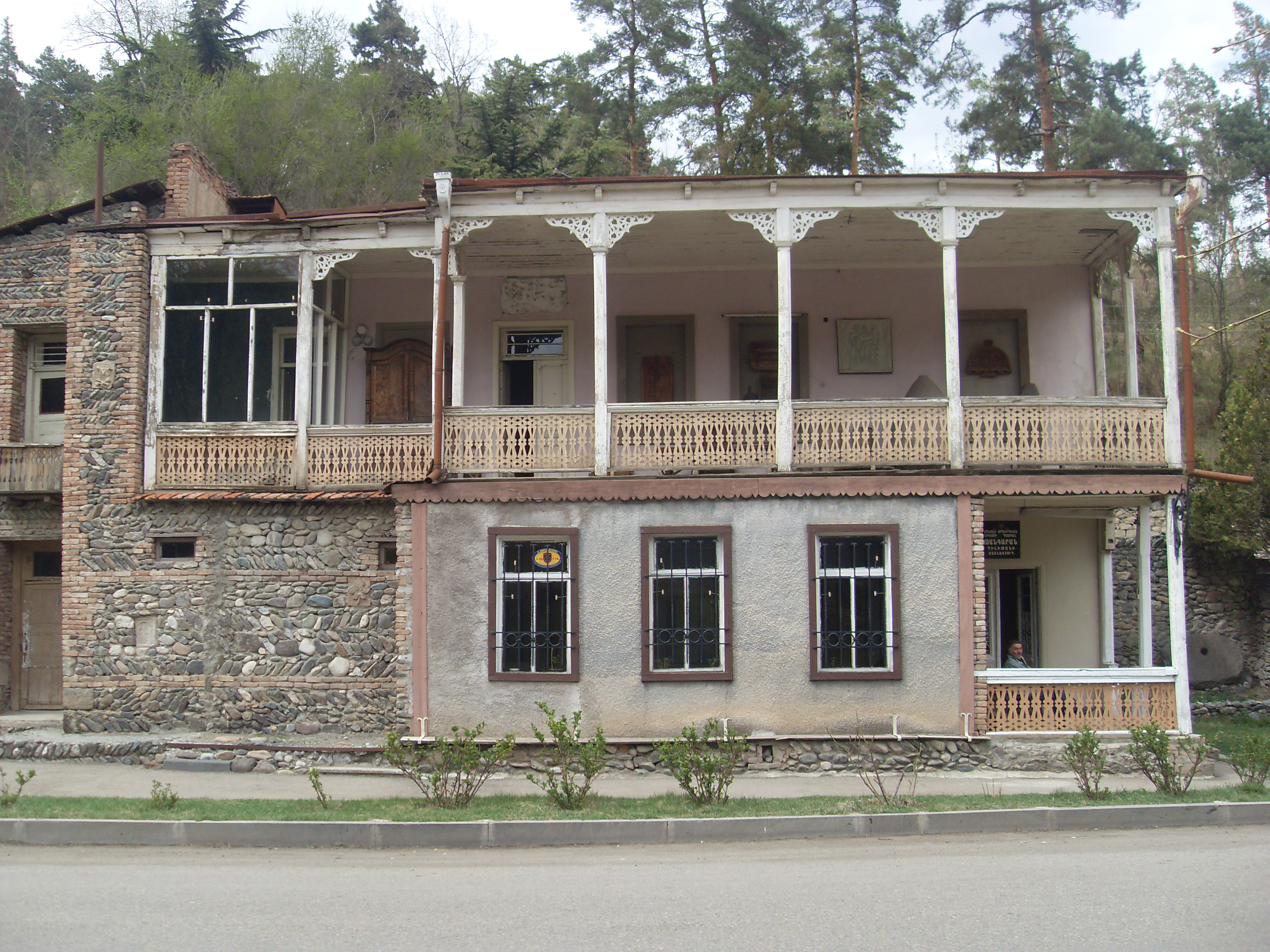
The Dilijan Museum of Popular Art.

- Dilijan Museum of Popular Art: formerly a residential house dating back to the second half of the 19th century, converted into a traditional art museum in 1979.
- The open-air theatre, also known as the Rotunda: built in 1900, it is located at the centre of the town. Many prominent artist performed in the theatre including H. Abelian, Vahram Papazian, A. Hrachian and others.
- Dilijan Museum of Geology: opened in 1952, it is located at the centre of the town.
- Memorial to Soviet Armenia: built in 1970 by the artists A. Tarkhanyan, S. Avetisyan, K. Vatinyan, symbolizing the 50th anniversary of the Sovietization of Armenia. Five edges of the monument symbolize each decade of the 50 years.
- Memorial to World War II: built near central park in 1975 by K. Vatinyan and S. Mehrabyan to commemorate the local martyrs during World War II.

=== Nearby attractions ===
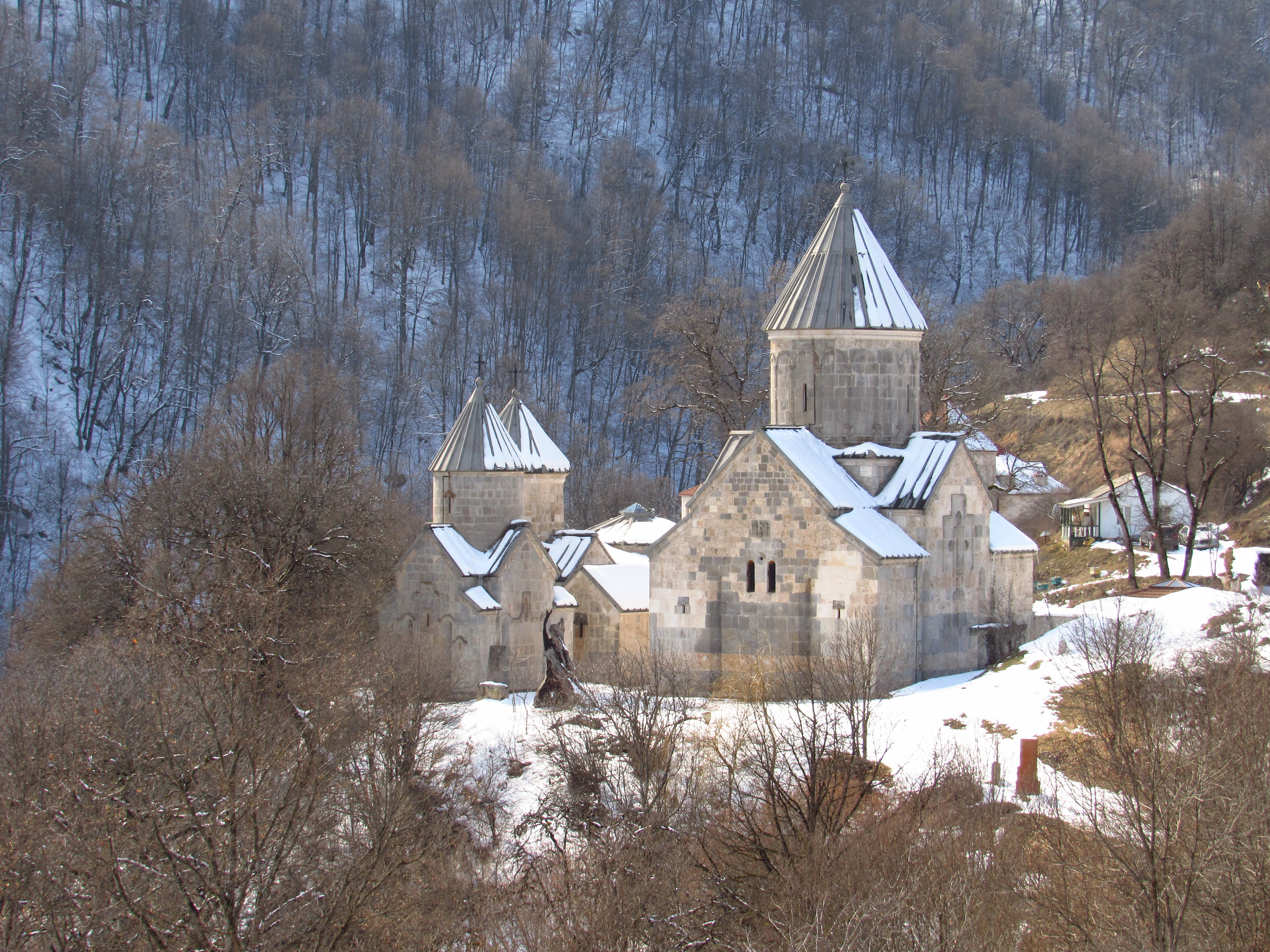
Haghartsin Monastery

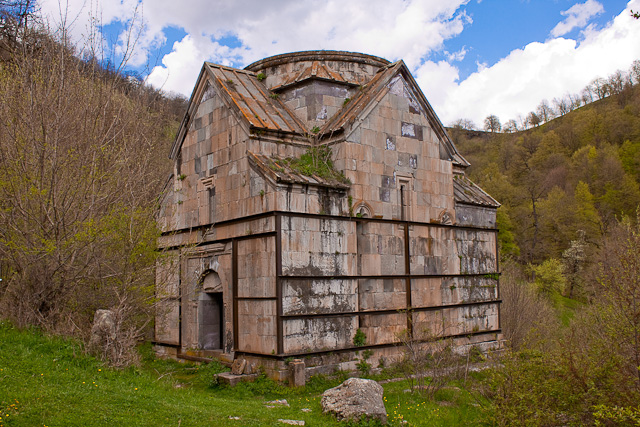
The remains of Jukhtak Vank Monastery

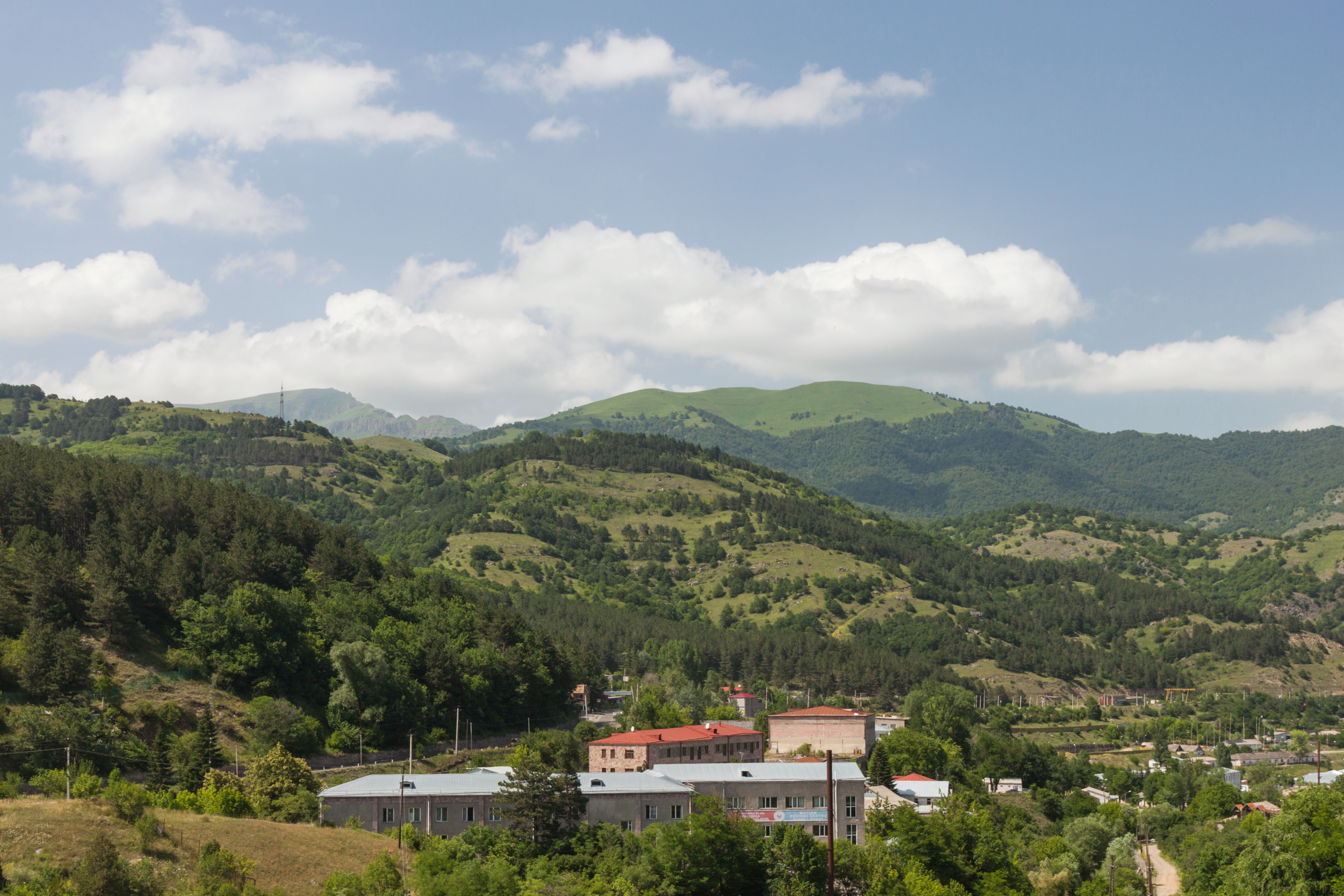
Lesser Caucasus mountains

- Haghartsin Monastery: one of Armenia's most popular monasteries, Haghartsin is nestled in lush forested mountains about a half-hour drive from Dilijan. The monastery is in good condition and has a resident priest who sometimes gives tours. There are a few different churches, a large gavit, a huge dining hall, khachkars and a massive hollow tree. A slightly sweet bread is often being baked in an old oven.
- Goshavank Monastery: located to the north of the town, surrounded with a traditional village, and has a groundskeeper who opens the main church building up for visitors, and can give a tour. This is the one church in all of Armenia where entrance to one of the chambers is not free. The chamber is nice, but you can certainly enjoy the rest of the complex without it, especially since it may not be offered in English. There are carved details and khachkars here, but the "lacework" khachkar at Goshavank is one of the most impressive in the world.
- Jukhtak Vank Monastery: small 12th century monastery located just at the edge of Dilijan, only at a 10-minute hike from the Dilijan Mineral Water plant. Huge iron bands hold one of the two churches together, preventing its collapse. The site has two separate churches, Surp Astvatsatsin and Surp Grigor with their surrounding cemeteries.
- Matosavank Monastery: located in the forest opposite to Jukhtak Monastery. It is easy to miss, and not terribly interesting from the outside, but the inside is a cool, moist, green, mossy world unto itself. The low light illuminating bright green algae covered khachkars is very soothing, and the environment transports you far from your daily life.
- Dilijan National Park: or the Dilijan Reserve, occupying 24,000 hectares, is well known for its forest landscapes, rich biodiversity, medicinal mineral water springs, natural and cultural monuments.
- Other historic monasteries: Saint Gregory of the 10th century, Saint Stepanos and Saint Astvatsatsin of to the 13th century with a number of khachkars in the complex.

== Transportation ==
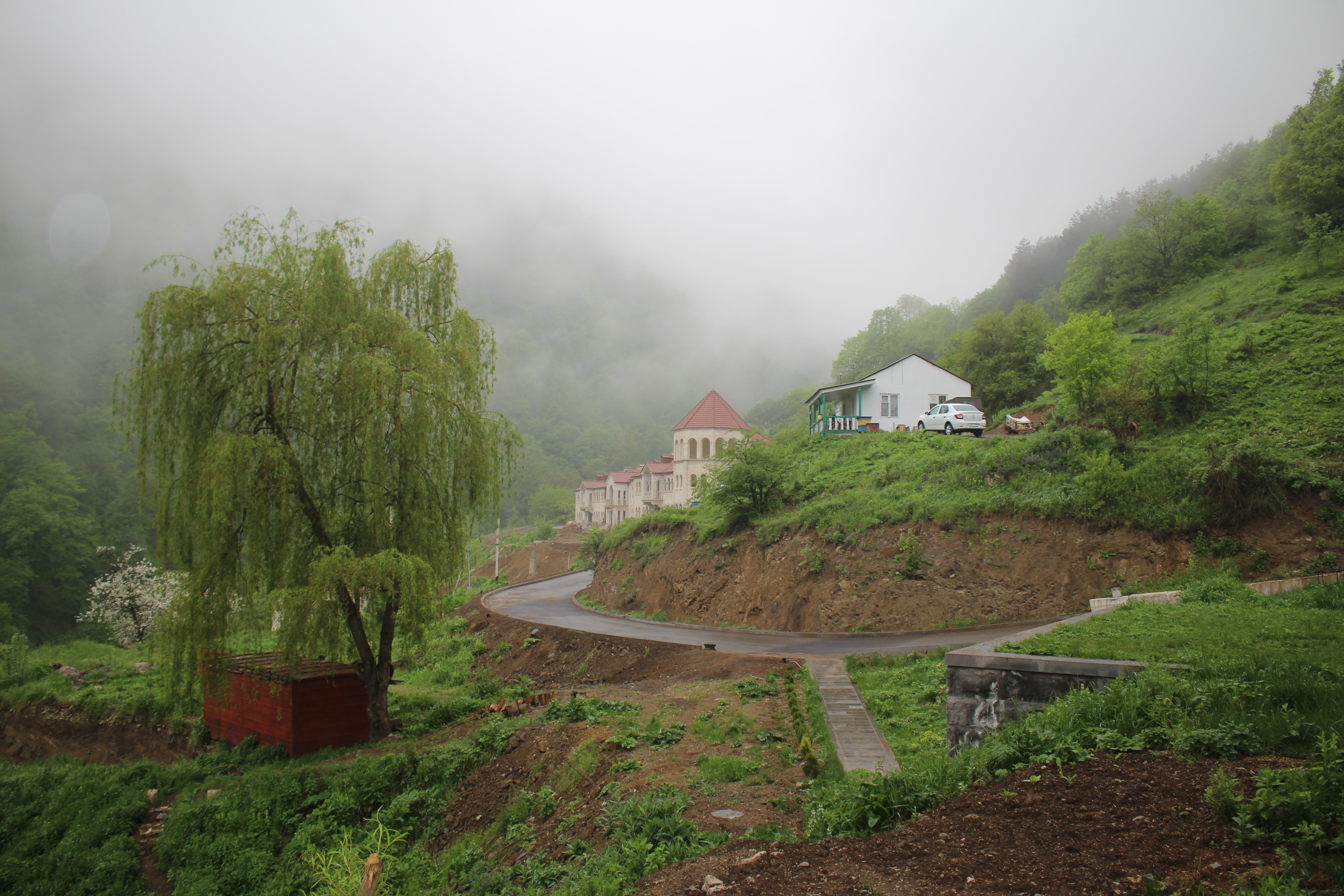
On the road to Dilijan

Dilijan is connected with Yerevan and central Armenia through the M-4 Motorway. The town is an important connecting point between the capital Yerevan and northeastern Armenia reaching up the border with Azerbaijan.

The 2.25 km-long Dilijan tunnel is part of the M-4 Motorway.

In the late 1980s the town had a railway station, although since 2012 even South Caucasus Railway freight trains from Hrazdan no longer run given the line beyond to Ijevan is out of use.

== Economy ==
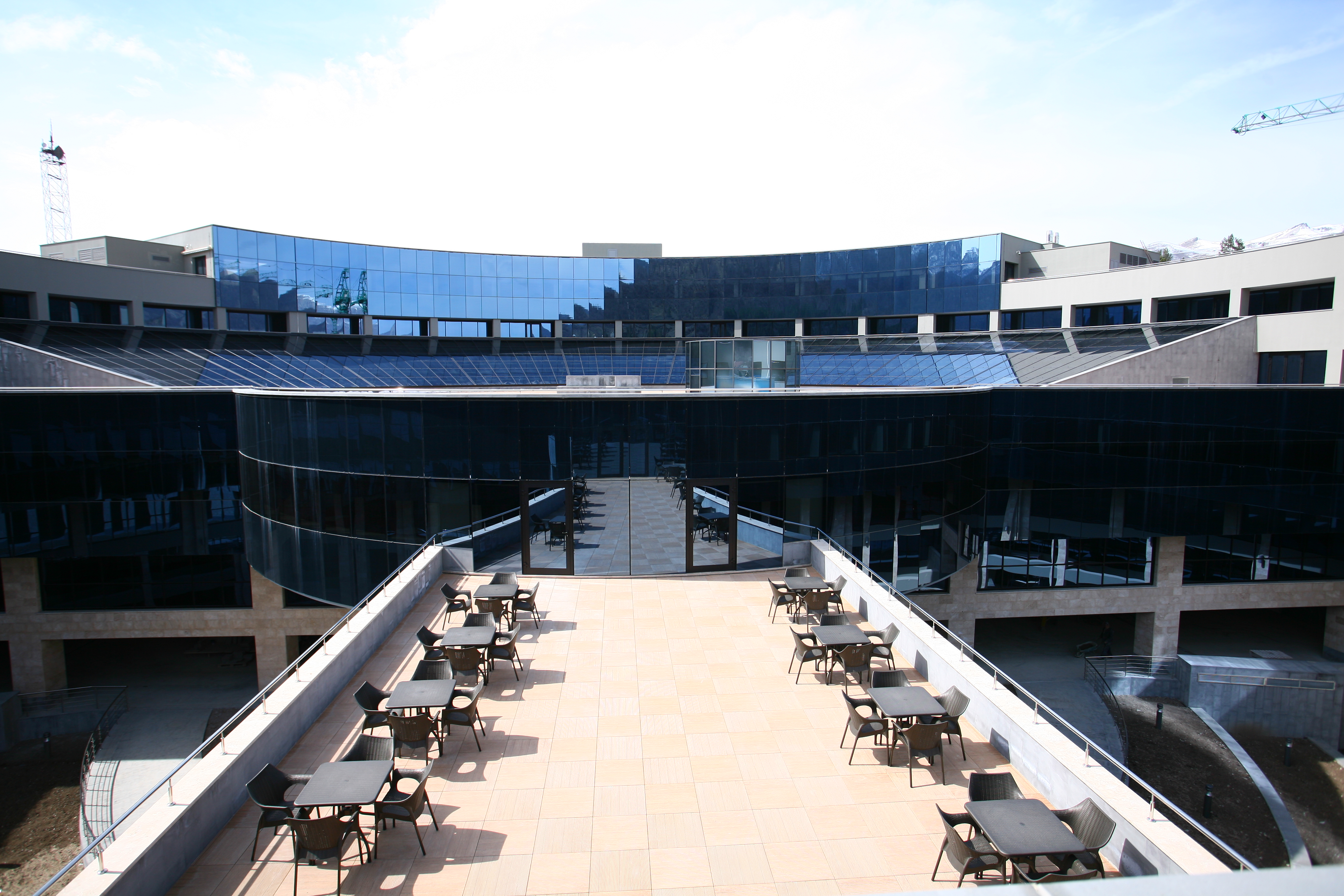
Central Bank of Armenia's Educational Center in Dilijan

=== Industry ===
Dilijan is famous for its mineral water, being processed and bottled by the "Dilijan Mineral Water Plant" founded in 1947. The town is also home to the "Aramara" company for fine woodworking founded in 1993, and the "Dili" factory for dairy products founded in 2005.

Dilijan is also famous for its hand-made rugs and carpets. The town has its own style of carpet design, with many samples shown at the Dilijan museum of traditional art. The famous Impuls factory of Dilijan for communication systems was opened in 1962 by the Soviets. However it was abandoned in the 1990s, following the dissolution of the Soviet Union.

The Armenian government has announced plans to turn Dilijan into a regional financial capital, beginning with the move of much of the Central Bank's operations to Dilijan in 2013.

=== Tourism ===
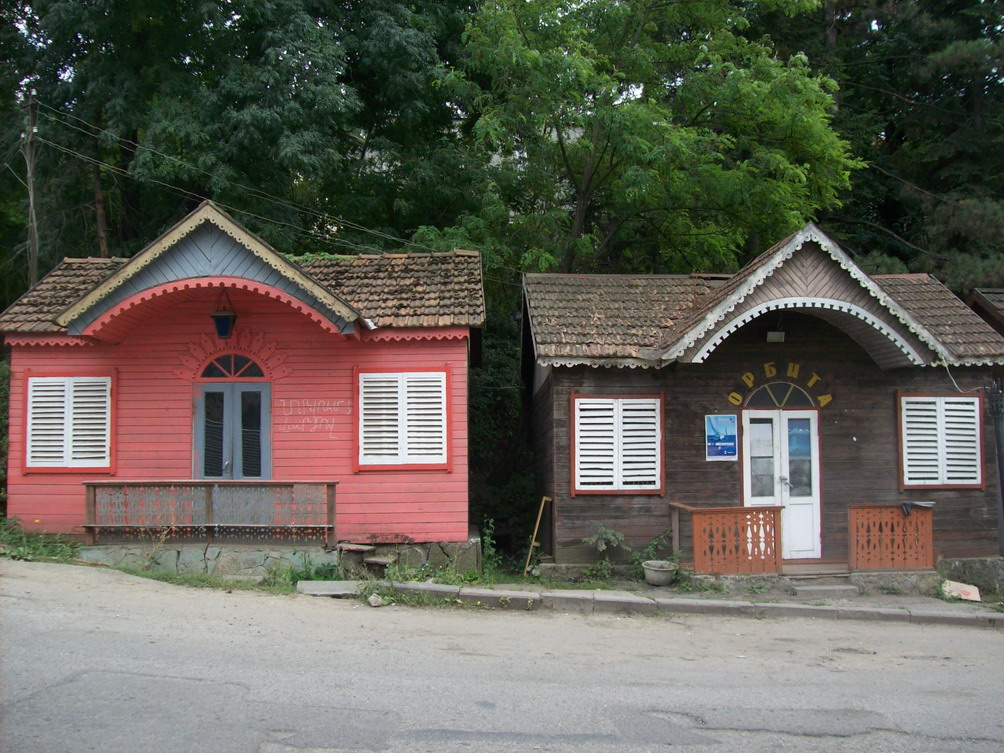
Traditional cottages

In 2009, it was announced by the Armenian government that Dilijan will turn into a developed financial centre for Armenia and the region. According to government officials, many of the operations and responsibilities of the Central Bank of Armenia will move the northern town-resort of Dilijan, starting from 2013.

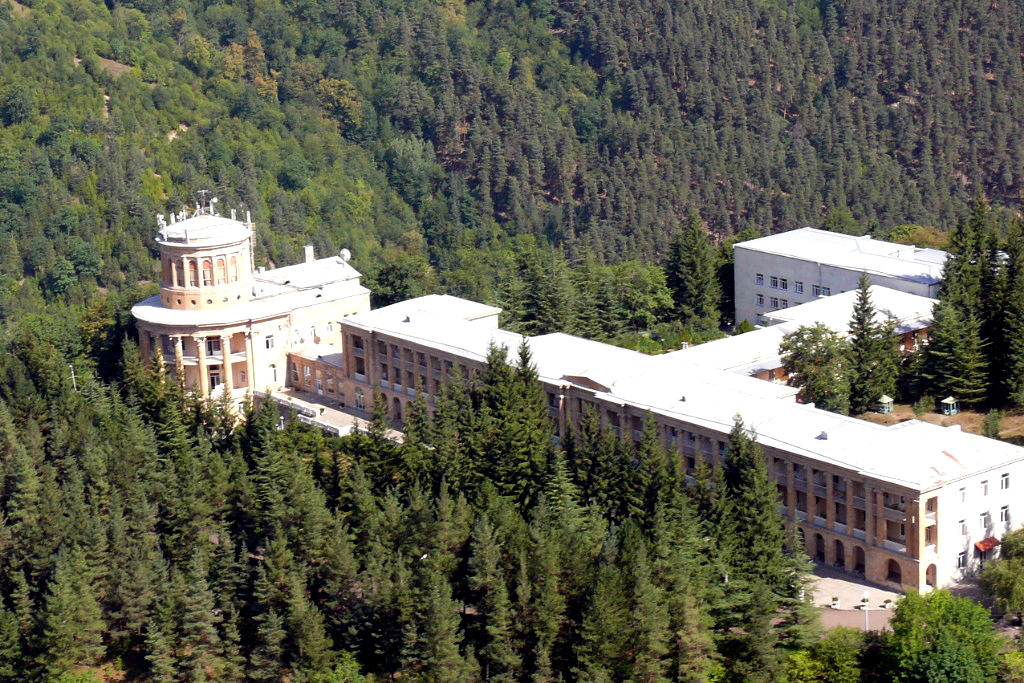
Lernayin Hayastan sanatorium in Dilijan

Currently, many significant financial and cultural institutions are operating in the town such as the Dilijan regional financial and banking centre, the United World College Dilijan, the Old Dilijan-Tufenkian Centre, the modern building of Dilijan theatre and the Dilijan Museum. The central amphitheatre of Dilijan is the venue of many summer festivals and cultural events.

Dilijan is among the favorite destinations for local and foreign tourists. The town has a number of high-class hotels and sanatoriums, allowing the visitors the chance to enjoy the beauty of the National Park as well as the historical sites. The town is also famous for its mineral curing water fountains.

In 2017, the Transcaucasian Trail began construction in Dilijan National Park. When complete, the trail will span the length of Armenia, from the Armenian-Iranian border and into neighbouring Georgia. As of May 2020 there is approximately 100 kilometres of trail within the Dilijan region that is complete and open to hikers, with many routes passing by monasteries in the region.

== Education ==
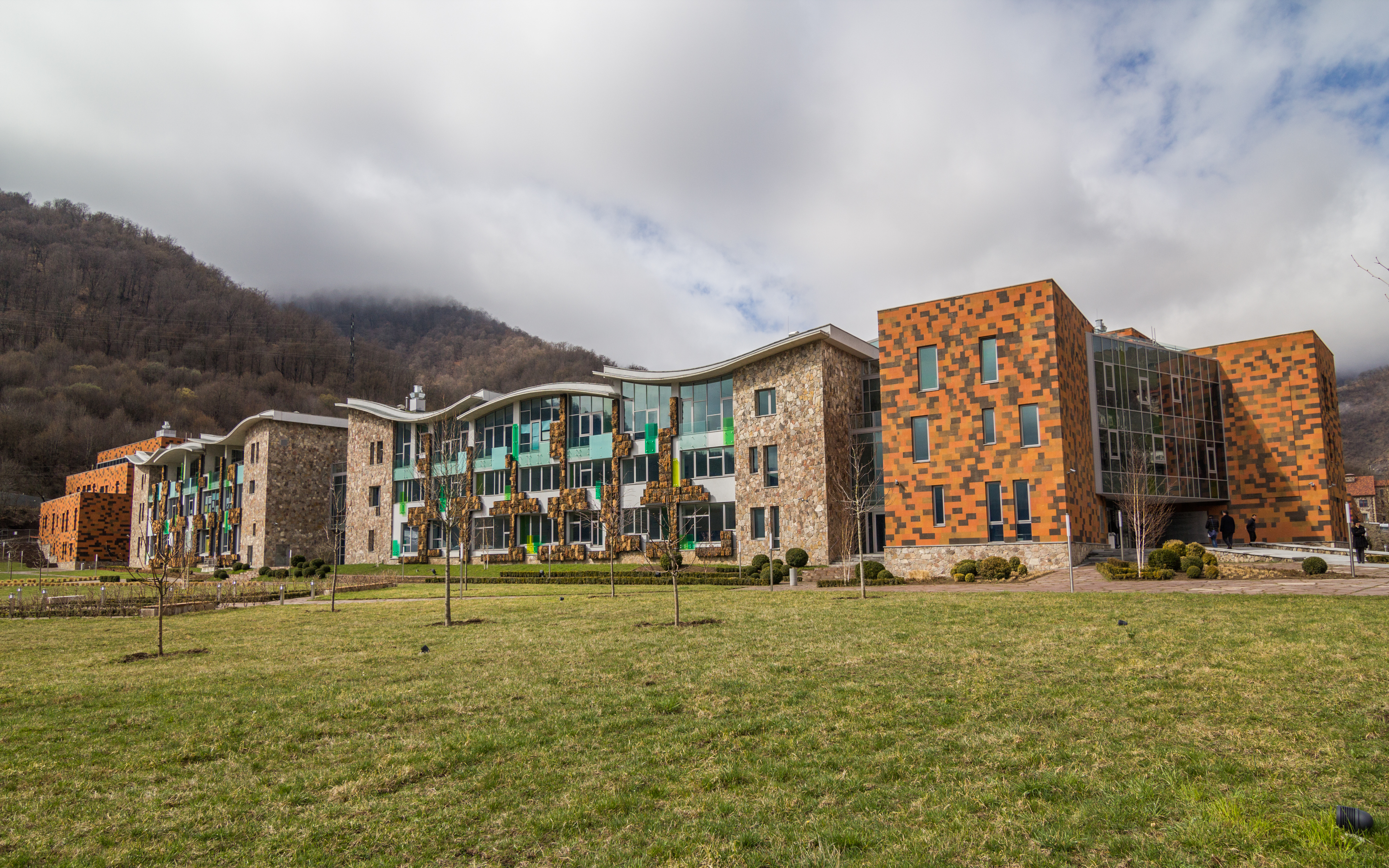
United World College Dilijan campus opened its doors in fall 2014

As of 2009, Dilijan had 5 public education schools and 6 kindergartens with 2250 students and 350 children respectively. A music academy and another one for arts are also operating in the town.

Dilijan has an operating branch of the Yerevan State Academy of Fine Arts. Three intermediate colleges for medicine, arts and crafts are also operating in the town.

With a cost of US$80 million, the Central Bank of Armenia's Educational Center was opened in Dilijan in 2013. Around 150 employees of the Central Bank moved from Yerevan to Dilijan along with their families on the step towards the transformation of the town into a regional financial center.

In 2014, the United World College Dilijan, a part of the global educational movement United World Colleges, was opened in the town.

The construction of the Dilijan Central School was launched in 2013 by the Ayb Educational Foundation with the cooperation of the Central Bank of Armenia. In autumn 2015, the newly built state-of-the-art school was officially opened.

In 2017, the Monte Melkonian Military College of the Ministry of Defence of Armenia was moved from the capital Yerevan to Dilijan. It is housed in an up-to-date complex built between 2011 and 2016 with an approximate cost of AMD 26 billion (around US$ 54.4 million).

== Sport ==
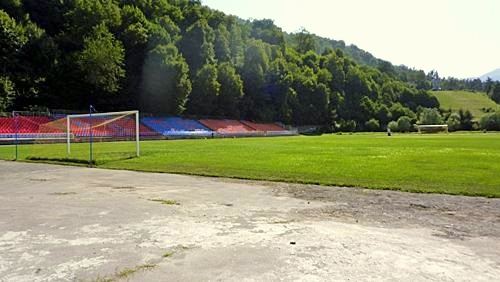
Dilijan City Stadium

Dilijan has an all-seater municipal stadium with a capacity of 2,200 spectators. The Dilijan City Stadium was the home venue of the former Armenian Premier League club Impuls FC.

Impuls FC founded in 1985, represented the town in domestic football competitions. However, after spending many successful seasons in the top tier of the Armenian football league system, the club was dissolved in 2013 due to financial difficulties, like many other Armenian football teams.

== Twin towns – sister cities ==
Dilijan is twinned with:

- Delijan, Iran (2017)
- Pyatigorsk, Russia (2018)
- Roman, Romania (2012)

== Notable natives ==
- Rudolf Vatinyan (1941-2021), Armenian cinematographer.

== See also ==
- Dilijan National Park
- Lake Parz
- UWC Dilijan
