= Lake Parz =

Lake in Armenia

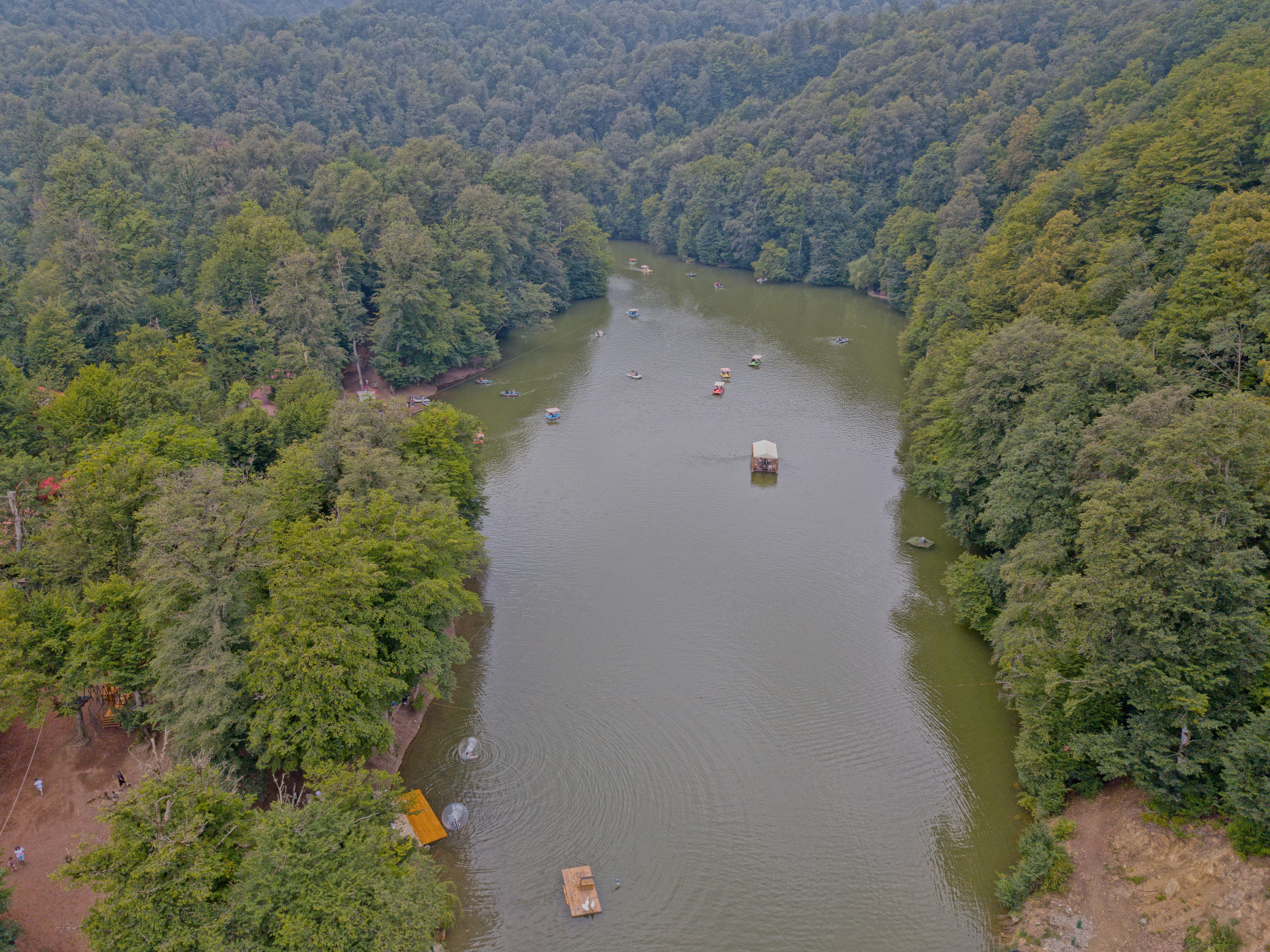
- Lake Parz in the mountains near Dilijan, Armenia

- Location within Armenia Location within Caucasus Mountains
- Interactive map of Lake Parz
- Location: Tavush Province, Armenia
- Coordinates: 40°45′05″N 44°57′38″E
- Basin countries: Armenia
- Max. length: 0.35 km (0.22 mi)
- Max. width: 0.1 km (0.062 mi)
- Surface area: 0.03 km^{2} (0.012 sq mi)
- Surface elevation: 1,334 m (4,377 ft)
- Settlements: Dilijan

Lake Parz (Armenian: Պարզ լիճ, romanized: Parz lich, lit. 'Clear Lake') is a small lake located in the Dilijan National Park east of Dilijan in Armenia. The lake was formed by natural climatic changes.

In 2017, the Transcaucasian Trail was created to connect Parz Lake with the town of Dilijan and in the opposite direction with Gosh village and Gosh Lake. The trail was created through the building of new trail segments to connect existing trails or dirt roads together.

In 2018, a new trail that loops around the lake was built.

There is a restaurant, paddle boats, ropes course and zip lines around the lake.

== Gallery ==
Lake Parz

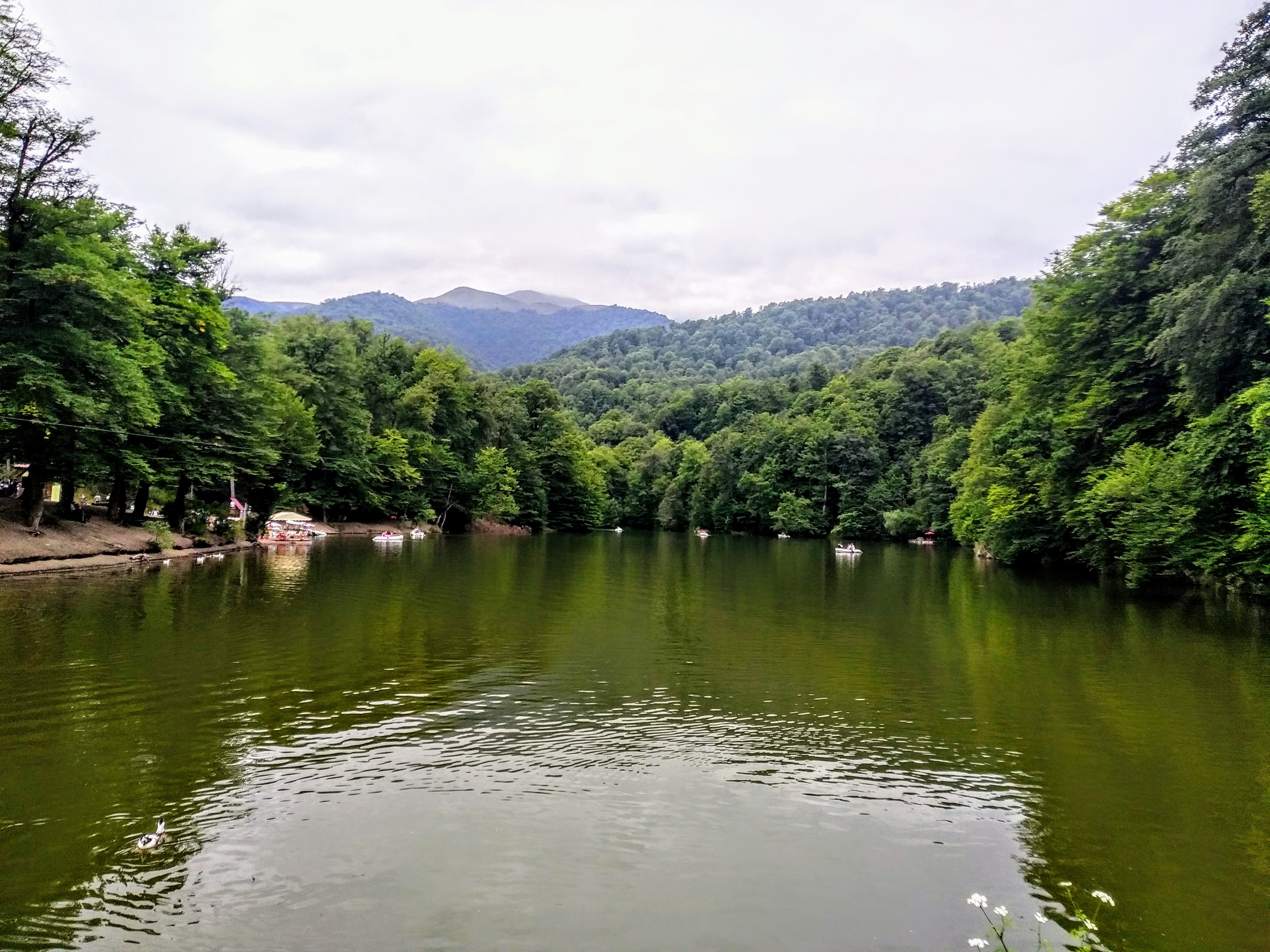

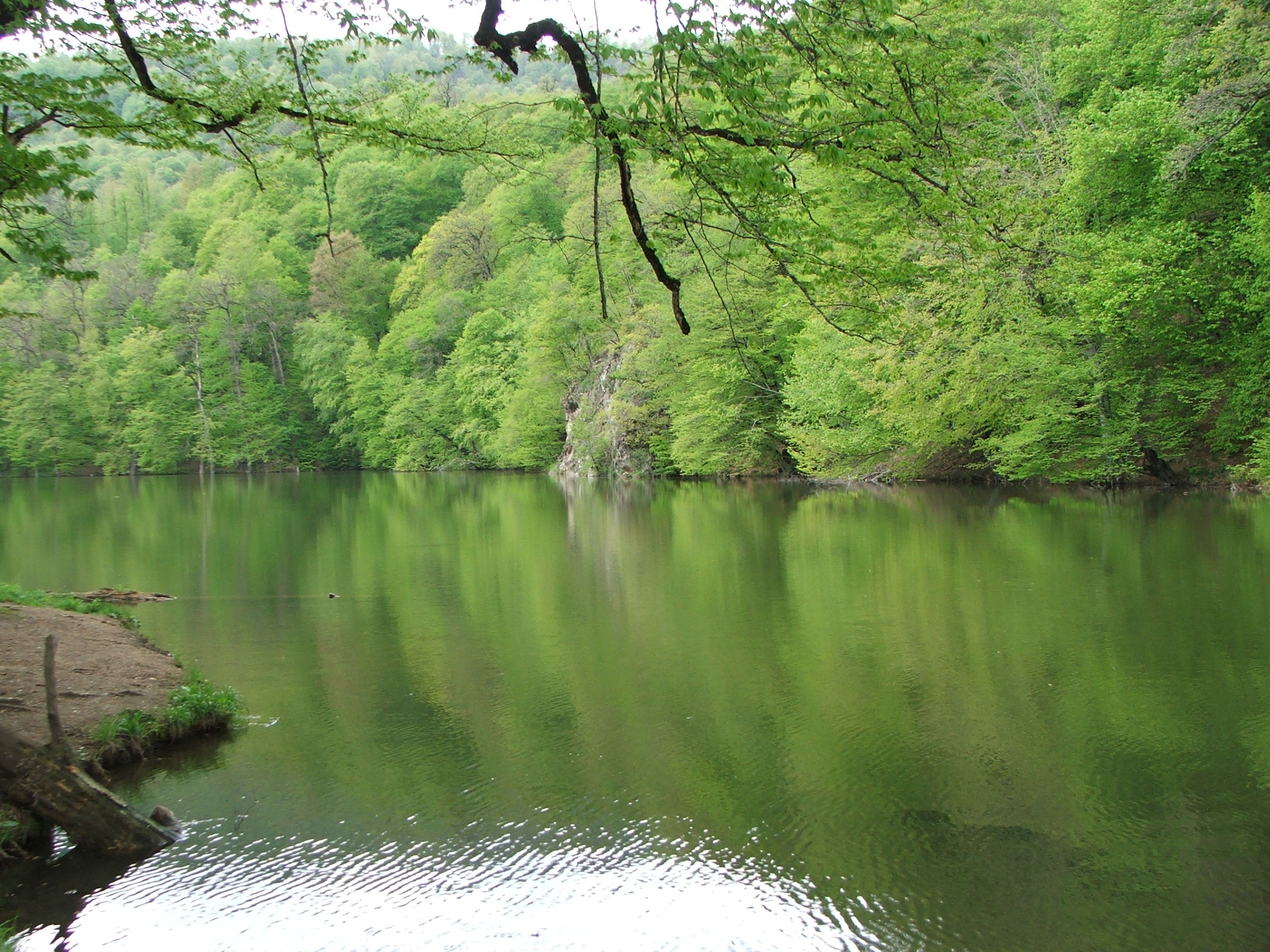

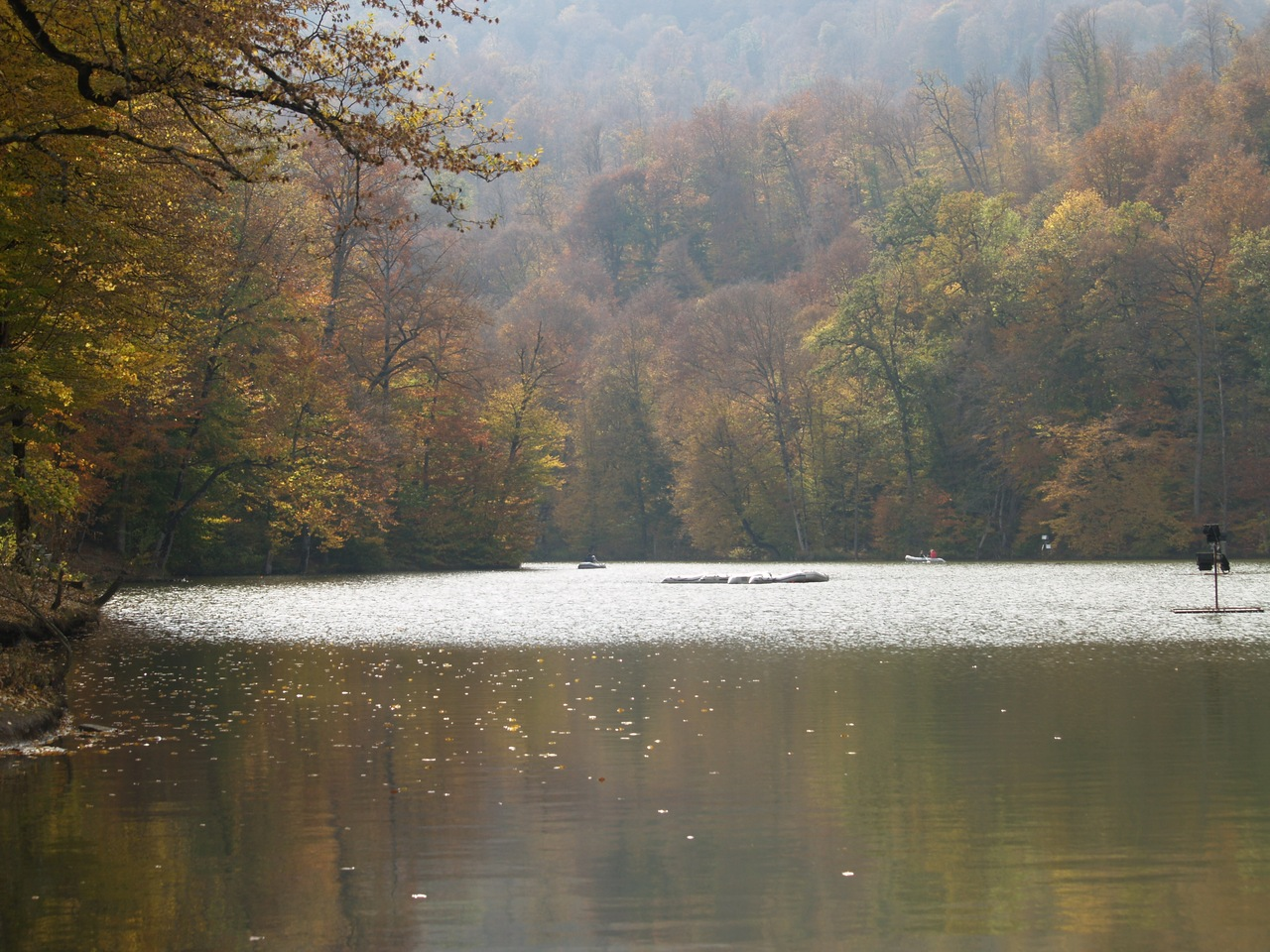

== See also ==
- Lake Sevan
- Dilijan National Park
