= Matosavank =

13th-century small Armenian monastery

Matosavank Մաթոսավանք
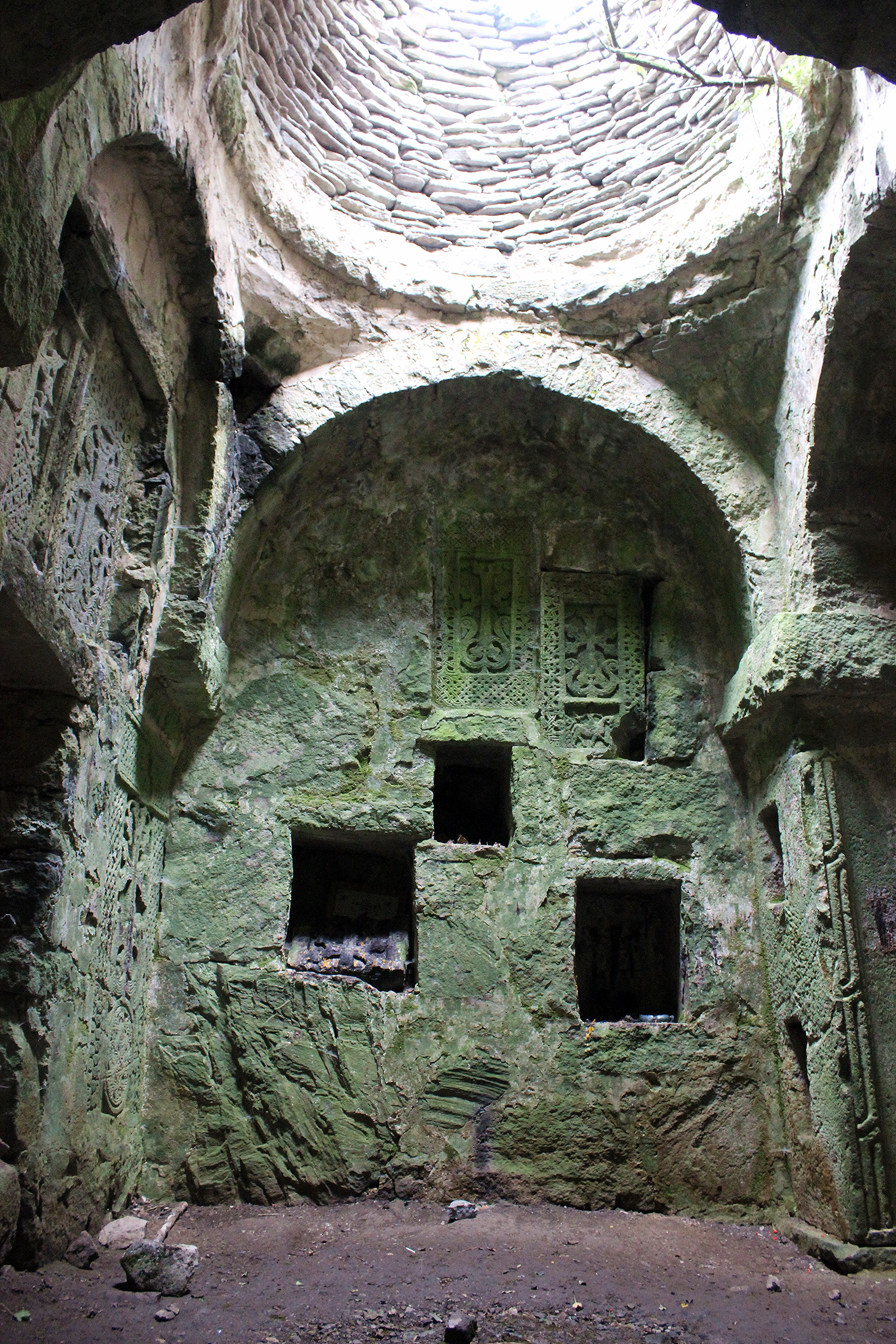
- Matosavank interior

- Location within Armenia Location within Tavush

Religion
- Affiliation: Armenian Apostolic Church
- Status: Ruins

Location
- Location: Near Dilijan, Tavush Province, Armenia
- Coordinates: 40.7553°N 44.8081°E

Architecture
- Type: Small cruciform central-plan
- Style: Armenian
- Completed: 1247

Matosavank (Armenian: Մաթոսավանք) is 13th-century small Armenian church, hidden in a forested area of Dilijan National Park 3 km northwest from the town of Dilijan in the Tavush Province of Armenia. It sits close to the monastery of Jukhtak Vank as well as to a nearby cemetery. The church is currently in ruins and is relatively difficult to find since trail markers are often misleading.

Matosavank was constructed with the oversight of Avag, the son of Ivane of the Mkhargrdzeli dynasty after having vowed his submission to the Mongol invading armies. He later became the military leader of Georgian and Armenian combined forces under Möngke Khan, the fourth Great Khan of the Mongol Empire.

== Architecture ==
The small church of Surb Astvatsatsin of Pghndzahank was built in 1247 and actually consists of two adjoining churches. It was constructed from roughly hewn stones that have been overlaid with plaster within the interior of the building. Rooms include a main hall, book depositories, a portico and each have vaulted ceilings that still stand mostly intact. The western walls of the church sit adjacent to the portico, whereas the southern wall at the altar joins the book depository. Upon the exterior of the structure there is an inscription that tells about the foundation of the church. Some of the tile roofing can still be seen.

== Gallery ==
Map showing Matosavank in relation to Dilijan.

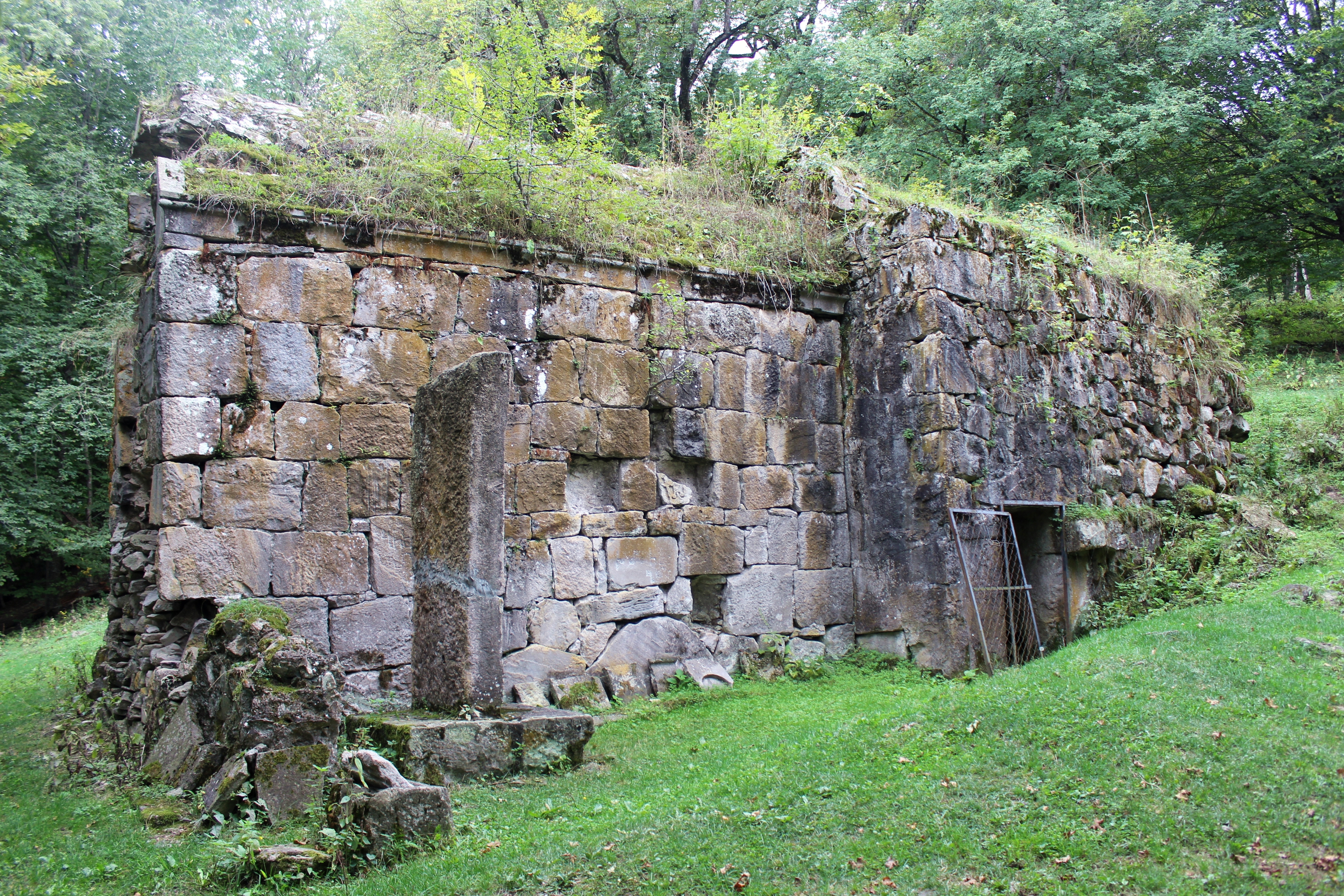
Exterior view of Matosavank

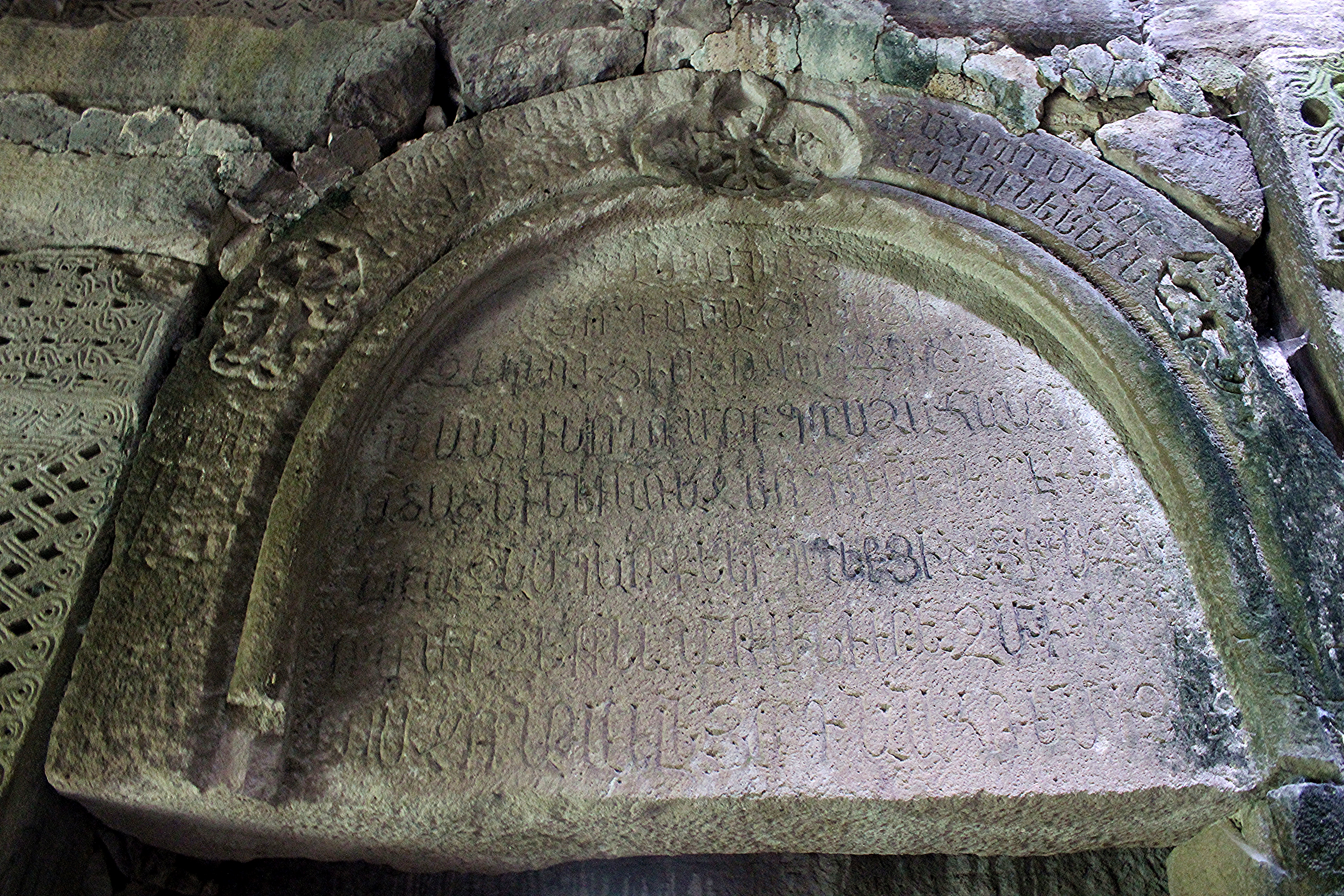
Inscription written upon the interior tympanum of S. Astvatsatsin of Pghndzahank
