= Jukhtak =

Church building in Dilijan National Park, Armenia

Jukhtak Vank Ջուխտակ վանք
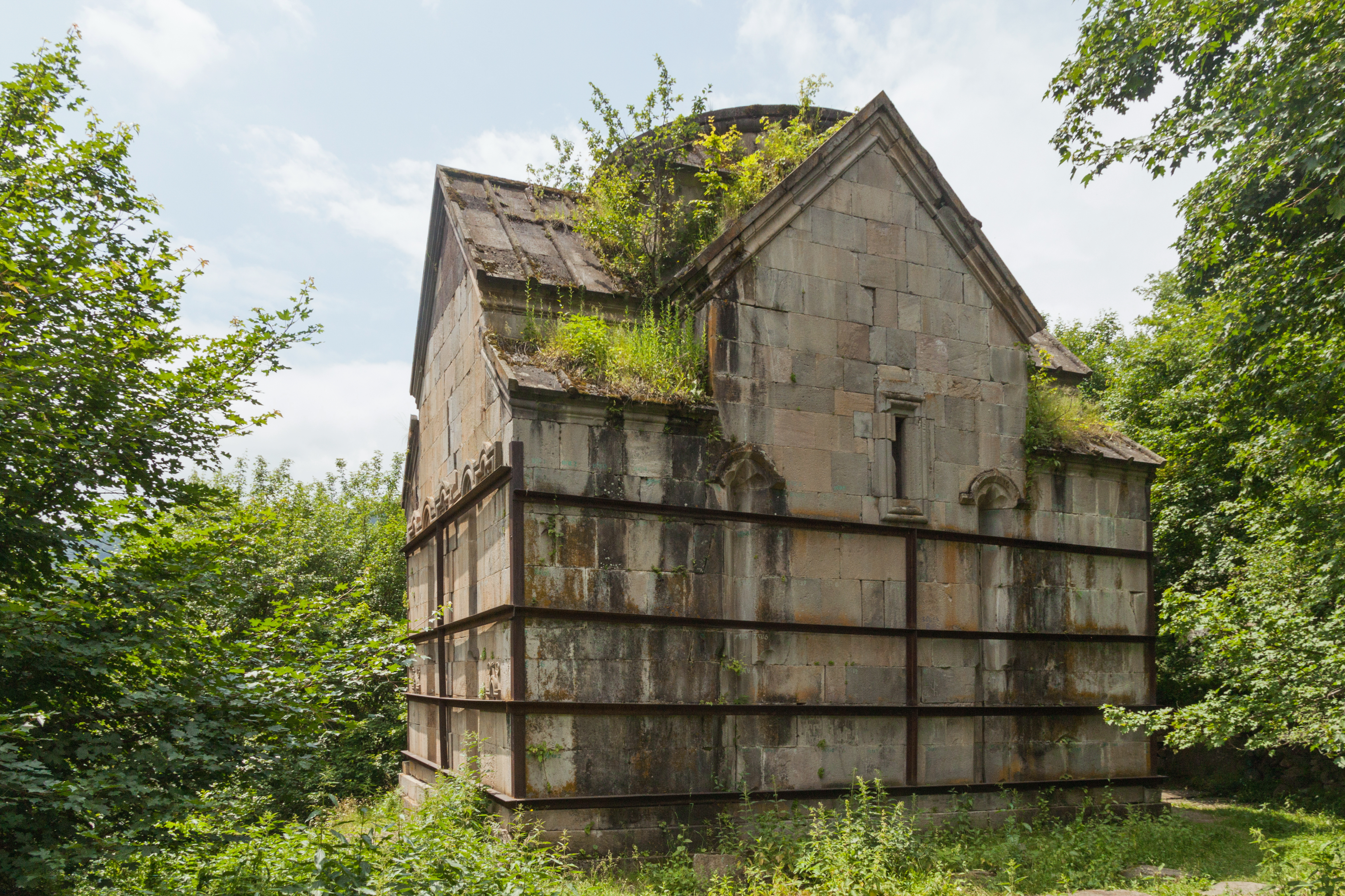
- S. Grigor Church

- Location within Armenia Location within Tavush

Religion
- Affiliation: Armenian Apostolic Church
- Status: Abandoned

Location
- Location: Near Dilijan, Tavush Province, Armenia
- Coordinates: 40.7583°N 44.8183°E

Architecture
- Type: Small cruciform central-plan
- Style: Armenian
- Completed: S. Grigor Church, 11th or 12th century. S. Astvatsatsin Church, 1201
- Dome: 1 (collapsed)

Jukhtak (Armenian: Ջուխտակ վանք) is an 11th or 12th-century monastery situated in a clearing within Dilijan National Park, 3.2 km northwest from the town of Dilijan in the Tavush Province of Armenia. It sits in close proximity to the church of Matosavank as well as a cemetery that surrounds the church.

== Architecture ==
The larger church of Surb Grigor has a small cruciform central-plan, with one portal and had a single dome and drum that collapsed long ago. Exterior walls still stand intact, yet metal reinforcements currently surround the structure to keep its walls from collapsing (likely put into place during 1973-77 when some reconstruction efforts took place). S. Grigor is likely to have been built in the 11th or 12th century.

The smaller church of Surb Astvatsatsin sits near S. Grigor to the west and has the following inscription written upon it:

"In the year 1201, in the Amirdom of Lasha and the Khanate of [...], I Hayrapet, abbot of Surb Petros Monastery, built Surb Astvatsatsin with the hope that every sunrise in both vestibules one mass will be offered for me and one for my brother Shmavon, and in all the churches for my parents."

Media reports from 2012 and 2018 noted traces of vandalism (graffiti) and general neglect of the site.

== Gallery ==
Map showing Jukhtak Vank in relation to Dilijan.
