= Dilijan National Park =

National park in Armenia

- IUCN category II (national park)
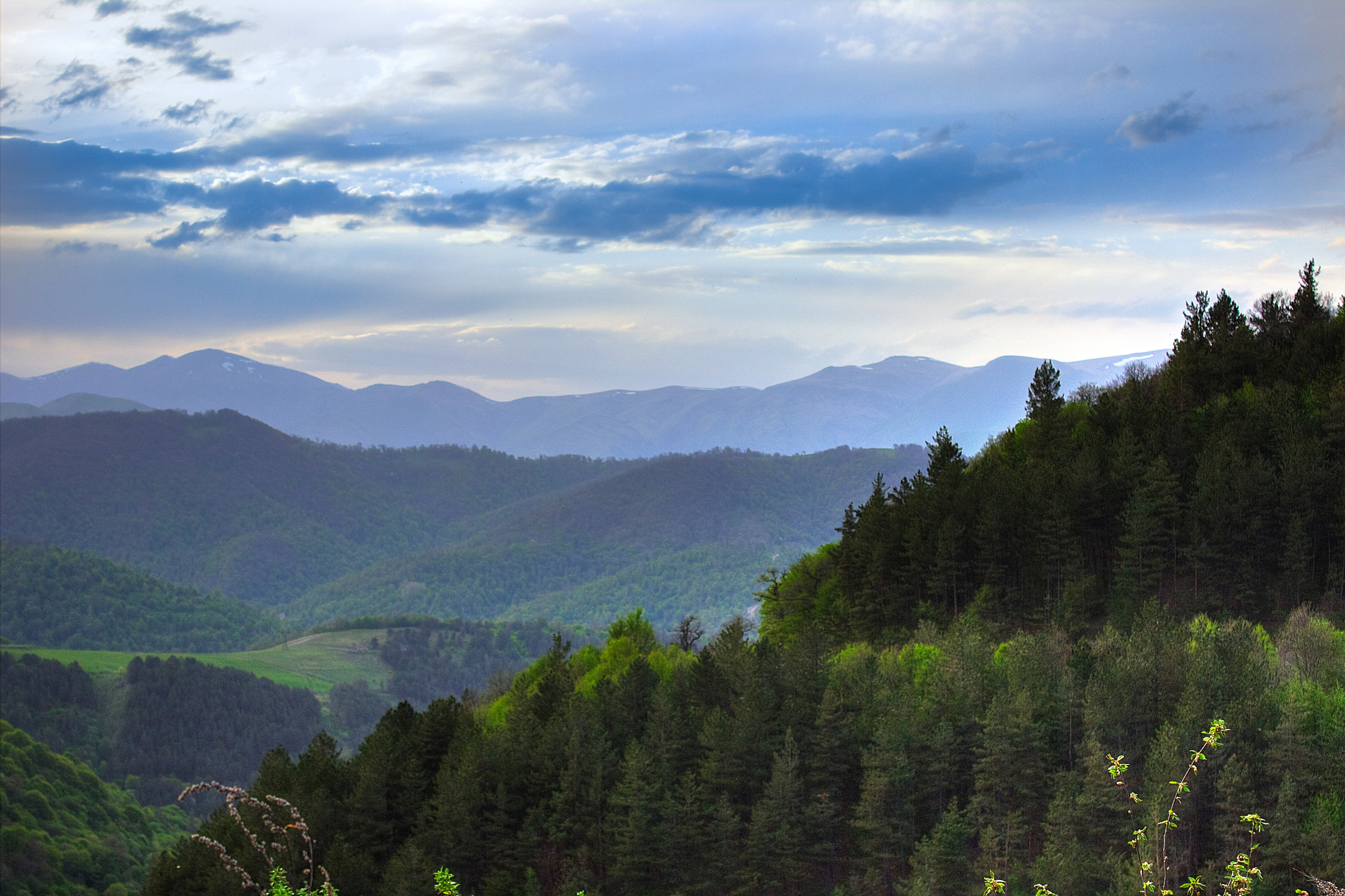

- Location within Armenia
- Location: Tavush Province, Armenia
- Coordinates: 40°39′23″N 45°01′17″E
- Area: 240 km^{2} (93 sq mi)
- Established: 1958 as a reserve, 2002 as a national park
- Governing body: Ministry of Nature Protection, Armenia

Dilijan National Park (Armenian: Դիլիջան ազգային պարկ, romanized: Dilijan azgayin park) is one of the four national parks of Armenia. Occupying an area of 240 km², it is located in the north-eastern Tavush Province of Armenia. It is known for its forest landscapes, rich biodiversity, medicinal mineral water springs, natural and cultural monuments, and extensive network of hiking trails.

== History ==
Dilijan National Park was established in 2002 on the basis of the state nature reserve, which in its turn was established in 1958 on the basis of the former Dilijan and Kuybishev forest enterprises. The territory of the newly established national park has stayed unchanged.

The change of the status of Dilijan State Reserve to Dilijan National Park was conditioned by several objective reasons, such as inevitability of commercial activity in the area, presence of numerous settlements, including Dilijan town with its mineral water resorts, Yerevan-Ijevan railway line passing through its whole territory and others. Currently, the general plan of the national park is under development, including the clarification of the borders and mapping of economic, recreational and buffer zones of the national park.

Between 2017 and 2018, significant redevelopment of the park's tourism offer was undertaken, including the rehabilitation of the existing ecotourism trail network, together with the addition of an 80 km-long section of the Transcaucasian Trail.

== Geography ==
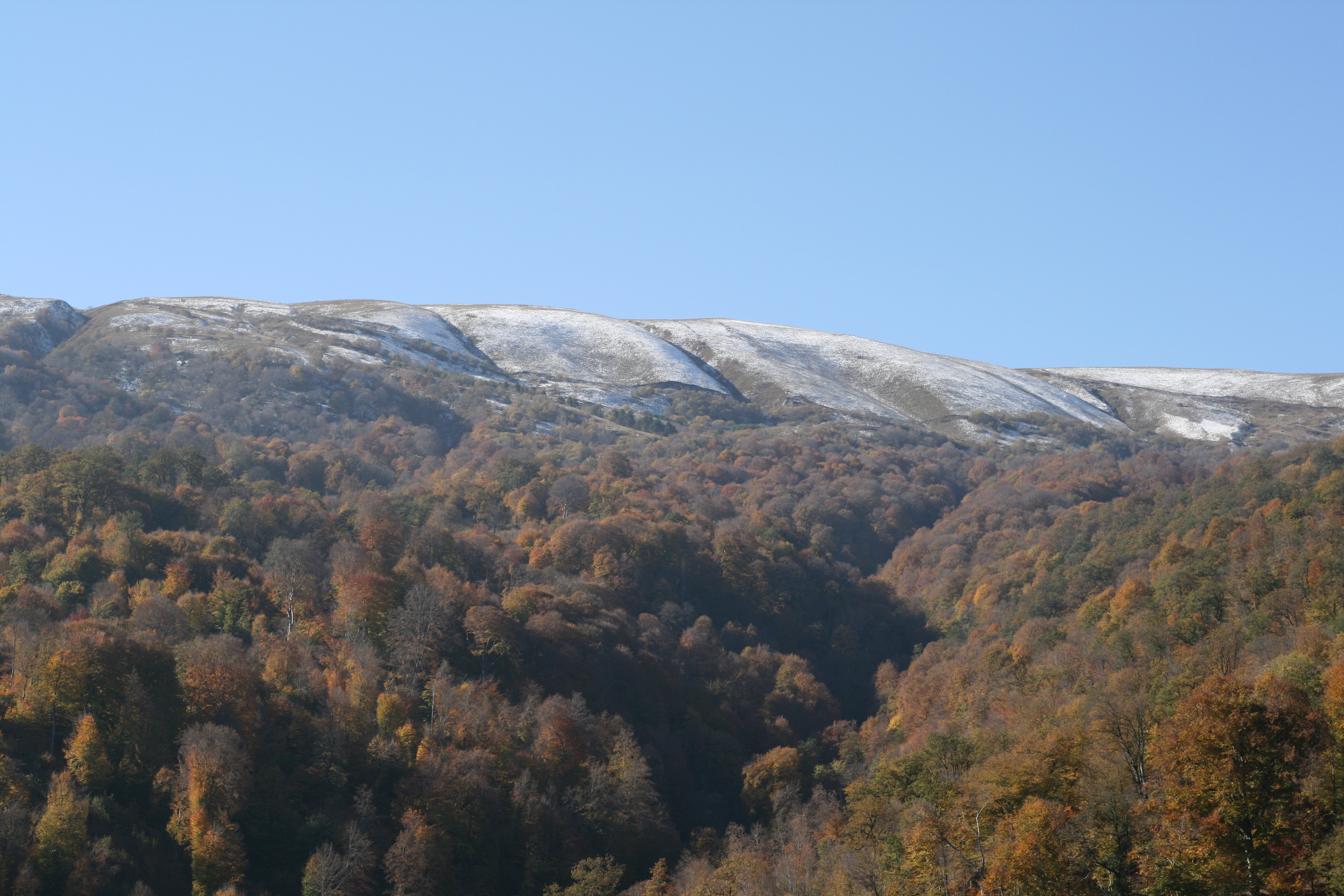
Dilijan, Middle Caucasus

The national park stretches over the slopes of the Pambak, Areguni, Miapor, Ijevan (Kaeni) and Halab mountain ranges at the altitude of 1070–2300 m above sea level. The mountain meadows above this altitudes do not belong to the national park. The River Aghstev and its main tributaries – the Rivers Hovajur, Shtoghanajur, Bldan, Haghartsin and Getik run through the national park. There are Parz Lich (Clear Lake), Goshi Lich (Gosh Lake) and Tzrkalich (Leech Lake) as well as other minor lakes.

== Flora ==
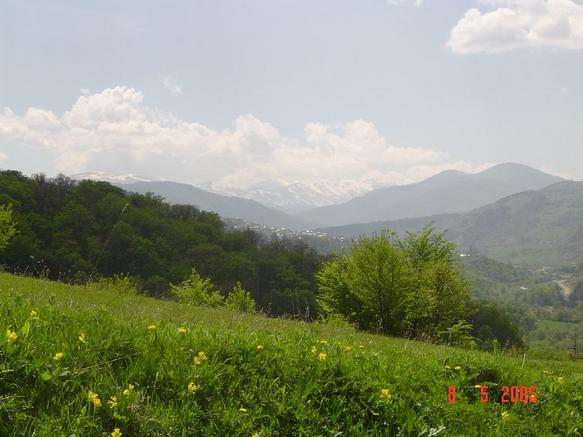
Dilijan National Park

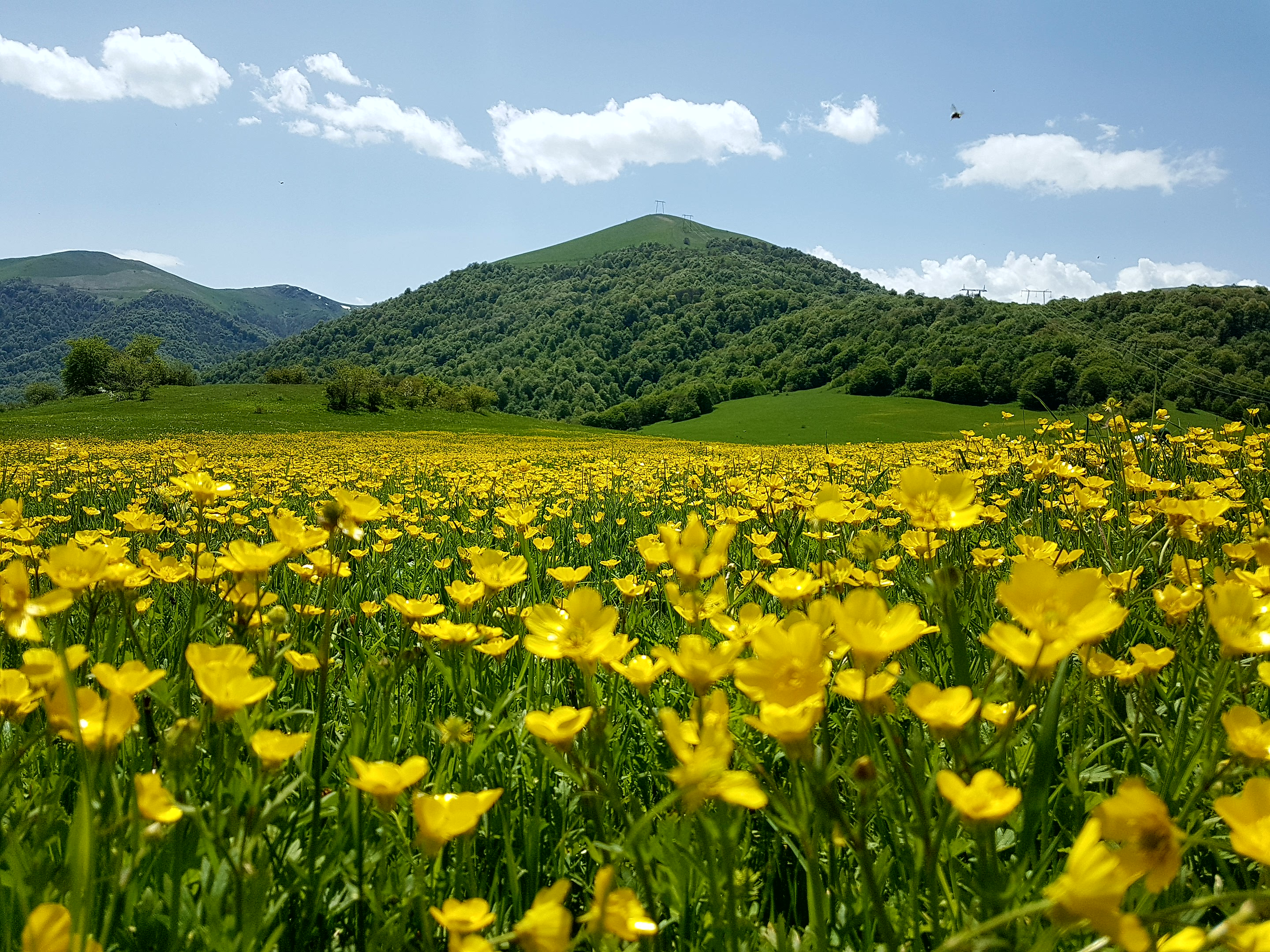
Dilijan forests

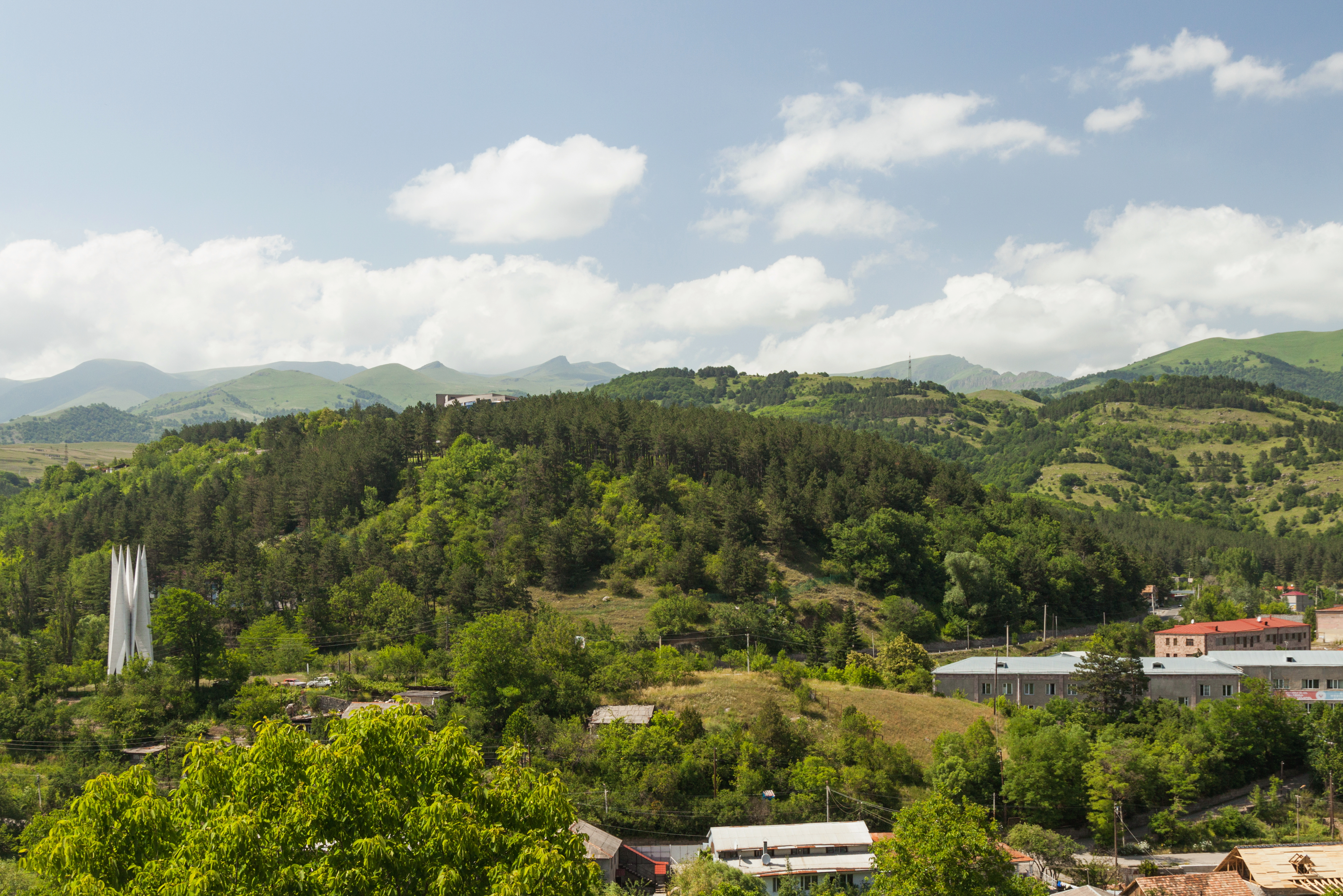
Dilijan forests

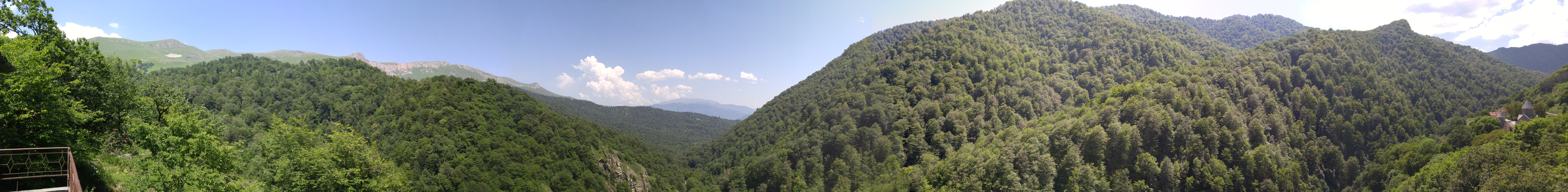
Panoramic view of Dilijan National Park, near Haghartsin Monastery.

The flora of Dilijan National Park includes 902 species of vascular plants, namely Lycopodium (1 species), Horse-tails (1), ferns (12), gymnosperms (7) and angiosperms (881). About 40 rare species of plants occur in this territory. 29 species of the flora are registered in the Red Book of Endangered Species of Armenia and 4 in the Red Data Book of the USSR.

The vegetation of the national park is of mesophilous Caucasian type mainly represented by forest associations. It mainly consists of deciduous species such as oaks (Quercus petraea subsp. polycarpa, Q. macranthera), Oriental beech (Fagus orientalis), common and Oriental hornbeam (Carpinus betulus, Carpinus orientalis), which form homogeneous oak, beech and hornbeam forests as well as mixed forests with different combinations of the species mentioned. Georgian oak (Quercus petraea subsp. polycarpa) forests occur on the southern slopes of the middle forest zone and oriental beech forests on the northern slopes. In the upper zone forest consists of Q. macranthera.

Hornbeam occurs mainly in mixed forests. Oriental hornbeam reaches up to 1500 m above sea level, while common hornbeam spreading all over the forest zone up to 2000 m. Different species of lime (Tilia), maple (Acer) and ash (Fraxinus) grow in the middle forest zone and especially the upper limit of higher forest zone. Coniferous forests (pine - Pinus, juniper - Juniperus and yew - Taxus) occupy a limited territory in the national park and occur in patches. Pine often makes dense forests in the basin of the River Hovajur on the slopes of the Areguni and Pambak ranges in the vicinity of serpentine Dilijan highway. There are many pine trees in Dilijan and on nearby slopes.

Juniper sparse forests spread in the valley of the River Getik especially near the river mouth as well as on the dry slopes of the Ijevan Mountains. Juniperus foetidissima is the most predominant species among four juniper species occurring in the national park. There are well conserved juniper stands on the rocky slopes of Mount Abeghakhar in the basin of the River Aghstev.

The forests in the national park are rich in fruit trees and bushes such as oriental apple - Malus orientalis, walnut - Juglans regia, cornel - Cornus mas, plum - Prunus spp., blackthorn - Prunus spinosa, pear - Pyrus communis, gooseberry - Ribes uva-crispa, medlar - Mespilus germanica, common hazelnut - Corylus avellana (see also Hazelnut Reservation), various species of Blackcurrant - Ribes spp., and hawthorn - Crataegus spp. Many species occurring in the national park are well known as medicinal plants (Saint John's wort - Hypericum spp., mint - Mentha, thyme - Thymus, ziziphora - Ziziphora, etc.), edible plants (sorrel - Rumex, falcaria - Falcaria, cow parsnip - Heracleum, etc.), forage (clover - Trifolium, sainfoin - Onobrychis, sea-holly - Eryngium, etc.) or decorative plants (iris, orchids, etc.).

The western rocky slopes of the Ijevan mountain range and Mount Abeghasar are rich in petrophytes and rare plants. Rocks and cliffs serves as a favorable habitat for numerous rare species such as Armenian Saint John's wort (Hypericum armenum), saxifrage (Saxifraga juniperifolia, S. tridactylites), scorzonera (Scorzonera rigida), cephalaria (Cephalaria media), small scabious (Scabiosa columbaria), wild jasmine (Jasminum fruticans) and others. Mount Abeghasar is especially rich in rare species.

Tertiary relict yew and Caucasian rhododendron (Rhododendron caucasicum) are the gems of the national park. The small well conserved yew forest located in the basin of the River Polad was designated as a reservation in 1958 (see Akhnabat Yew Grove Reservation). The second smaller yew forest has been located on the upper stream of the River Aghstev in the gorge Frolova Balka of the Pambak Mountains. Botanists N. Troitski in 1939 and A. Takhtajan in 1954 reported that this younger forest consisting of 100- to 180-, sometimes 220-year-old trees stretched for 4–5 km from the seventh kilometer of Dilijan highway towards Fioletovo village. N. Troitski mentioned also that in the past yew was more abundant. At present, only the remnants of previous dense forest have survived in the form of individual trees in an inaccessible terrain. Groups of yew trees and individual trees occur also over the whole territory of the national park.

Relict species Caucasian rhododendron is also noteworthy, growing on the northern slopes of the Pambak mountains. Rhododendron occurs in the moist meadow vegetation of subalpine zone and stretches westward to Mount Ampasar (the Pambak mountain range) where the largest rhododendron area of Armenia is situated (see Rhododendron Reservation).

== Fauna ==
The fauna of the national park is also rich. There are about 800 species of beetles as well as numerous species of reptiles: smooth snake (Coronella austriaca), Armenian and Dahl's lizards (Darevskia armeniaca, D. dahli etc.); amphibians: marsh frog (Pelophylax ridibundus), European green toad (Bufotes viridis); fish: brown trout (Salmo trutta fario), Kura barbel (Barbus cyri). Birds are also abundant represented by 150 species including Caucasian grouse (Lyrurus mlokosiewiczi), golden eagle (Aquila chrysaetos), bearded vulture (Gypaetus barbatus), Caspian snowcock (Tetraogallus caspius) and others. Over 40 species of mammals are registered in the national park such as red deer (Cervus elaphus), brown bear (Ursus arctos), red fox (Vulpes vulpes), lynx (Lynx), wolf (Canis lupus), wild boar (Sus scrofa), European wildcat (Felis sylvestris), roe deer (Capreolus capreolus), European badger (Meles meles), Caucasian squirrel (Sciurus anomalus) and others. Dilijan National Park is important for the conservation of forest landscapes, recreation and health protection purposes, as well as economic activities due to the presence of favorable conditions.

== Cultural monuments ==
The most important cultural monuments located in Dilijan National Park include Haghartsin Monastery (10-13th centuries), Goshavank (12-13th centuries), Jukhtak Vank (11-13th centuries), Matosavank (10-13th centuries) and Aghavnavank (11th century).

== See also ==
- List of protected areas of Armenia
