= Semyonovka, Armenia =

Village in Gegharkunik, Armenia

Semyonovka Սեմյոնովկա
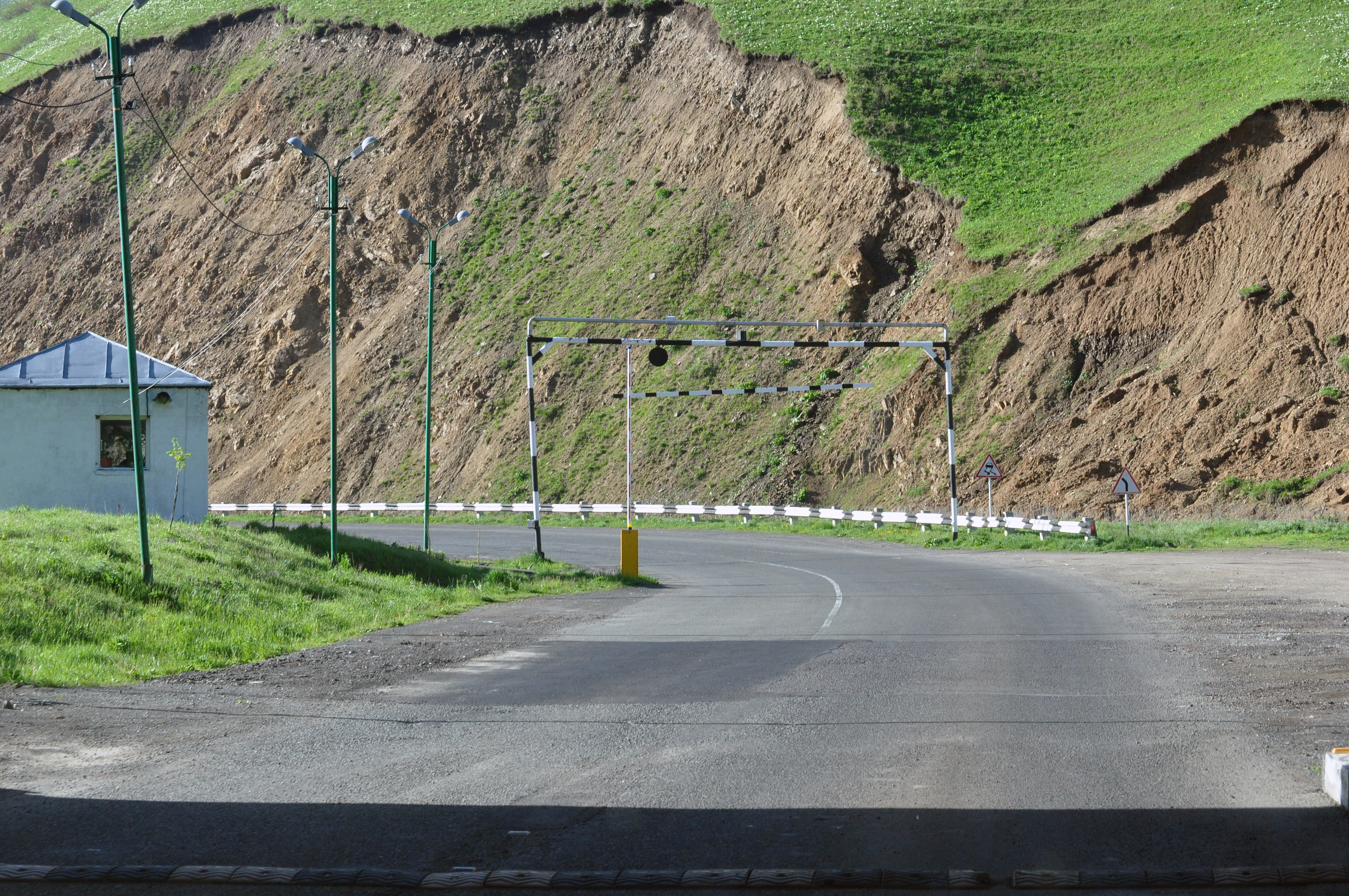
- Road near Semyonovka

- Location within Armenia Location within Gegharkunik
- Coordinates: 40°39′11″N 44°54′35″E
- Country: Armenia
- Province: Gegharkunik
- Municipality: Sevan
- Founded: 1845

Population (2011)
  - Total: 253
- Time zone: UTC+4 (AMT)

Semyonovka (Armenian: Սեմյոնովկա) is a village in the Sevan Municipality of the Gegharkunik Province of Armenia.

== History ==
The village was founded in 1845 by Molokan settlers from Russia (sectarian Pryguny and Subbotniki), who escaped oppression in Russia.
