= Transcaucasian Trail =

Hiking trail under development in Georgia, Azerbaijan, and Armenia

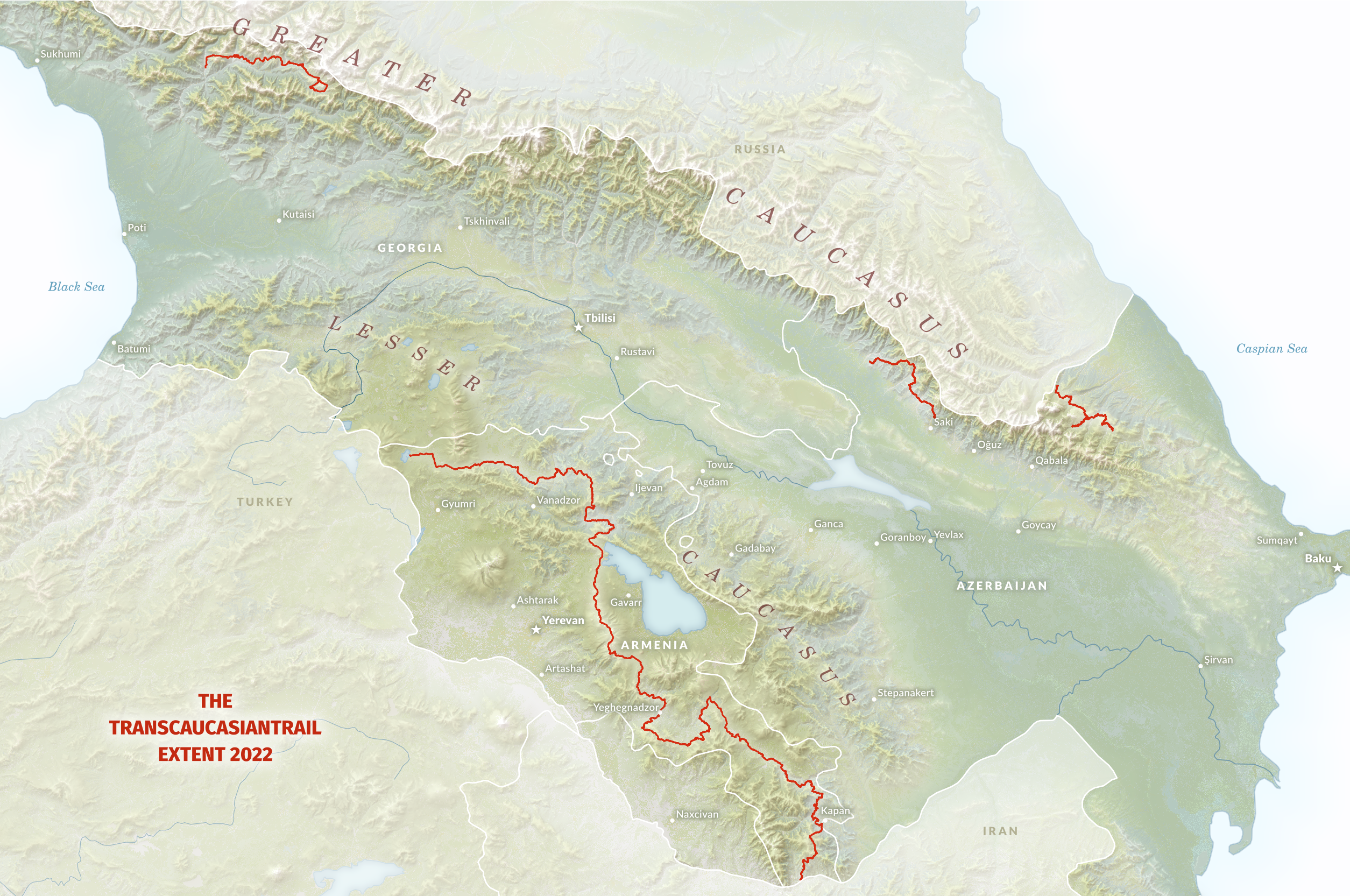
- Areas of the trail as of 2022
- Length: About 3,000km
- Location: Caucasus
- Established: 2015
- Use: Hiking
- Season: Spring–autumn
- Sights: Greater Caucasus, Lesser Caucasus
- Website: transcaucasiantrail.org

The Transcaucasian Trail (TCT) is a long-distance hiking trail under development in the Caucasus through the nations of Georgia, Azerbaijan, and Armenia. It was named one of the world's "100 Greatest Places" by Time magazine in 2019.

Many sections of the TCT already exist and have been used by local community members and shepherds for centuries, as they connect mountain villages.

In 2015, two former Peace Corps volunteers, Paul Stephens and Jeff Haack, mapped and charted known routes in Georgia. During this time they succeeded in locating many connections between known trails and publicizing the concept of a long-distance trail. At the same time, explorer Tom Allen began an attempt to hike the length of Armenia, which was unsuccessful due to an absence of known routes and detailed maps. Allen devised a "Transcaucasian Trail" project to remedy these problems and discovered Stephens's shared vision when attempting to register the same domain name, at which time the two decided to collaborate.

In late 2015, Allen approached vehicle manufacturer Land Rover and the Royal Geographical Society for funding to scout a potential route traversing the Lesser Caucasus through Armenia and southern Georgia, launching the "Transcaucasian Expedition" in April 2016. In July of the same year, Stephens initiated the first trail construction and maintenance project in Svaneti, Georgia, employing international volunteers to carry out the work. The Transcaucasian Trail Association nonprofit organisation and Transcaucasian Trail Armenia NGO were formed later that year.

As of 2025, 1,750 km of trail had been completed across all three participating countries.

The long-term goal is to build two trail corridors of approximately 1,500 km each. The "northern route" would follow the Greater Caucasus Mountains through northern Georgia and Azerbaijan from the Black Sea and the Caspian Sea, though parts of this route are problematic due to conflict zones. Meanwhile, a "southern route" will traverse the Lesser Caucasus Mountains through southern Georgia and Armenia, taking hikers from the Black Sea to the Aras river at Armenia's border with Iran.
