= Aghavnavank Monastery =

Monastic complex in Armenia

Aghavnavank Monastery Աղավնավանք
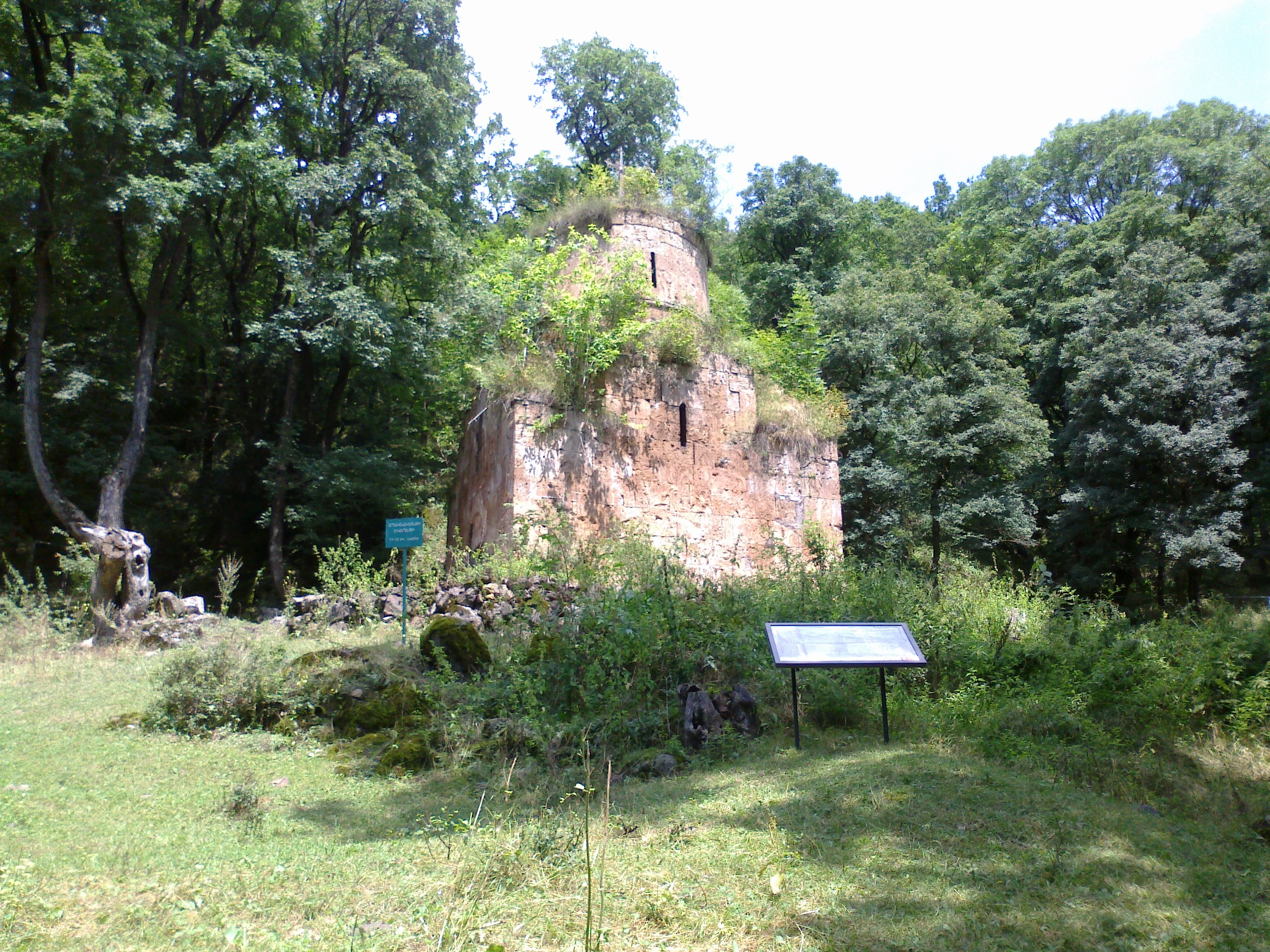

- Location within Armenia

Religion
- Affiliation: Armenian Apostolic Church

Location
- Location: Aghavnavank, Tavush Province, Armenia
- Coordinates: 40.724984°N 45.107594°E

Architecture
- Style: Armenian
- Completed: 12-13th centuries

Aghavnavank Monastery (Armenian: Աղավնավանք, also Anapat St. Astvatsatsin, Aghnabat) is a 12th–13th century monastic complex at Dilijan National Park on the outskirts of Aghavnavank village of the Tavush Province of Armenia.

== Gallery ==
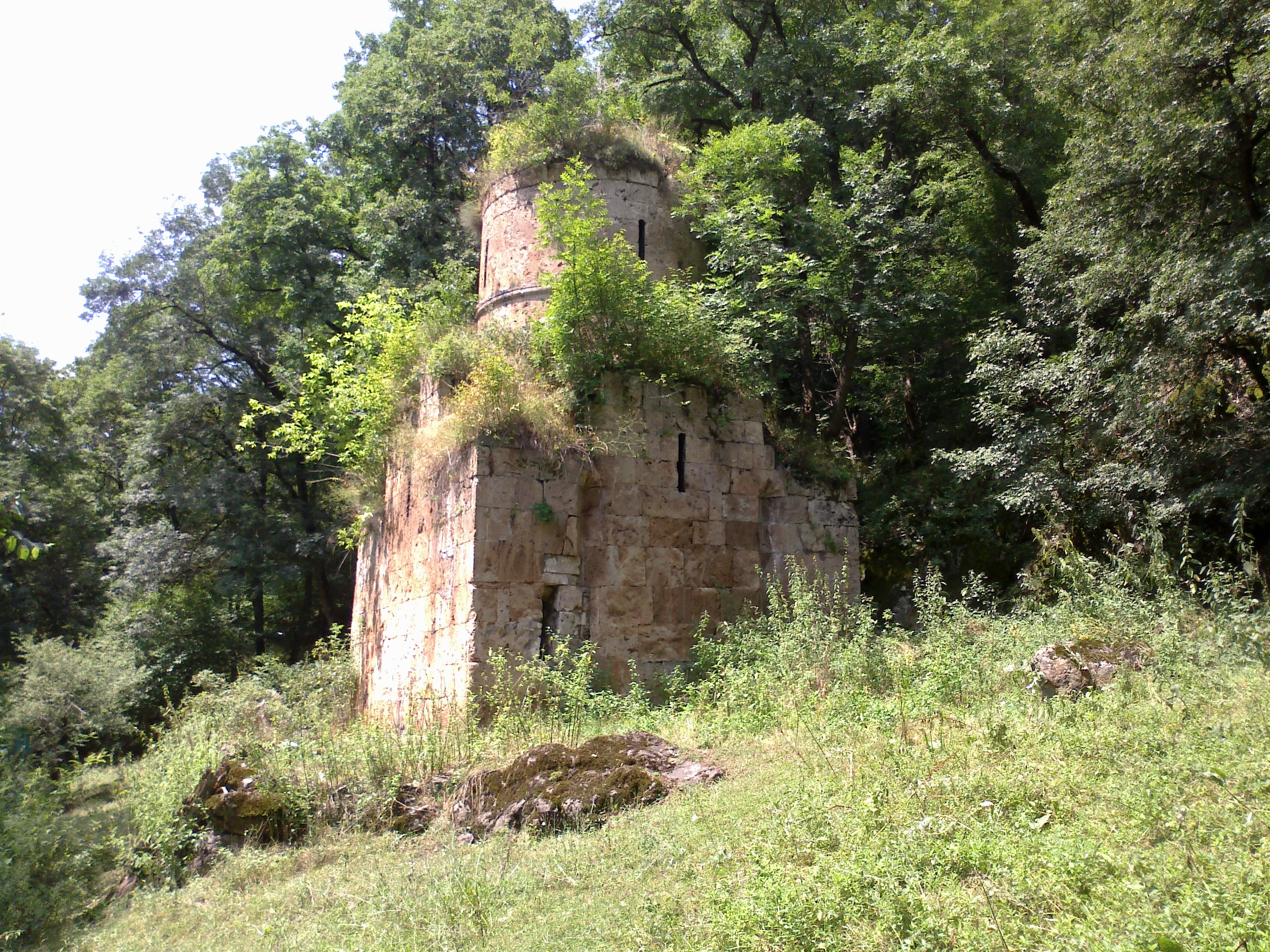

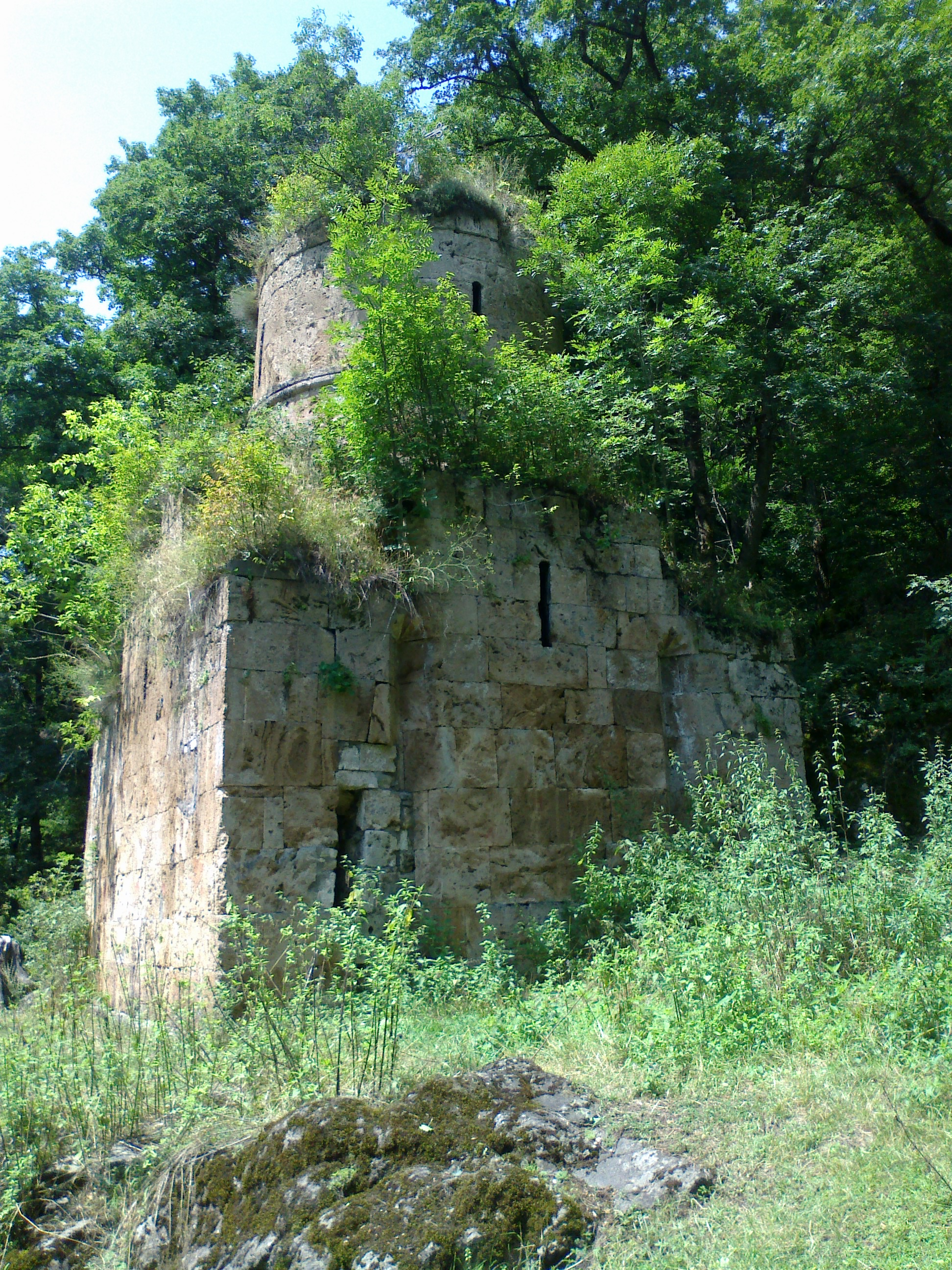

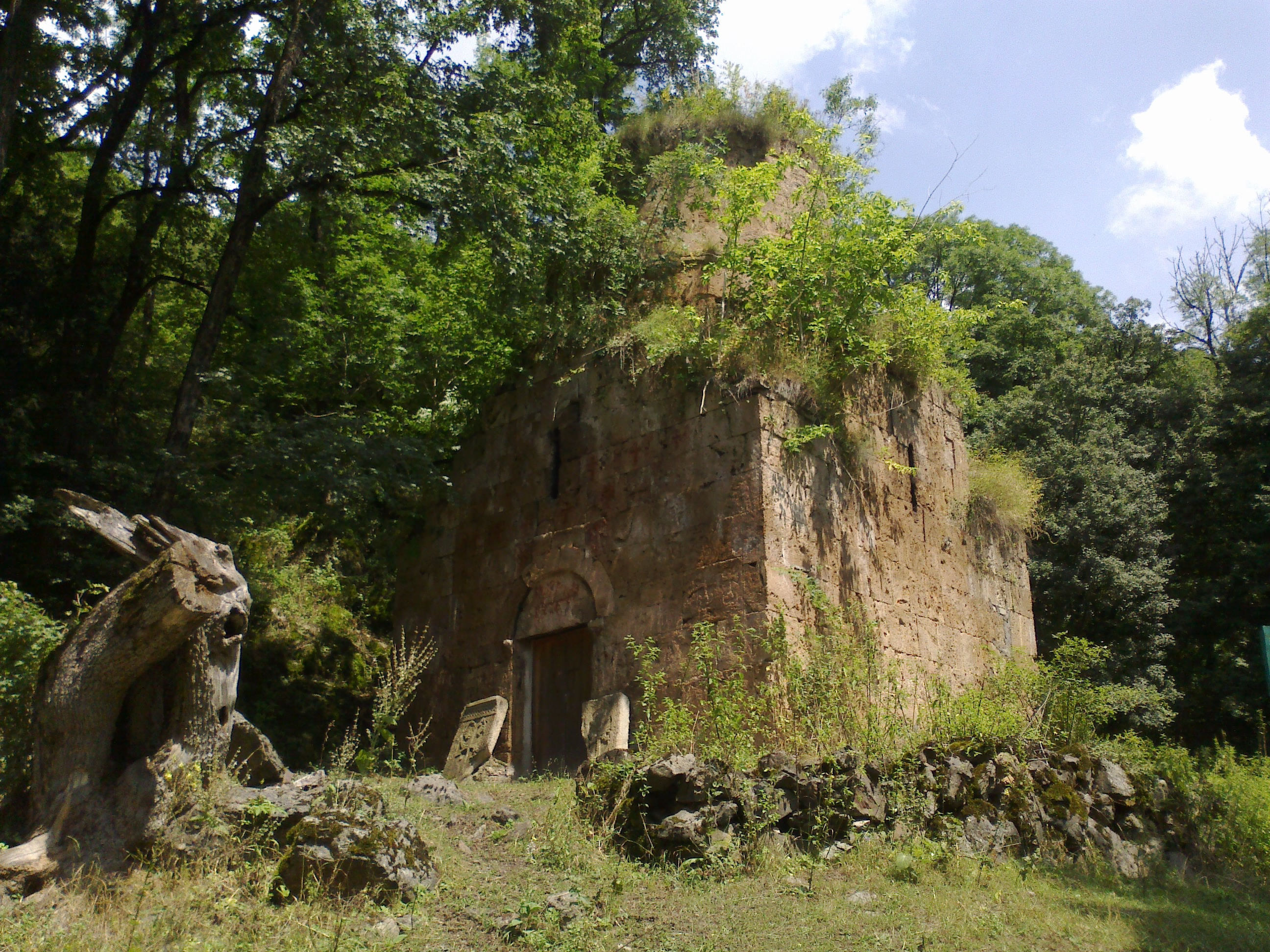
