= Aghavnavank =

Aghavnavank Աղավնավանք
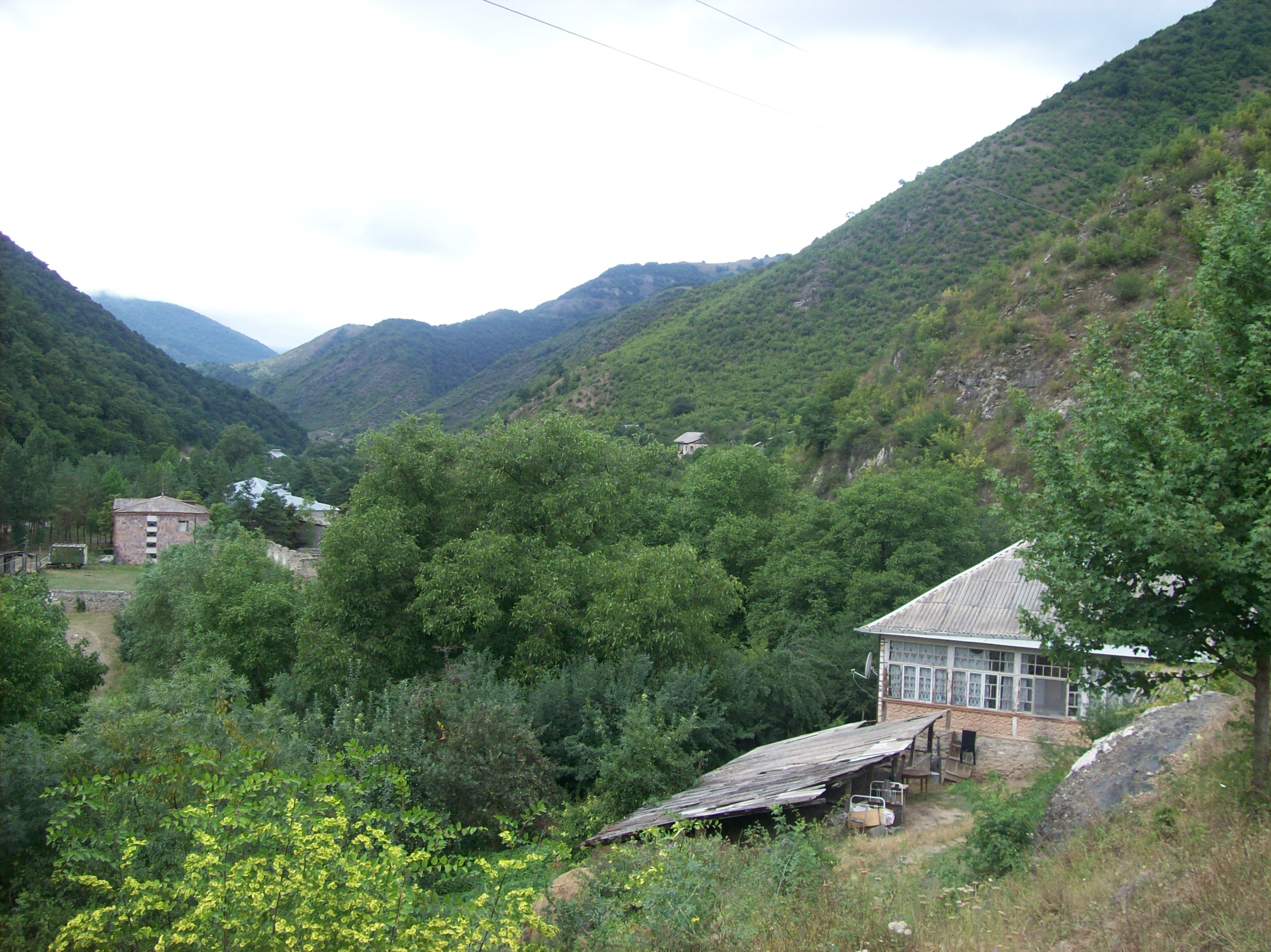
- A view of Aghavnavank

- Location within Armenia Location within Tavush
- Coordinates: 40°43′51″N 45°05′36″E
- Country: Armenia
- Province: Tavush
- Municipality: Dilijan
- Elevation: 1,443 m (4,734 ft)

Population (2011)
  - Total: 337
- Time zone: UTC+4 (AMT)

Aghavnavank (Armenian: Աղավնավանք) is a village in the Dilijan Municipality of the Tavush Province in Armenia.

A hiking trail featuring the 12th/13th-century Aghavnavank Monastery, and a yew grove of the Dilijan National Park is located near the village.

== Gallery ==
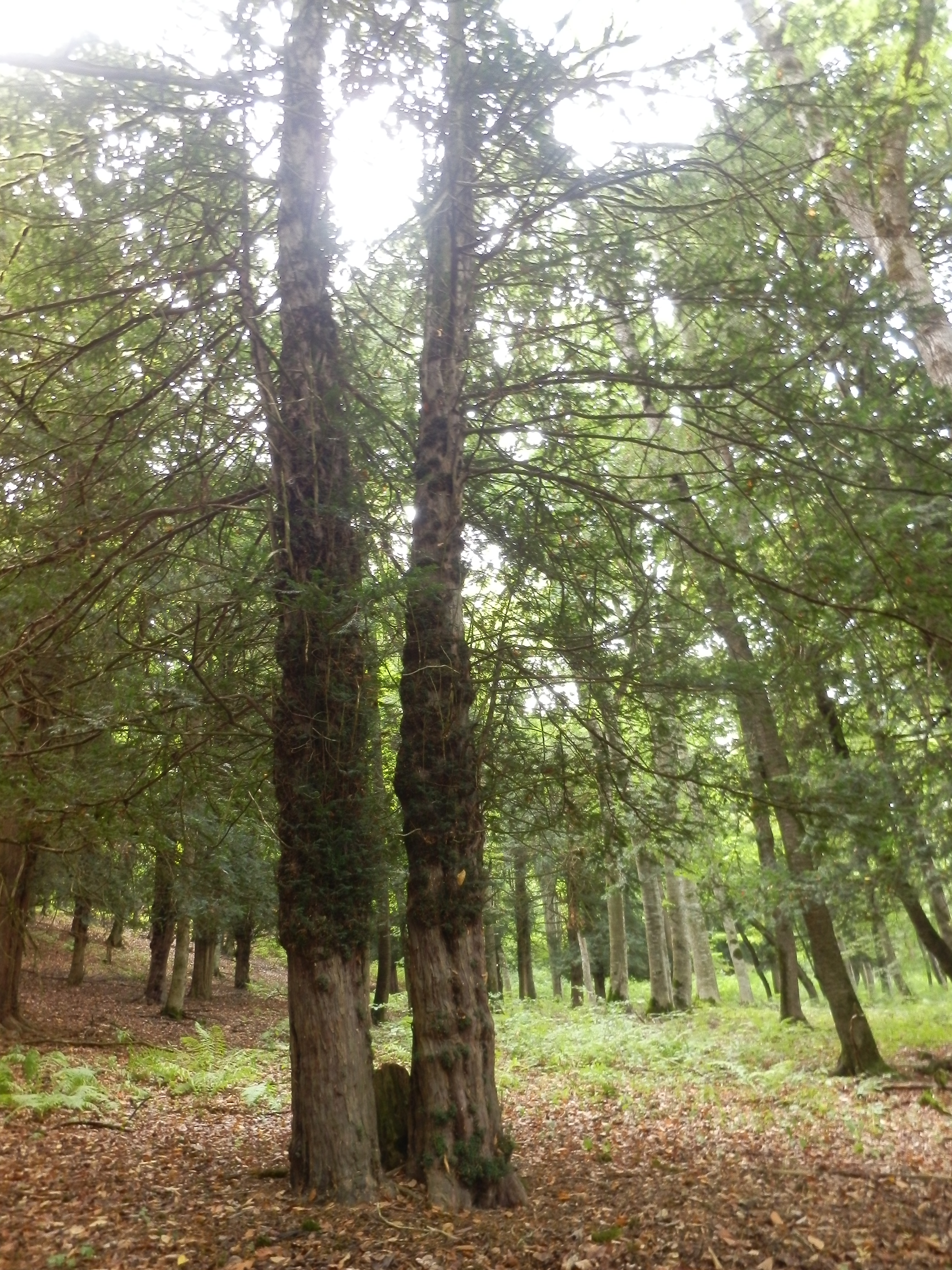
Aghavnavank Yew Grove, Dilijan National Park

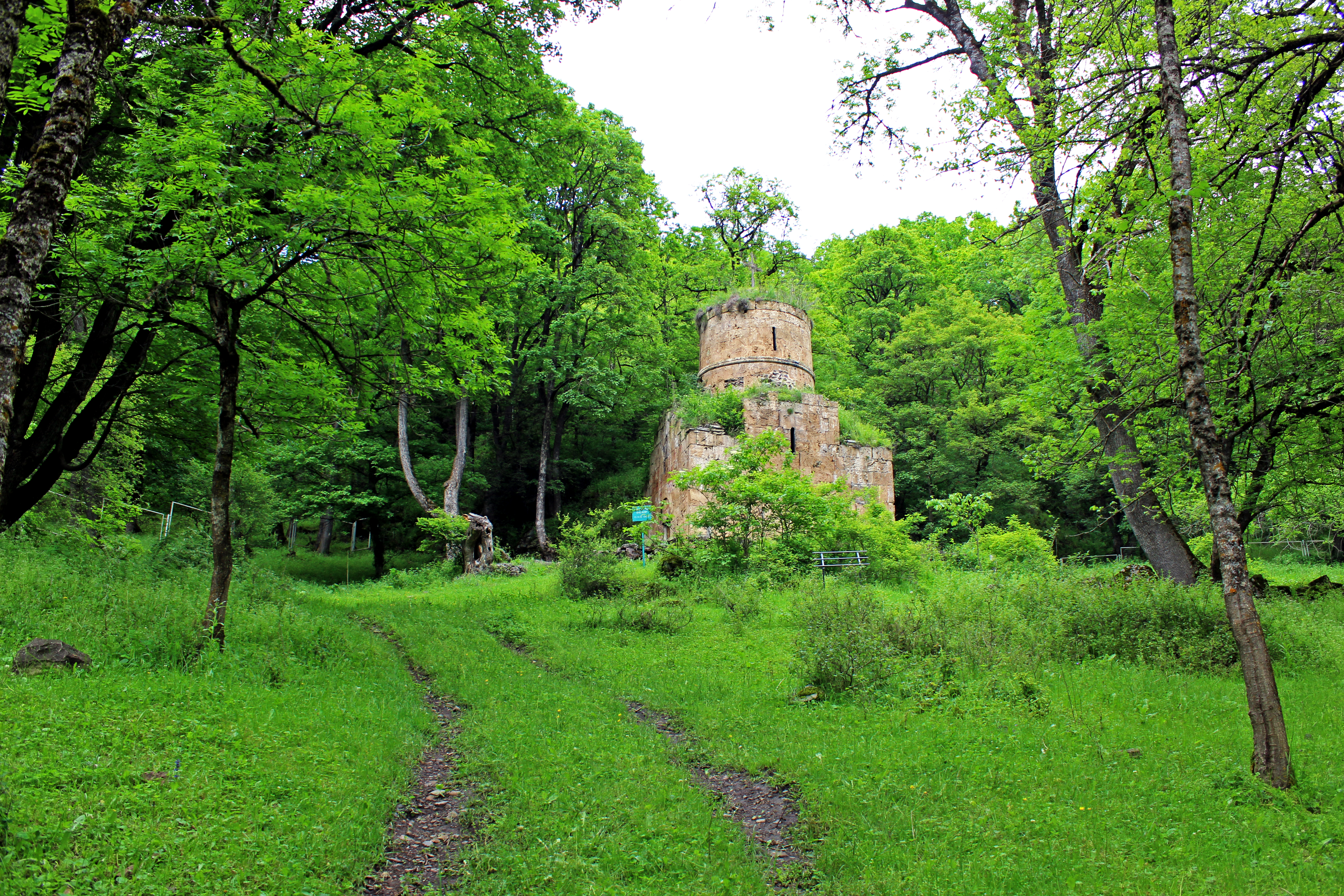
Aghavnavank Monastery

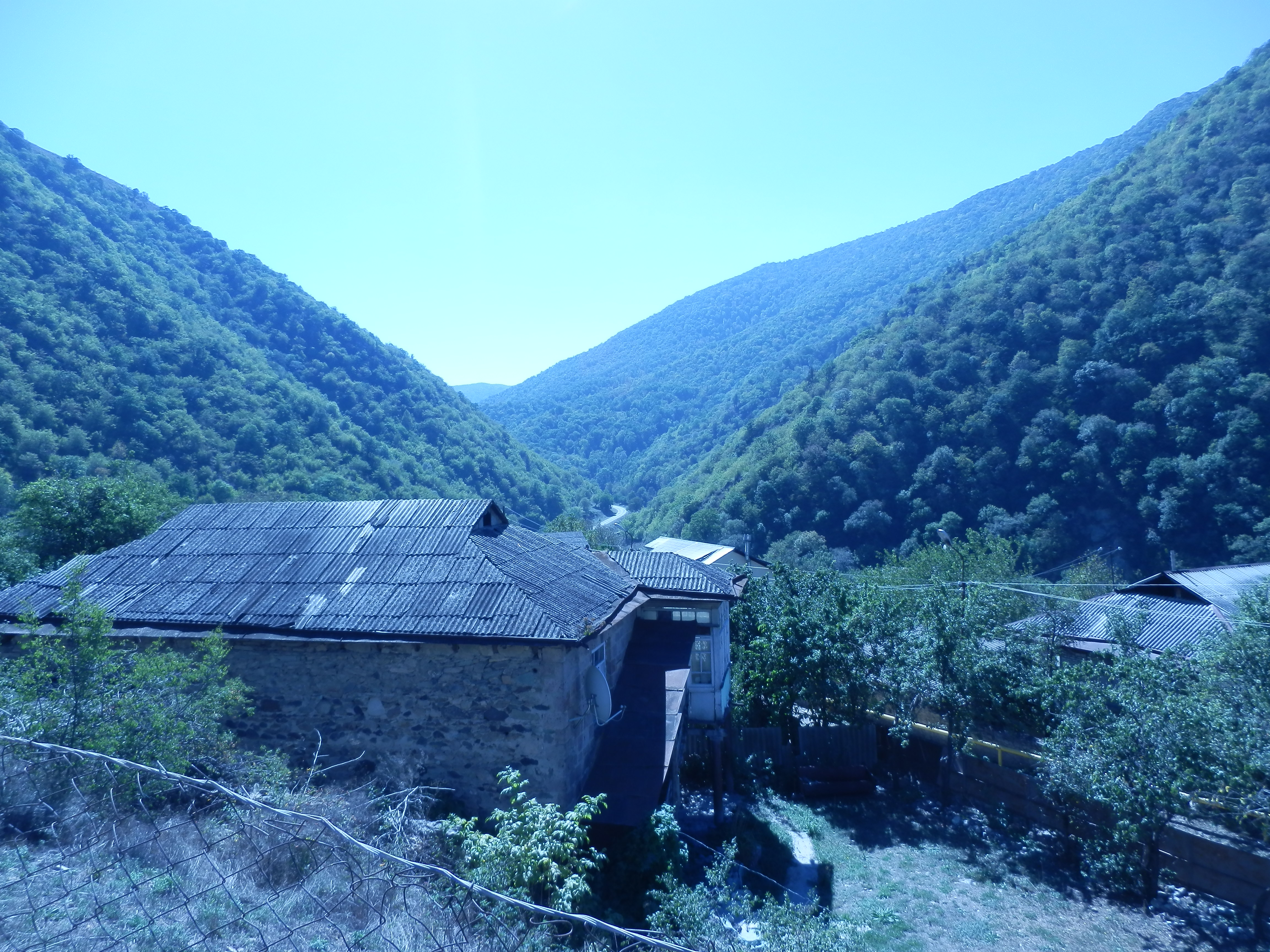
Scenery around Aghavnavank

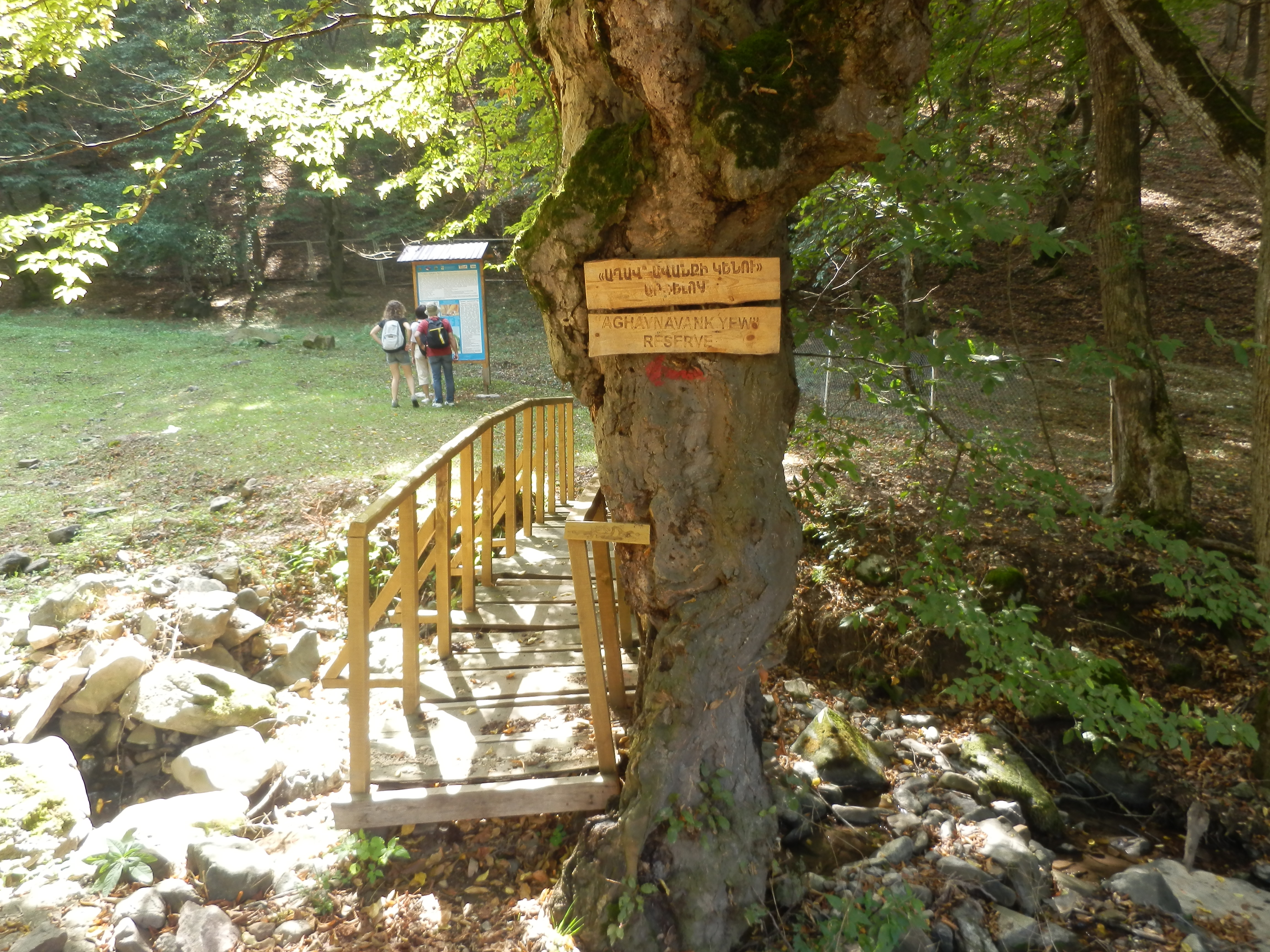
Dilijan National Park Hiking Trail

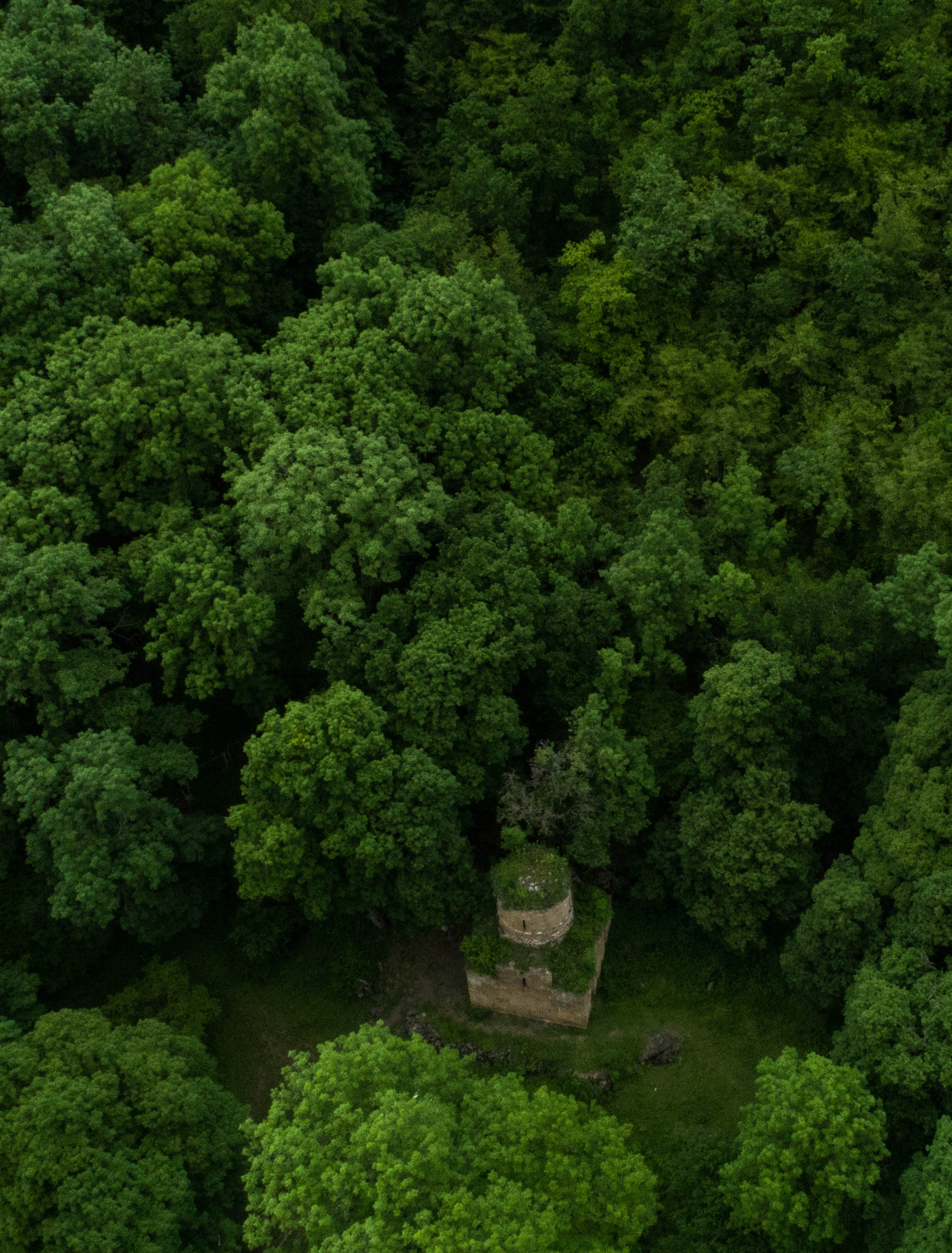
Aerial view of Aghavnavank Monastery
