= Suser =

Suser Սուսեր
- Location within Armenia Location within Aragatsotn
- Coordinates: 40°28′01″N 43°44′00″E
- Country: Armenia
- Province: Aragatsotn
- Municipality: Talin

Population (2011)
  - Total: 268
- Time zone: UTC+4
  - Summer (DST): UTC+5

Suser (Armenian: Սուսեր) is a village in the Talin Municipality of the Aragatsotn Province of Armenia.
