= Davtashen (village) =

Davtashen Դավթաշեն
- Location within Armenia Location within Aragatsotn
- Coordinates: 40°22′N 43°58′E
- Country: Armenia
- Province: Aragatsotn
- Municipality: Talin

Population (2011)
  - Total: 704
- Time zone: UTC+4
  - Summer (DST): UTC+5

Davtashen (Armenian: Դավթաշեն), known as Aylanlu until 1950, is a village in the Talin Municipality of the Aragatsotn Province of Armenia.
