= Tsilkar =

Tsilkar Ծիլքար
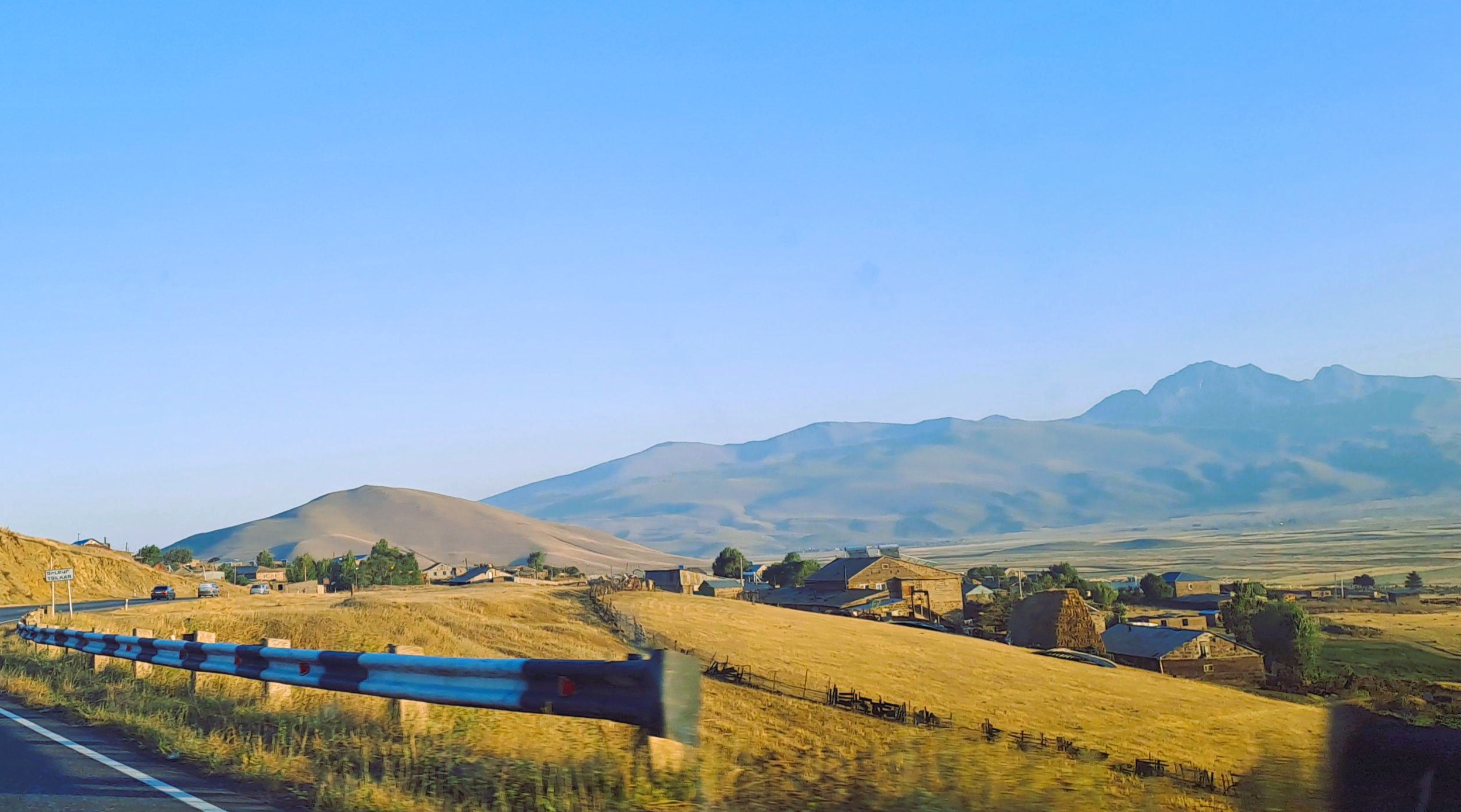
- View of Tsilkar from the main road

- Location within Armenia Location within Aragatsotn
- Coordinates: 40°43′14″N 44°12′30″E
- Country: Armenia
- Province: Aragatsotn
- Municipality: Tsaghkahovit
- Elevation: 2,150 m (7,050 ft)

Population (2011)
  - Total: 554
- Time zone: UTC+4

Tsilkar (Armenian: Ծիլքար) is a village in the Tsaghkahovit Municipality of the Aragatsotn Province of Armenia.
