= Saralanj, Aragatsotn =

Saralanj Սարալանջ
- Location within Armenia Location within Aragatsotn
- Coordinates: 40°36′11″N 44°23′34″E
- Country: Armenia
- Province: Aragatsotn
- Municipality: Aparan

Population (2011)
  - Total: 198
- Time zone: UTC+4
  - Summer (DST): UTC+5

Saralanj (Armenian: Սարալանջ) is a village in the Aparan Municipality of the Aragatsotn Province of Armenia.
