= Ttujur, Aragatsotn =

Ttujur Թթուջուր
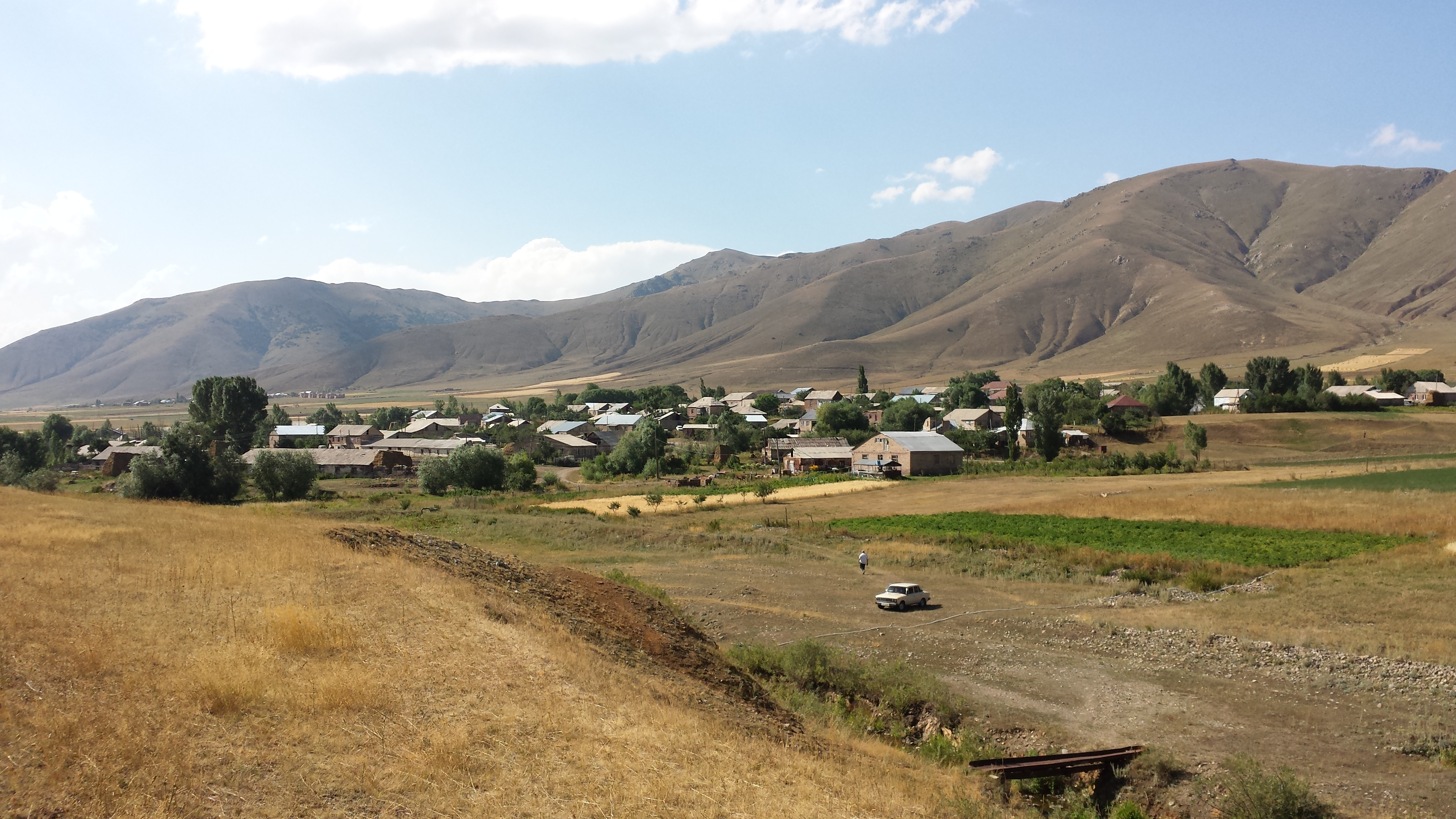
- Ttujur-Aparan

- Location within Armenia Location within Aragatsotn
- Coordinates: 40°34′29″N 44°27′17″E
- Country: Armenia
- Province: Aragatsotn
- Municipality: Aparan
- Elevation: 1,910 m (6,270 ft)

Population (2011)
  - Total: 310
- Time zone: UTC+4
  - Summer (DST): UTC+5

Ttujur (Armenian: Թթուջուր) is a village in the Aparan Municipality of the Aragatsotn Province of Armenia. The village 's church is dedicated to Saint Harutyun. The village also contains a 17th-century shrine called Karmir Vank.
