= Yeghnik =

Yeghnik Եղնիկ
- Location within Armenia Location within Aragatsotn
- Coordinates: 40°24′N 43°57′E
- Country: Armenia
- Province: Aragatsotn
- Municipality: Talin
- Elevation: 1,900 m (6,200 ft)

Population (2011)
  - Total: 336
- Time zone: UTC+4
  - Summer (DST): UTC+5

Yeghnik (Armenian: Եղնիկ), known until 1946 as Dadalu, is a village in the Talin Municipality of the Aragatsotn Province of Armenia. The village's church, Saint Nshan, dates back to 1866.
