= Apnagyugh =

Village in Aragatsotn, Armenia

Apnagyugh Ափնագյուղ
- Location within Armenia Location within Aragatsotn
- Coordinates: 40°26′22″N 44°23′46″E
- Country: Armenia
- Province: Aragatsotn
- Municipality: Aparan

Population (2011)
  - Total: 630
- Time zone: UTC+4
  - Summer (DST): UTC+5

Apnagyugh (Armenian: Ափնագյուղ) is a village in the Aparan Municipality of the Aragatsotn Province of Armenia.
