= Shoghakn =

Shoghakn Շողակն
- Location within Armenia Location within Aragatsotn
- Coordinates: 40°28′10″N 44°28′46″E
- Country: Armenia
- Province: Aragatsotn
- Municipality: Aparan

Population (2011)
  - Total: 167
- Time zone: UTC+4
  - Summer (DST): UTC+5

Shoghakn (Armenian: Շողակն) is a village in the Aparan Municipality of the Aragatsotn Province of Armenia.
