= Nor Amanos =

Nor Amanos Նոր Ամանոս
- Location within Armenia Location within Aragatsotn
- Coordinates: 40°14′03″N 44°04′02″E
- Country: Armenia
- Province: Aragatsotn
- Municipality: Ashtarak

Population (2011)
  - Total: 630
- Time zone: UTC+4
  - Summer (DST): UTC+5

Nor Amanos (Armenian: Նոր Ամանոս) is a village in the Ashtarak Municipality of the Aragatsotn Province of Armenia. It was founded as a sovkhoz (collective farm).
