= Arum, Armenia =

Arum
- Location within Armenia
- Coordinates: 40°17′26″N 44°04′11″E
- Country: Armenia
- Marz (Province): Aragatsotn
- Time zone: UTC+4 ( )

Arum, is an abandoned village in the Aragatsotn Province of Armenia.

== See also ==
- Aragatsotn Province
