= Kyalashbek =

Abandoned village in Aragatsotn, Armenia

- Location within Armenia
- Coordinates: 40°24′N 43°45′E
- Country: Armenia
- Marz (Province): Aragatsotn
- Time zone: UTC+4 ( )

Kyalashbek is an abandoned village in the Aragatsotn Province of Armenia.

== See also ==
- Aragatsotn Province
