= Karmrashen (former village) =

Karmrashen Կարմրաշեն
- Location within Armenia
- Coordinates: 40°16′N 43°53′E
- Country: Armenia
- Marz (Province): Aragatsotn
- Time zone: UTC+4 (AMT)

Karmrashen (Armenian: Կարմրաշեն) is an abandoned village in the southern part of the Aragatsotn Province of Armenia, south of the Ashnak village.

GEOnet Names Server classed it as an Armenian populated place in 1998.

== Names ==
Spelling variations for Karmrashen include:

- Karaburun
- Karmrashen
- Karaburun
- Karmrashen

== Elevation ==
Karmrashen is elevated 1135 meters above sea level.
