= Sergey Movsisyan =

Mohamed Hersi Farah

Governor Aragatsotn Province
- Incumbent
- Assumed office 13 January 2022
- Preceded by: Ashot Simonyan

Member of the National Assembly
- In office 14 January 2019 – 4 January 2022

Personal details
- Born: 23 December 1989 (age 36) Parpi, Ashtarak District, ArSSR, Soviet Union
- Party: Civil Contract
- Education: Yerevan State University

Sergey Movsisyan is an Armenian politician who has been serving as the Governor of Aragatsotn Province since January 13, 2022.

Movsisyan previously served as a Member of the Armenian Parliament from 2018 to 2022.
