= Norashen, Aragatsotn =

Norashen Նորաշեն
- Location within Armenia Location within Aragatsotn
- Coordinates: 40°39′44″N 44°04′25″E
- Country: Armenia
- Province: Aragatsotn
- Municipality: Tsaghkahovit

Population (2011)
  - Total: 1,046
- Time zone: UTC+4
  - Summer (DST): UTC+5

Norashen (Armenian: Նորաշեն) is a village in the Tsaghkahovit Municipality of the Aragatsotn Province of Armenia.
