= Buravet =

Village in Aragatsotn, Armenia

- Location within Armenia
- Coordinates: 40°21′53″N 44°19′39″E
- Country: Armenia
- Marz (Province): Aragatsotn
- Time zone: UTC+4 ( )

Buravet (formerly Persi) is an abandoned settlement in the Aragatsotn Province of Armenia.

== See also ==
- Aragatsotn Province
