= Zovasar =

Village in Aragatsotn, Armenia

Zovasar Զովասար
- Location within Armenia Location within Aragatsotn
- Coordinates: 40°28′28″N 43°57′00″E
- Country: Armenia
- Province: Aragatsotn
- Municipality: Talin
- Elevation: 2,100 m (6,900 ft)

Population (2011)
  - Total: 497
- Time zone: UTC+4
  - Summer (DST): UTC+5

Zovasar (Armenian: Զովասար) is a village in the Talin Municipality of the Aragatsotn Province of Armenia.
