= Kasagh, Aragatsotn =

Village in Aragatsotn, Armenia

Kasagh
- Location within Armenia
- Coordinates: 40°32′N 44°25′E
- Country: Armenia
- Marz (Province): Aragatsotn
- Time zone: UTC+4 ( )

Kasagh (formerly, Chamyrlu and Chamrlu), is an abandoned village in the Aragatsotn Province of Armenia. It was abandoned in 1965 and its ruins now lie beneath the Aparan Reservoir.

After the abandonment of the village, the population was moved to a new village called Kasagh, built at the northwestern suburbs of Yerevan, currently part of the Kotayk Province.
