= Lusakn =

Lusakn Լուսակն
- Location within Armenia Location within Aragatsotn
- Coordinates: 40°18′N 43°50′E
- Country: Armenia
- Province: Aragatsotn
- Municipality: Aragatsavan

Population (2011)
  - Total: 170
- Time zone: UTC+4 (AMT)
  - Summer (DST): UTC+5

Lusakn (Armenian: Լուսակն) is a village in the Aragatsavan Municipality of the Aragatsotn Province of Armenia. The population of the village consists of Armenians and Yezidis.

== Etymology ==
The village was founded in 1983 as "3rd Sovkhoz" (Armenian: 3-րդ Սովխոզ). The village was renamed as Lusakn in 1993.
