= Khnusik =

Khnusik Խնուսիկ
- Location within Armenia Location within Aragatsotn
- Coordinates: 40°20′23″N 44°10′19″E
- Country: Armenia
- Province: Aragatsotn
- Municipality: Ashtarak

Population (2011)
  - Total: 3
- Time zone: UTC+4
  - Summer (DST): UTC+5

Khnusik (Armenian: Խնուսիկ) is a village in the Ashtarak Municipality of the Aragatsotn Province of Armenia. It has hot summers and a humid continental climate.
