= Vardenut =

Vardenut Վարդենուտ
- Location within Armenia Location within Aragatsotn
- Coordinates: 40°28′14″N 44°21′55″E
- Country: Armenia
- Province: Aragatsotn
- Municipality: Aparan
- Settled: 1829
- Elevation: 1,900 m (6,200 ft)

Population (2011)
  - Total: 895
- Time zone: UTC+4
  - Summer (DST): UTC+5

Vardenut (Armenian: Վարդենուտ) is a village in the Aparan Municipality of the Aragatsotn Province of Armenia.
