= Tsamakasar =

Tsamakasar Ցամաքասար
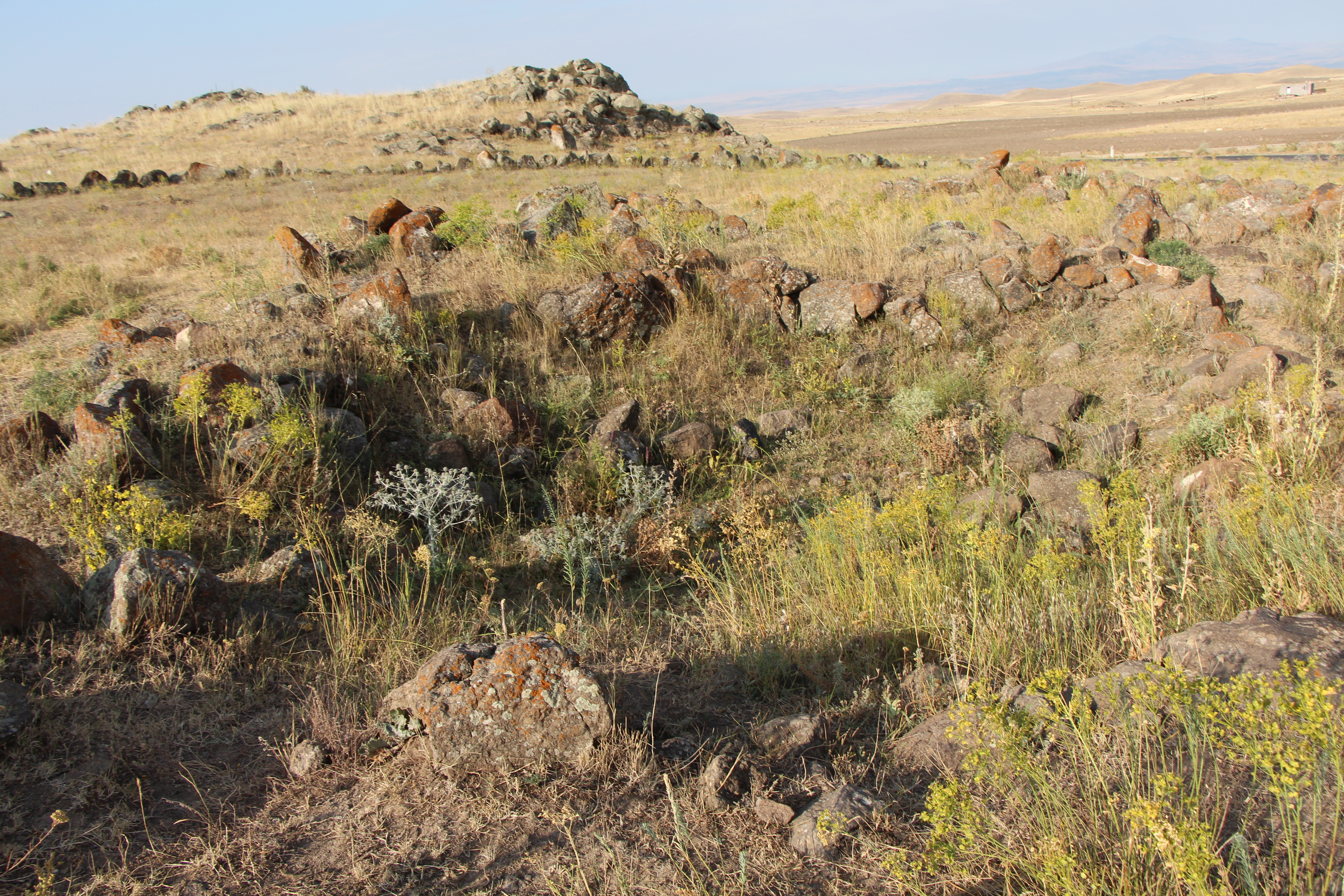
- Ցամաքասար ԳՅՈՒՂԱՏԵՂԻ

- Location within Armenia Location within Aragatsotn
- Coordinates: 40°27′59″N 43°45′22″E
- Country: Armenia
- Province: Aragatsotn
- Municipality: Talin
- Elevation: 1,610 m (5,280 ft)

Population (2011)
  - Total: 430
- Time zone: UTC+4
  - Summer (DST): UTC+5

Tsamakasar (Armenian: Ցամաքասար) is a village in the Talin Municipality of the Aragatsotn Province of Armenia. The town is the site of Bronze Age burials being excavated.
