= Aragatsotn Province =

Province of Armenia

Aragatzotn Արագածոտն
- Province
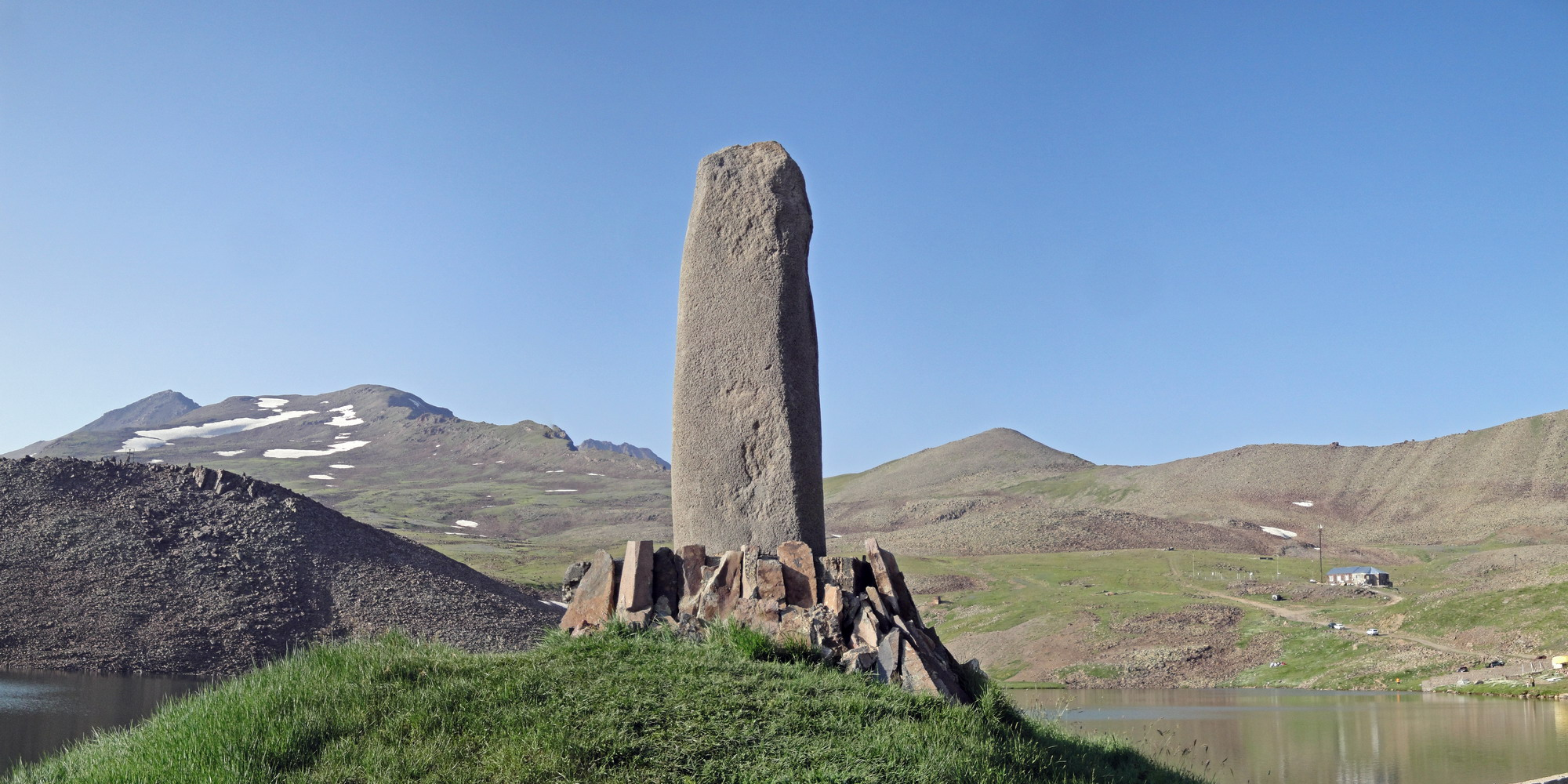
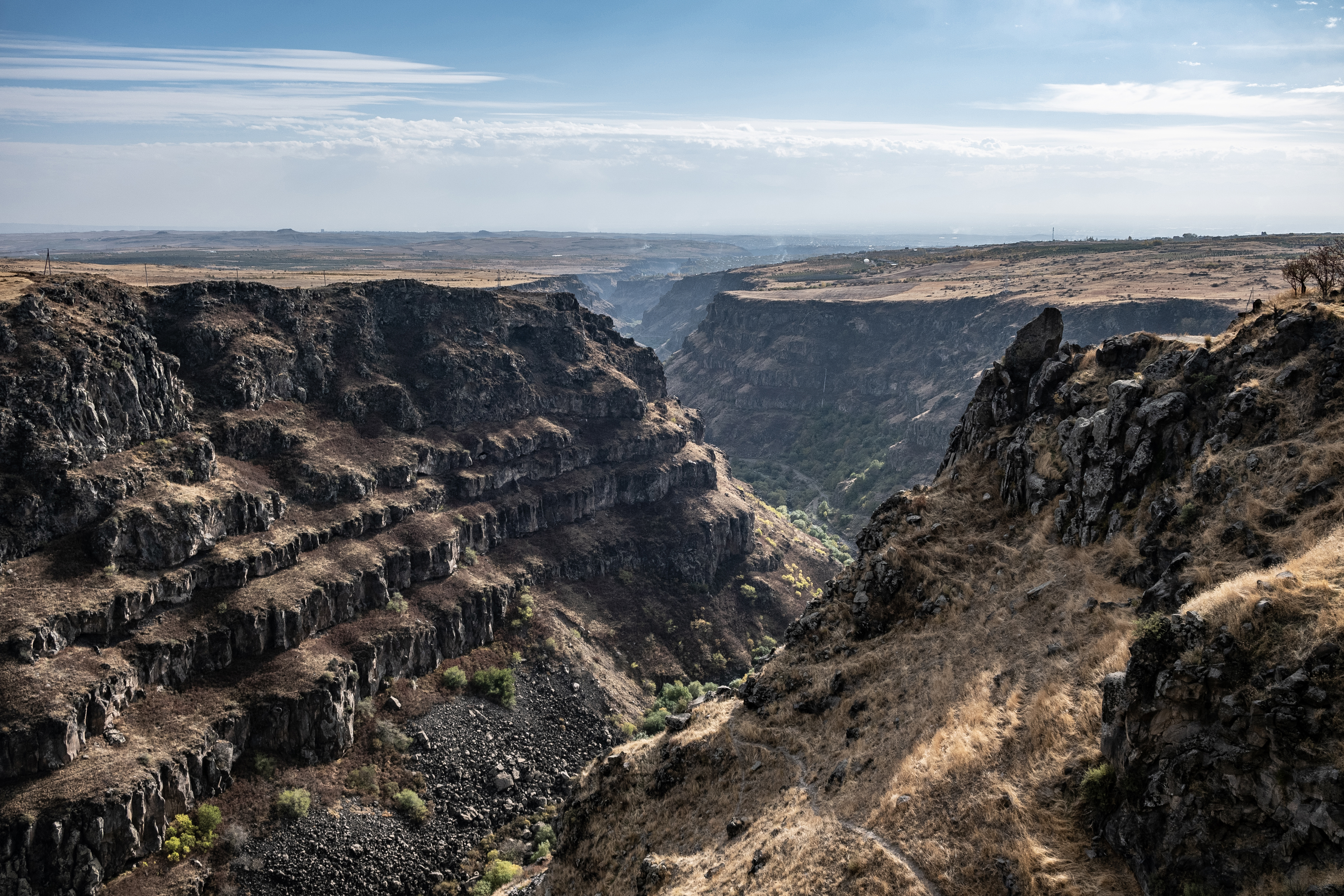
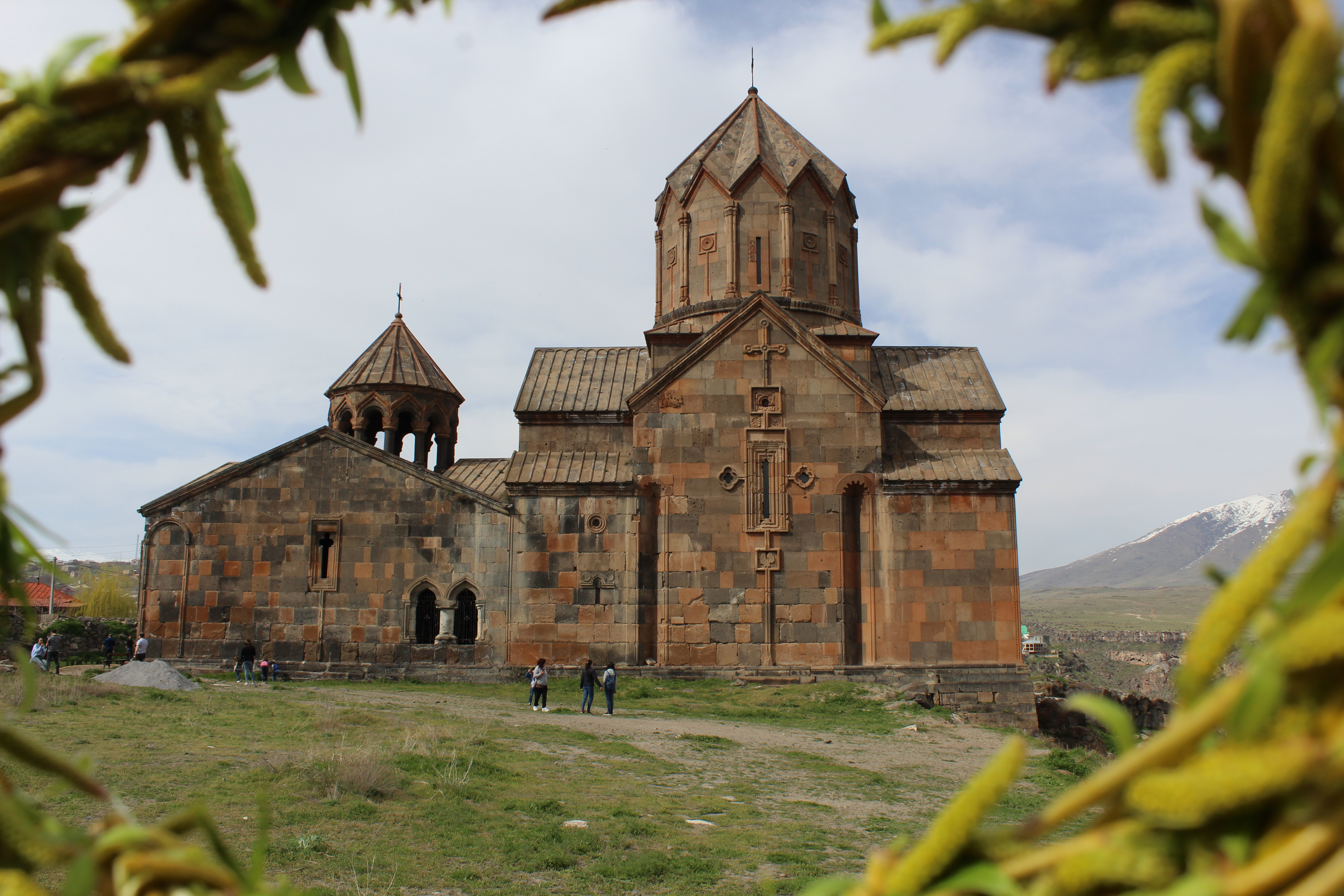
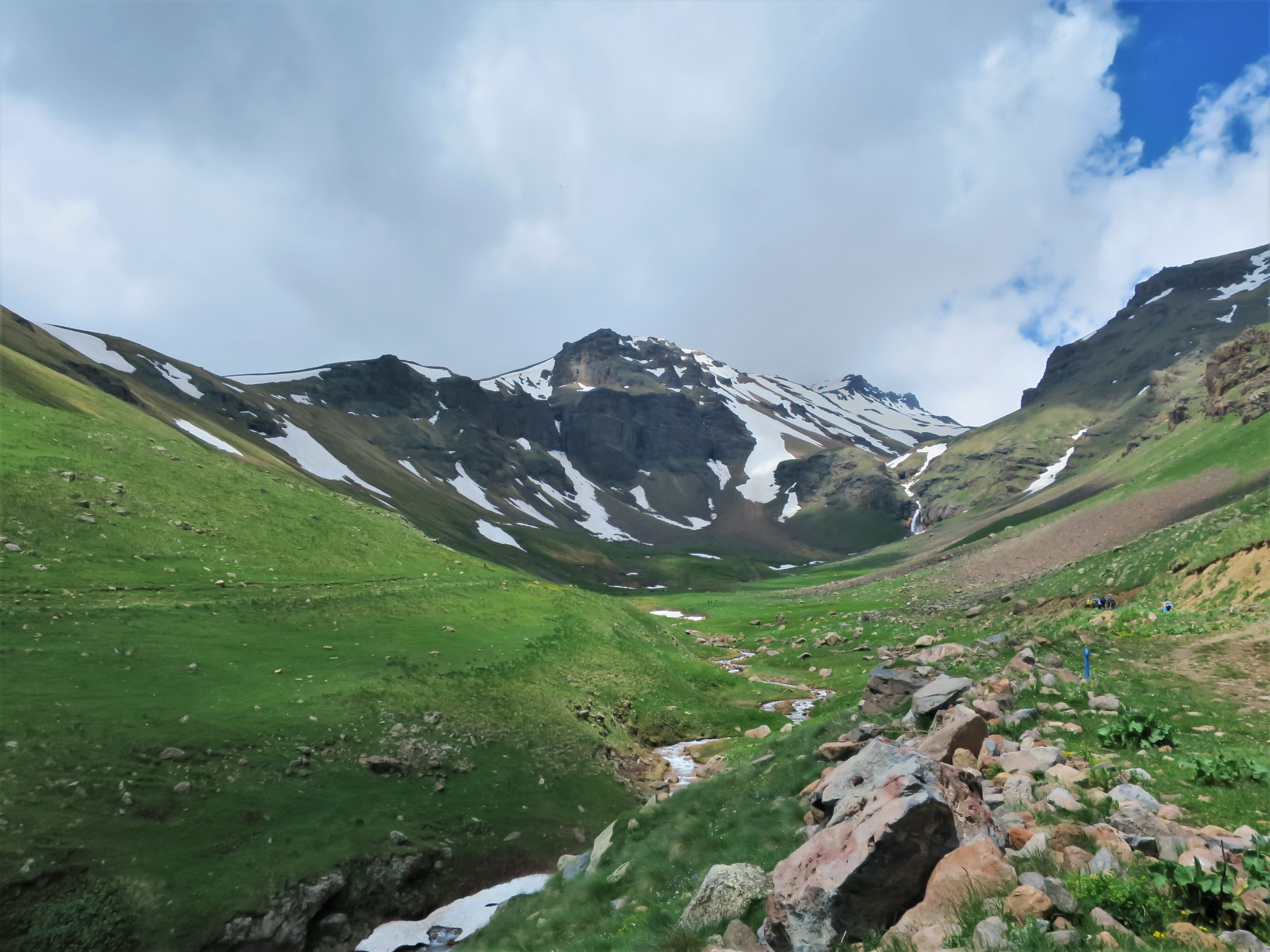
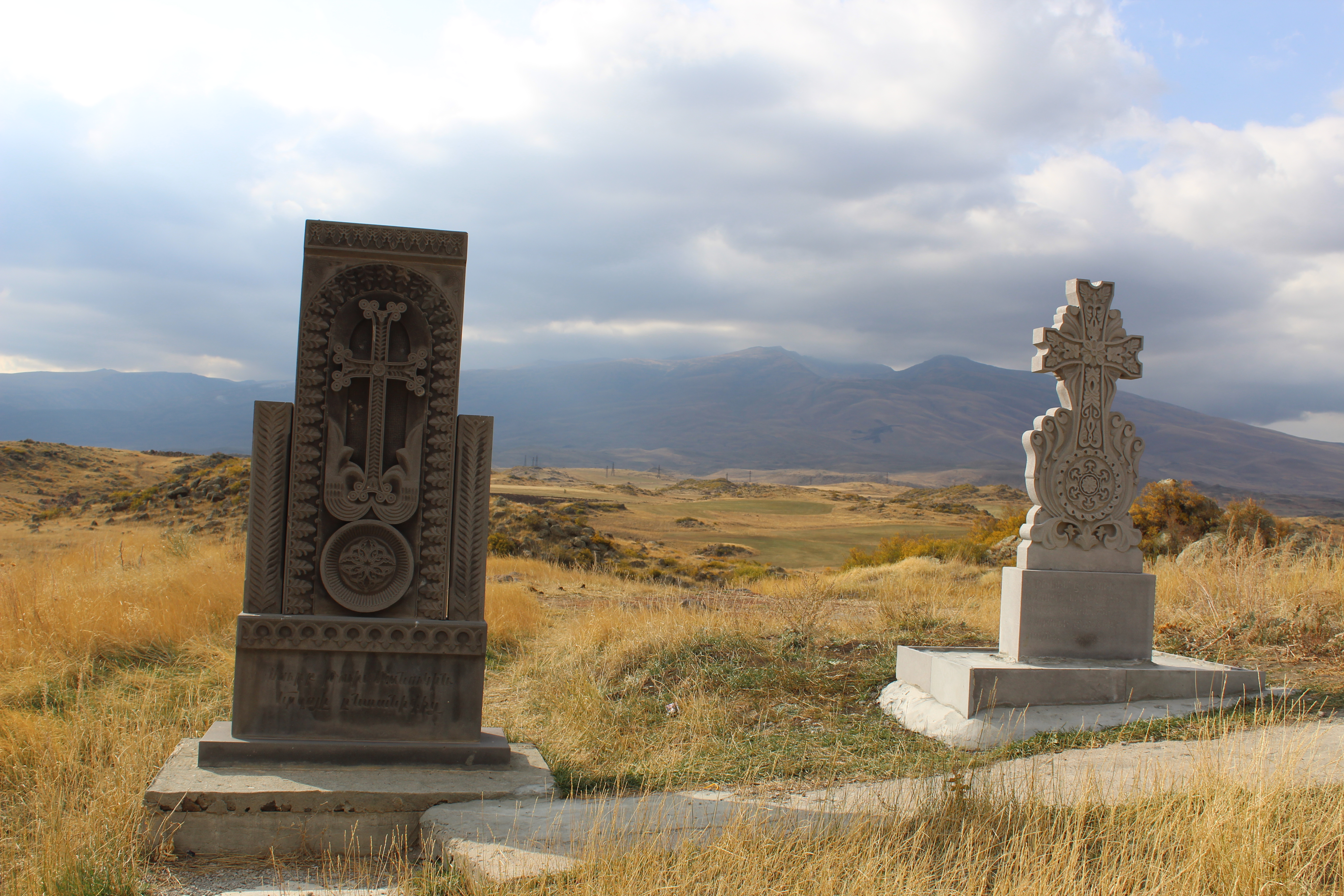
- From the top to bottom-right: A Vishap Stone near Lake Kari, Kasakh Gorge, Hovhannavank Monastery, Mount Aragats Alpine Sanctuary, Khachkars in Aragatsotn Province

- Location of Aragatzotn within Armenia
- Coordinates: 40°25′N 44°10′E
- Country: Armenia
- Capital and largest city: Ashtarak

Government
  - Governor: Sergey Movsisyan

Area
  - Total: 2,773 km^{2} (1,071 sq mi)
  - Rank: 4th

Population (2022)
  - Total: 128,941
  - Rank: 8th
  - Density: 46.50/km^{2} (120.4/sq mi)

GDP
  - Total: ֏ 175.229 billion (US$ 363 million)
  - Per capita: ֏ 1,371,121 (US$ 2,842)
- Time zone: AMT (UTC+04)
- Postal code: 0201-0514
- ISO 3166 code: AM.AG
- FIPS 10-4: AM01
- HDI (2022): 0.770 high · 7th
- Website: Official website

Aragatsotn (Armenian: Արագածոտն, Armenian pronunciation: [ɑɾɑɡɑˈt͡sɔtən]) is a province (marz) of Armenia. It is located in the western part of the country. The capital and largest city of the province is the town of Ashtarak. The Statistical Committee of Armenia reported its population was 128,941 in the 2022 census.

== Etymology ==
Literally meaning "the foot of Aragats" (the highest mountain of Armenia), it is named after the Aragatsotn canton of the historic Ayrarat province of Ancient Armenia, ruled by the Amatuni noble family under the reign of the Arsacid dynasty.

== Geography ==
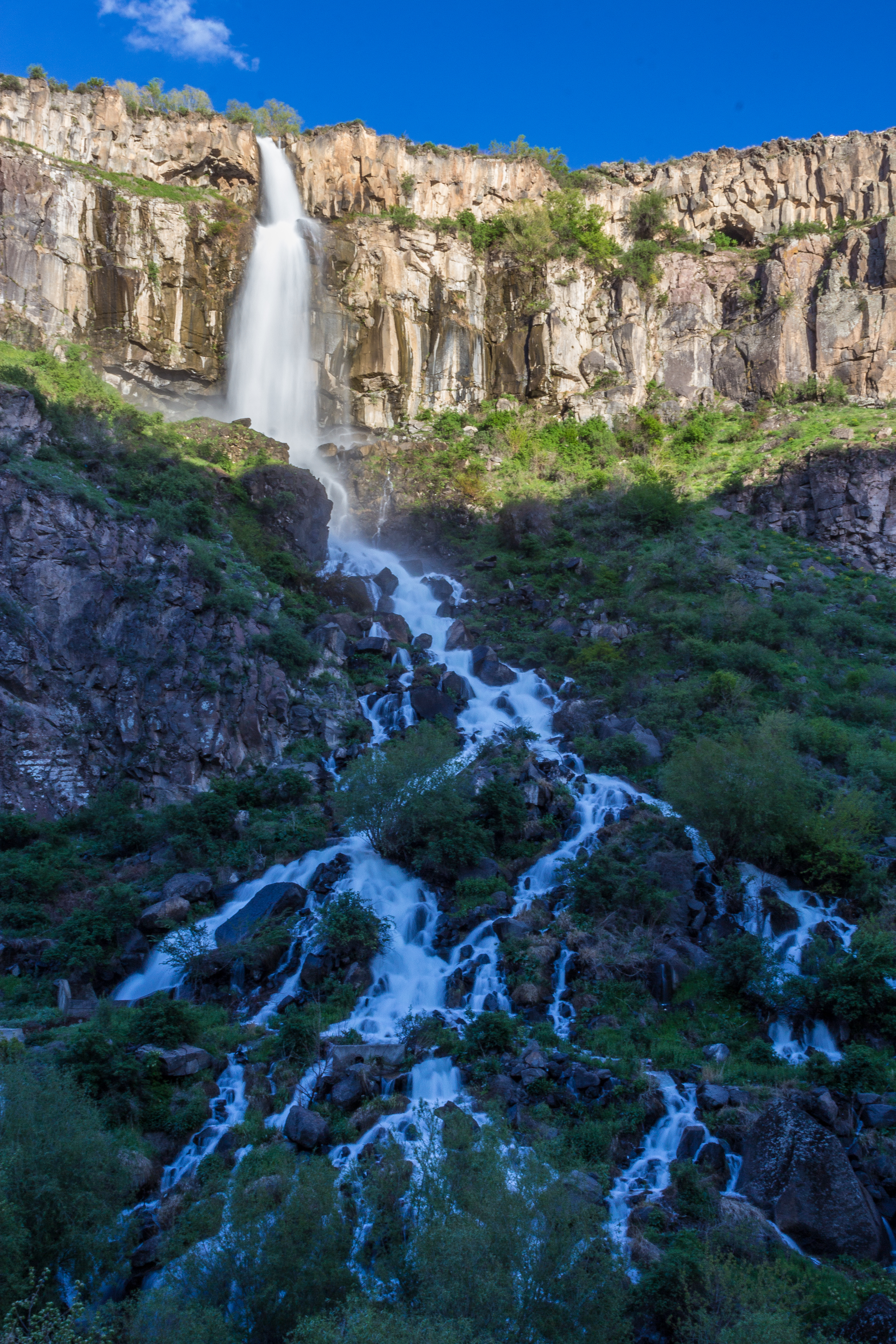
Gegharot waterfall near the village of Aragats

Aragatsotn Province occupies the northwestern part of Armenia and covers an area of 2,756 km^{2} (9.3% of the total area of Armenia). It has internal borders with Shirak Province from the north, Lori Province from the northeast, Kotayk Province from the east, Armavir Province from the south and the city of Yerevan from the southwest. The Akhurian River at the west separates Aragatsotn from the Kars Province of Turkey.

Historically, the current territory of the province mainly occupies parts of Aragatsotn, Nig and Shirak cantons of Ayrarat province of Ancient Armenia.

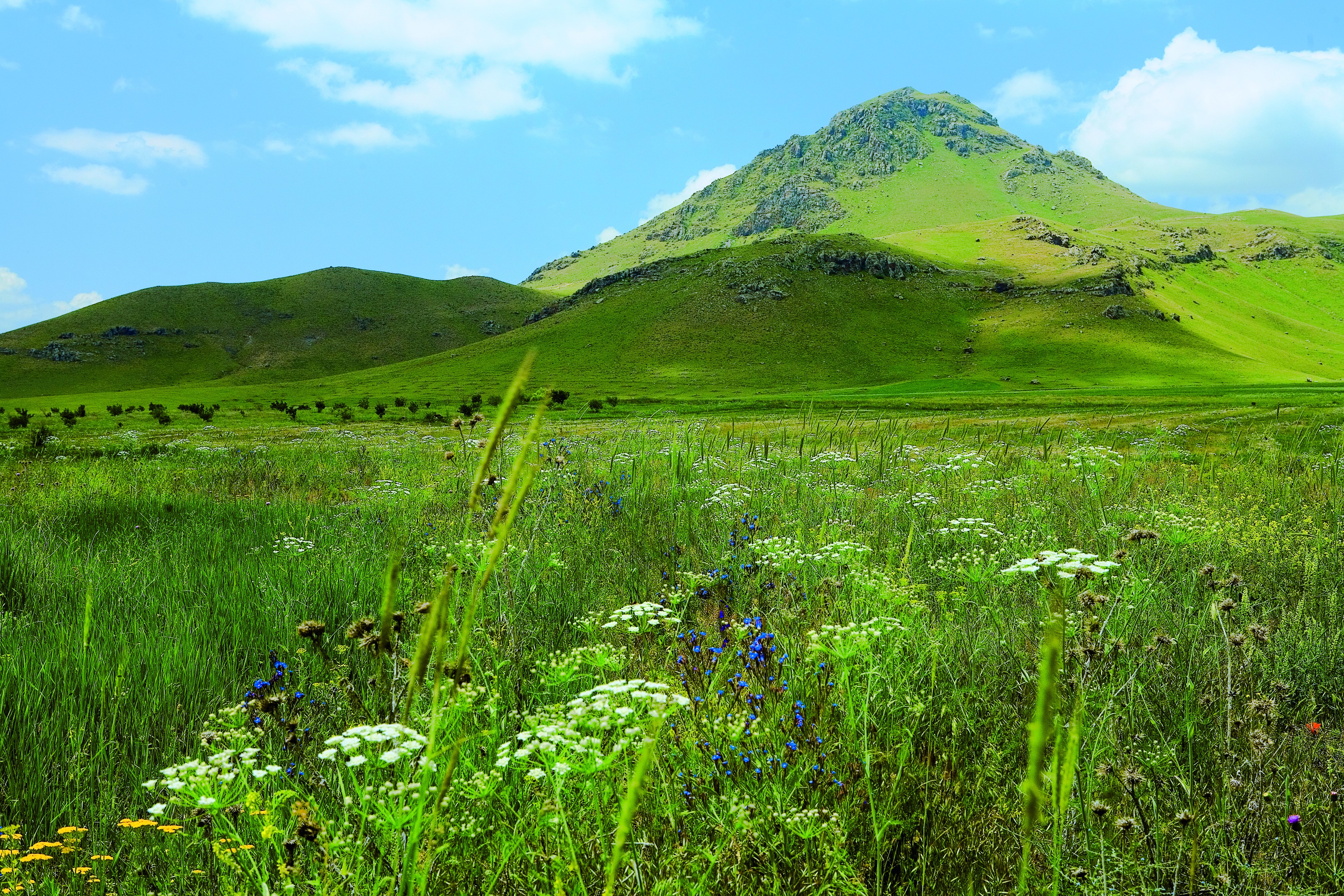
Arteni mountains (2047 m.)

The northern part of the province is dominated by the Aragats mountain range. At the northeast and the east, it approximates the mountains of Pambak and Tsaghkunyats, respectively. The mountains of Arteni dominate the northeastern and the central eastern parts of the province. The tiny Akhurian valley occupies the eastern edge of Aragatsotn. Aragatsotn occupies the northwestern parts of the Ararat plain in the south and the southeast.

The altitude of the province ranges between 950 and 4,090 meters above sea level.

Mount Aragats (4,090 m.) is the highest peak of Aragatsotn and Armenia.

Besides the Akhurian river, the rivers of Kasagh, Gegharot, and Amberd are the main water resources in the province. Mountainous lakes including Lake Kari, Lessing, Amberd, Tagavor, and Kuraghbyur are found on Mount Aragats. Between 1962 and 1967, the Aparan reservoir was built on the Kasagh river.

The climate of Aragatsotn is deeply diversified due to the wide range of altitudes of the region. The annual precipitation level ranges between 400 mm (16 in) at the lower areas and 1,000 mm (39 in) at the mountainous territories.

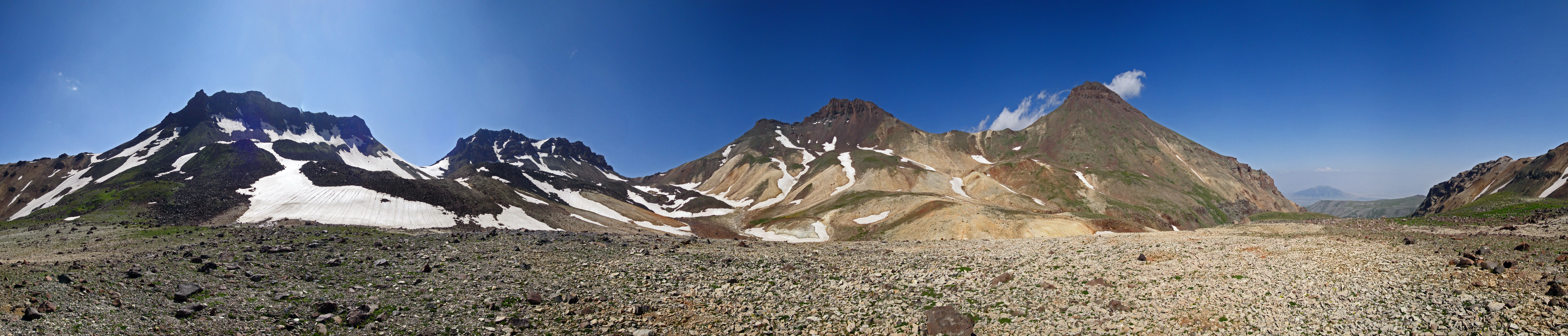
The mountains of Aragats

== History ==
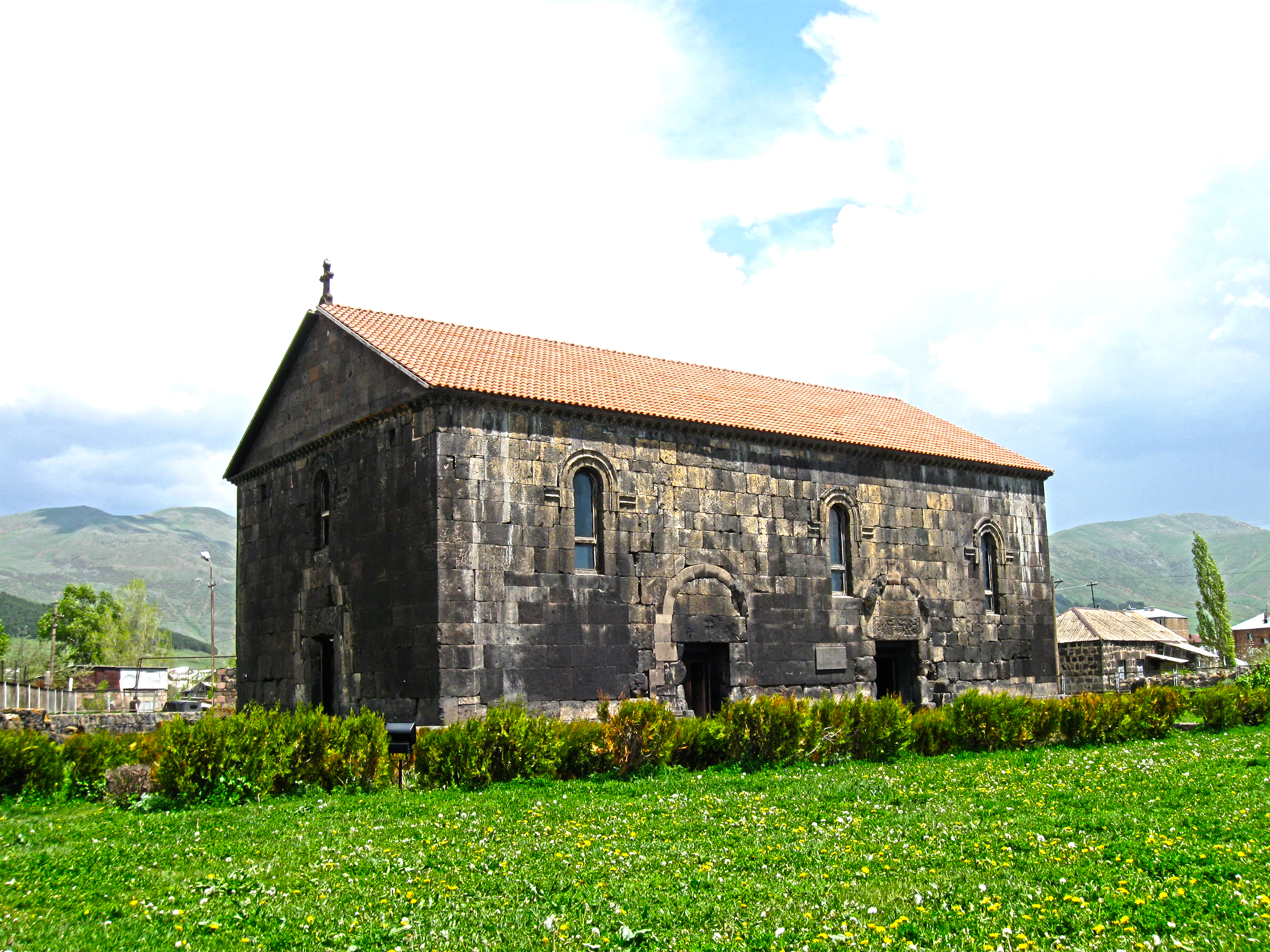
The Holy Cross Basilica of Kasagh of the 4th century

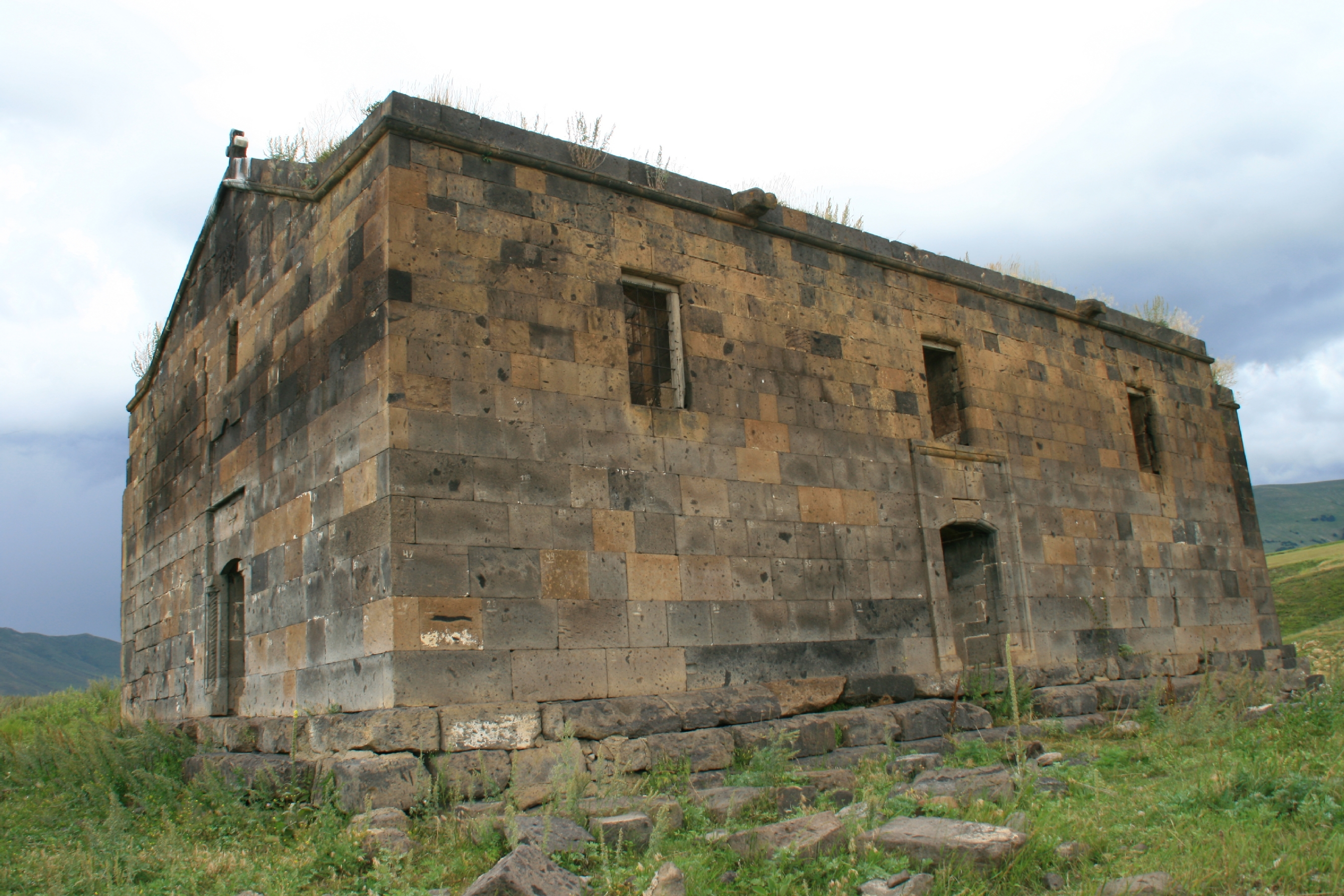
The ruins of the Saint Paul and Peter Church of Zovuni, dating back to the 4th and 5th centuries

According to Movses Khorenatsi, Aramaniak -the son of the patriarch and founder of the Armenian nation Hayk- along with his clan, settled in the area of modern-day Aragatsotn. The cemeteries of Verin Naver archaeological site -located 3 km west of Ashtarak- date back to the 24th and 14th centuries BC.

Being situated at the heart of the Ayrarat province at the centre of the Armenian Highland, Aragatsotn was among the most strategic regions in the history of Armenia, especially since the establishment of the Kingdom of Armenia in 331 BC by the Orontid dynasty. Later in 190 BC, the Artaxiad dynasty took over the reign of the Armenian Kingdom. During the 2nd century AD, the towns of Casala (the Hellenized version of Kasagh, now Aparan), and Talina (now Talin) were mentioned by Ptolemy during the reign of the Arsacid dynasty of Armenia. The territory of Nig canton, including the area of Aparan, was under the administration of the Gntunyan Armenian noble family, while the territory of Aragatsotn canton, including the area of Ashtarak, was ruled by the Amatuni noble family.

Following the partition of Armenia by the Byzantine Empire and Sassanid Persia in 387 and in 428, Eastern Armenia including Aragatsotn became under the rule of Sassanid Persia. The 4th-century Holly Cross Basilica of Kasagh located at the outskirts of modern-day Aparan, is among the earliest surviving samples of the Armenian church architecture.

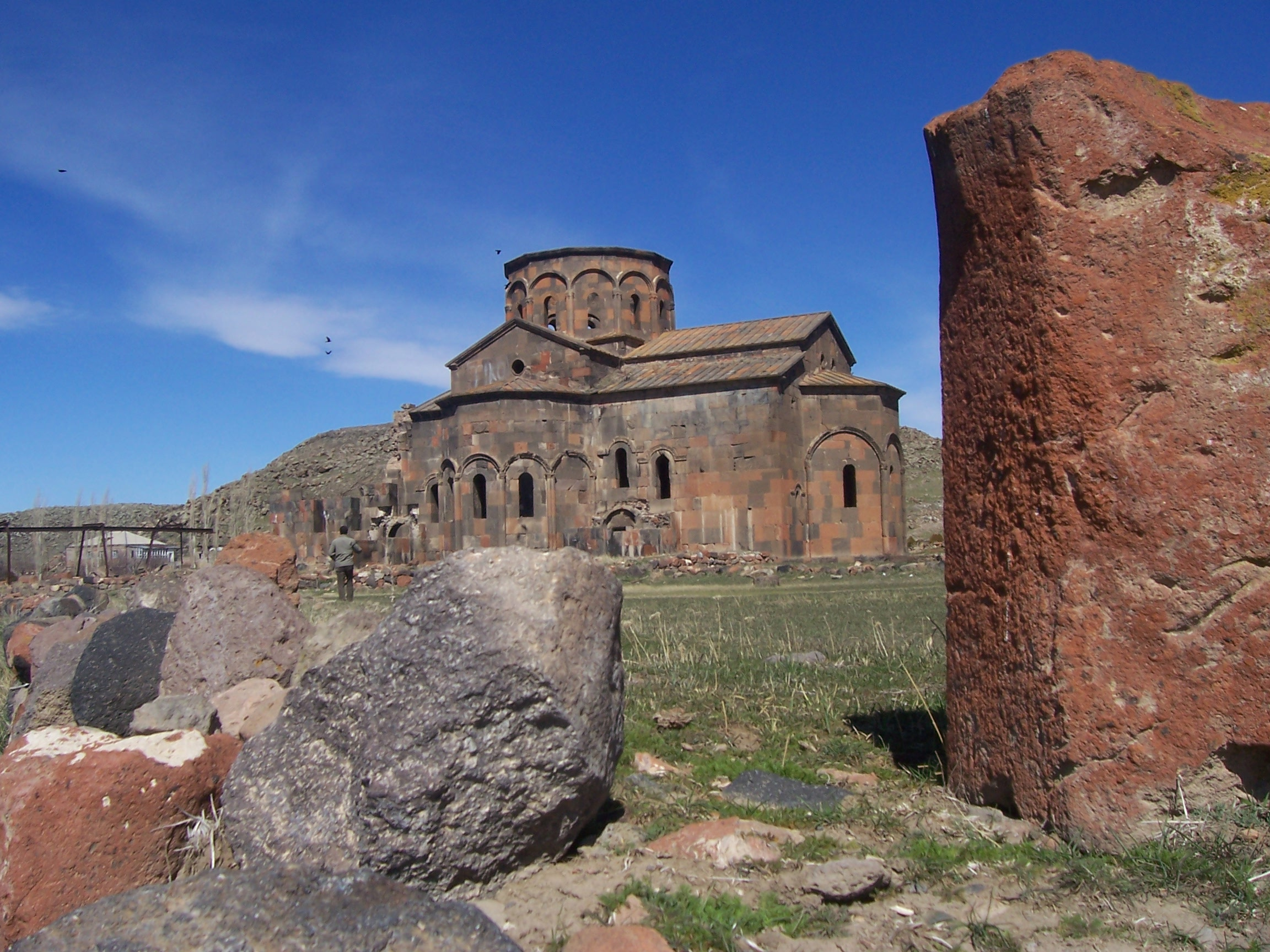
Cathedral of Talin, 7th century

In 658, Armenia was conquered by the Arab invaders. At the end of the 9th century, Aragatsotn became part of the newly established Bagratid Kingdom of Armenia. The Armenian noble families of Kamsarakan and Pahlavuni ruled over Aragatsotn under the Bagratid kings.

However, between the 11th and 15th centuries, Aragatsotn along with the rest of the historic territories of Armenia suffered from the Seljuk, Mongol, Ag Qoyunlu and Kara Koyunlu invasions, respectively. At the beginning of the 16th century, Aragatsotn became part of the Erivan Beglarbegi within the Safavid Persia. During the first half of the 18th century, Aragatsotn became part of the Erivan Khanate under the rule of the Afsharid dynasty and later under the Qajar dynasty of Persia. It remained under the Persian rule until 1827–1828, when Eastern Armenia was ceded to the Russian Empire as a result of the Russo-Persian War of 1826–28 and the signing of the Treaty of Turkmenchay.

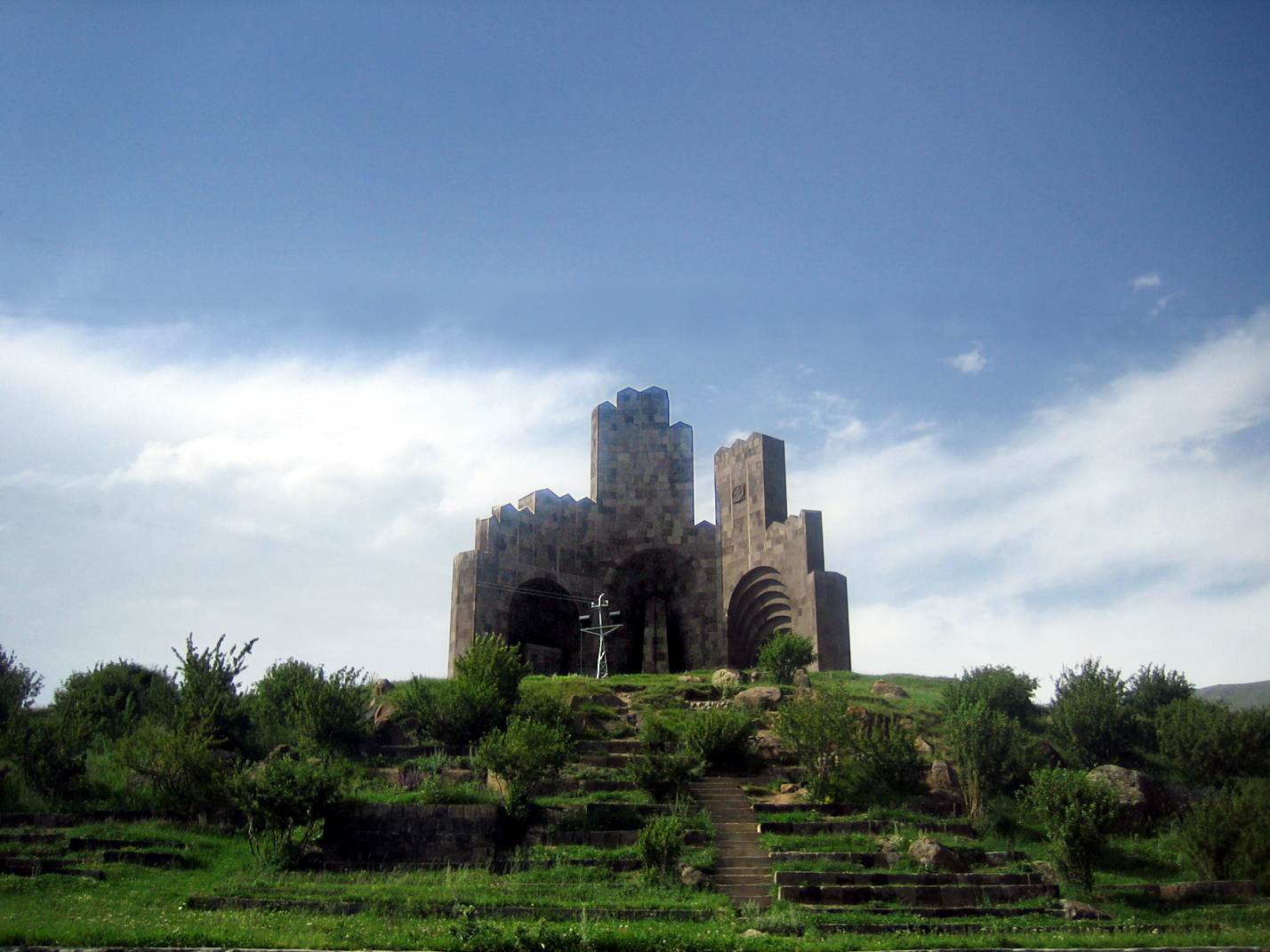
Abaran battle memorial

After the fall of the Russian Empire in 1917, the Armenian, Georgian and Muslim leaders of Transcaucasia united to form the Transcaucasian Federative Republic and proclaimed Transcaucasia's secession. However, it was a fragile short-lived federation that collapsed in May 1918, while the Turkish army was advancing towards Eastern Armenia through Gyumri, Aragatsotn, and Sardarapat. On May 21, 1918, the Turkish forces attacked through Aparan in Aragatsotn trying to reach Yerevan. The Turks were opposed by the Armenian forces under the command of Dro at the outskirts of Aparan. After three days of fierce fighting, the Armenians launched a counter-attack on 25 May, and the Turkish troops were forced to retreat back to the north on 29 May. As a result of the decisive victories over the Turks in the battles of Sardarabad, Abaran, and Gharakilisa, the Armenians declared independence on May 28, 1918.

After 2 years of brief independence, Armenia became part of the Soviet Union in December 1920. From 1930 until 1995, modern-day Aragatsotn was divided into 3 raions within the Armenian SSR: Talin raion, Aparan raion, and Ashtarak raion. With the territorial administration reform of 1995, the 3 raions were merged to form the Aragatsotn Province.

== Demographics ==
=== Population ===
According to the 1989 Soviet census, the Aragatsotn Province (then part of the Aparan, Aragats, Ashtarak, and Talin districts in 1930–1995) had a population of 141,611. 24,277 or 17.14% of which was urban, distributed in the city of Ashtarak, and 117,334 or 82.86% were rural, distributed in the districts of Aparan (21,654), Aragats (13,401), Ashtarak (42,701), and Talin (39,578).

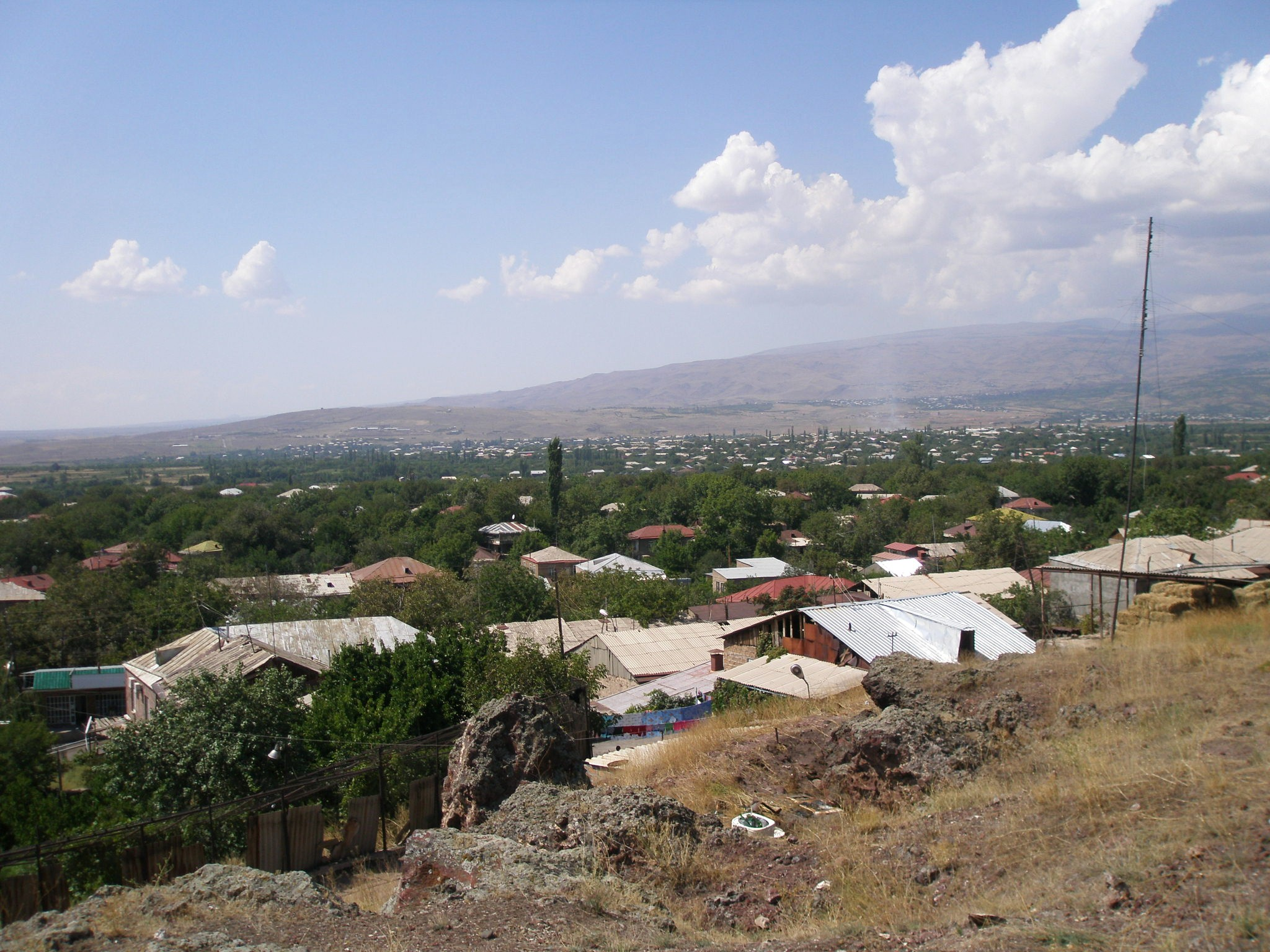
Oshakan, the largest village in Aragatsotn

According to the 2011 official census, Aragatsotn has a population of 132,925 (66,738 men and 66,187 women), forming around 4.4% of the entire population of Armenia. The urban population is 31,376 (23.6%) and the rural is 101,549 (76.4%). Aragatsotn has the highest percentage of rural population in Armenia.

The province has 3 urban and 111 rural communities. The largest urban community is the provincial centre of Ashtarak, with a population of 19,615. The other urban centres of Aparan and Talin have a population of 6,451 and 5,310 respectively.

With a population of 4,780, the village of Oshakan is the largest rural municipality of Aragatsotn.

=== Ethnic groups and religion ===
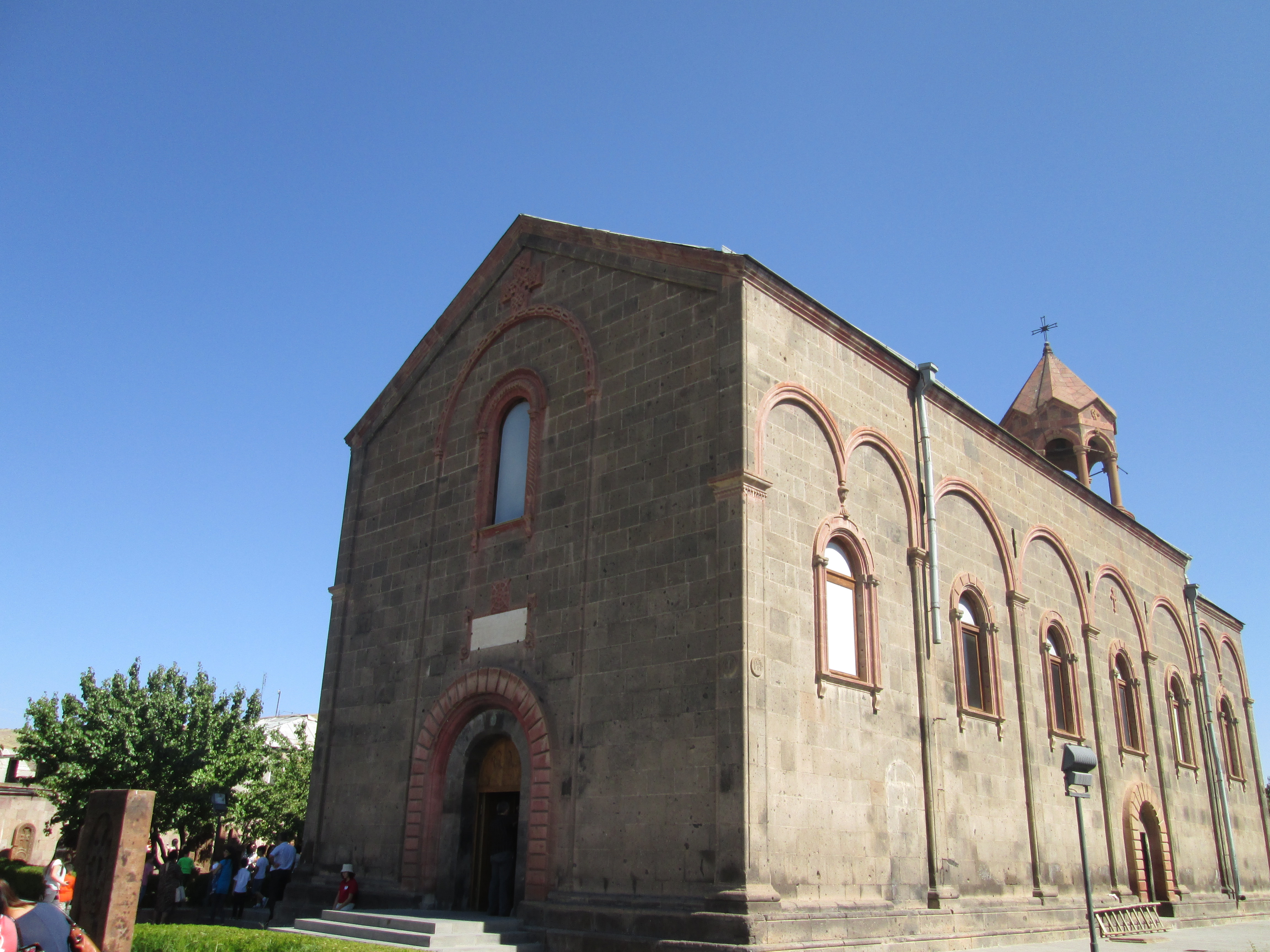
Saint Mesrop Mashtots Church

The province is primarily inhabited by Armenians who migrated from Moush, Manzikert, Sasun, Kars, Khoy, and Alashkert in the 19th and 20th centuries as well as a minority of Armeno-Tat who belong to the Armenian Apostolic Church. The regulating body of the church is the Diocese of Aragatsotn, headed by Bishop Mkrtich Broshyan. The Saint Mesrop Mashtots Church of Oshakan of is the seat of the diocese.

There is also a significant presence of Yazidis in the province. The 20 following villages of Aragatsotn are almost entirely populated by Yazidis: Alagyaz, Arevut, Avshen, Charchakis, Ddmasar, Hako, Jamshlu, Kanch, Kaniashir, Metsadzor, Mijnatun, Mirak, Otevan, Rya Taza, Sadunts, Shamiram, Shenkani, Sipan, Sorik and Tlik. The villages of Arteni, Oshakan, Vardenut and Voskevaz have a significant Yazidi population as well. Yazidis are also found in the towns of Aparan and Talin.

The village of Alagyaz is also home to a small number of Kurds.

== Administrative divisions ==
As a result of the administrative reforms completed during 2019, Aragatsotn is currently divided into 9 municipal communities (hamaynkner), of which 3 are urban and 6 are rural:

- A cross denotes a town (urban settlement), otherwise, the settlements are villages (rural settlements).

Municipality	Area (km^{2})	Population (2022 census)	Centre	Settlements
Alagyaz		3,465	Alagyaz	Avshen, Charchakis, Jamshlu, Kaniashir, Mijnatun, Mirak, Rya Taza, Sadunts, Shenkani, Sipan
Aparan		20,938	Aparan†	Aragats, Arayi, Apnagyugh, Chknagh, Dzoraglukh, Hartavan, Jrambar, Kayk, Kuchak, Lusagyugh, Melikgyugh, Nigavan, Saralanj, Vardenis, Vardenut, Shenavan, Shoghakn, Tsaghkashen, Ttujur, Yernjatap, Yeghipatrush
Aragatsavan			Aragatsavan	Arteni, Getap, Lusakn
Arevut		791	Arevut	Ddmasar, Hako, Kanch, Sorik, Tlik
Ashtarak		61,859	Ashtarak†	Agarak, Aghdzk, Antarut, Aragatsotn, Artashavan, Aruch, Avan, Bazmaghbyur, Byurakan, Dprevank, Ghazaravan, Karbi, Karin, Khnusik, Kosh, Lernarot, Mughni, Nor Amanos, Nor Yedesia, Nor Yerznka, Ohanavan, Orgov, Oshakan, Parpi, Sasunik, Saghmosavan, Tegher, Ujan, Ushi Verin Sasunik, Voskehat, Voskevaz
Metsadzor		264	Metsadzor	Otevan
Shamiram	21.2	1,364	Shamiram	
Talin		30,867	Talin†	Agarakavan, Akunk, Ashnak, Garnahovit, Dashtadem, Davtashen, Dian, Dzoragyugh, Hatsashen, Irind, Kakavadzor, Karmrashen, Katnaghbyur, Mastara, Nerkin Bazmaberd, Nerkin Sasnashen, Nor Artik, Partizak, Shgharshik, Suser, Verin Bazmaberd, Verin Sasnashen, Vosketas, Tsamakasar Yeghnik, Zarinja, Zovasar
Tsaghkahovit		9,393	Tsaghkahovit	Berkarat, Geghadir, Geghadzor, Gegharot, Hnaberd, Lernapar, Norashen, Tsilkar, Vardablur

Many villages in Aragatsotn are currently abandoned or uninhabited, including Arum, Buravet, Karmrashen, Kasagh, Kyalashbek, Lusaghbyur, Nigatun, Shenik, Verin Kalakut and Zovuni.

== Culture ==
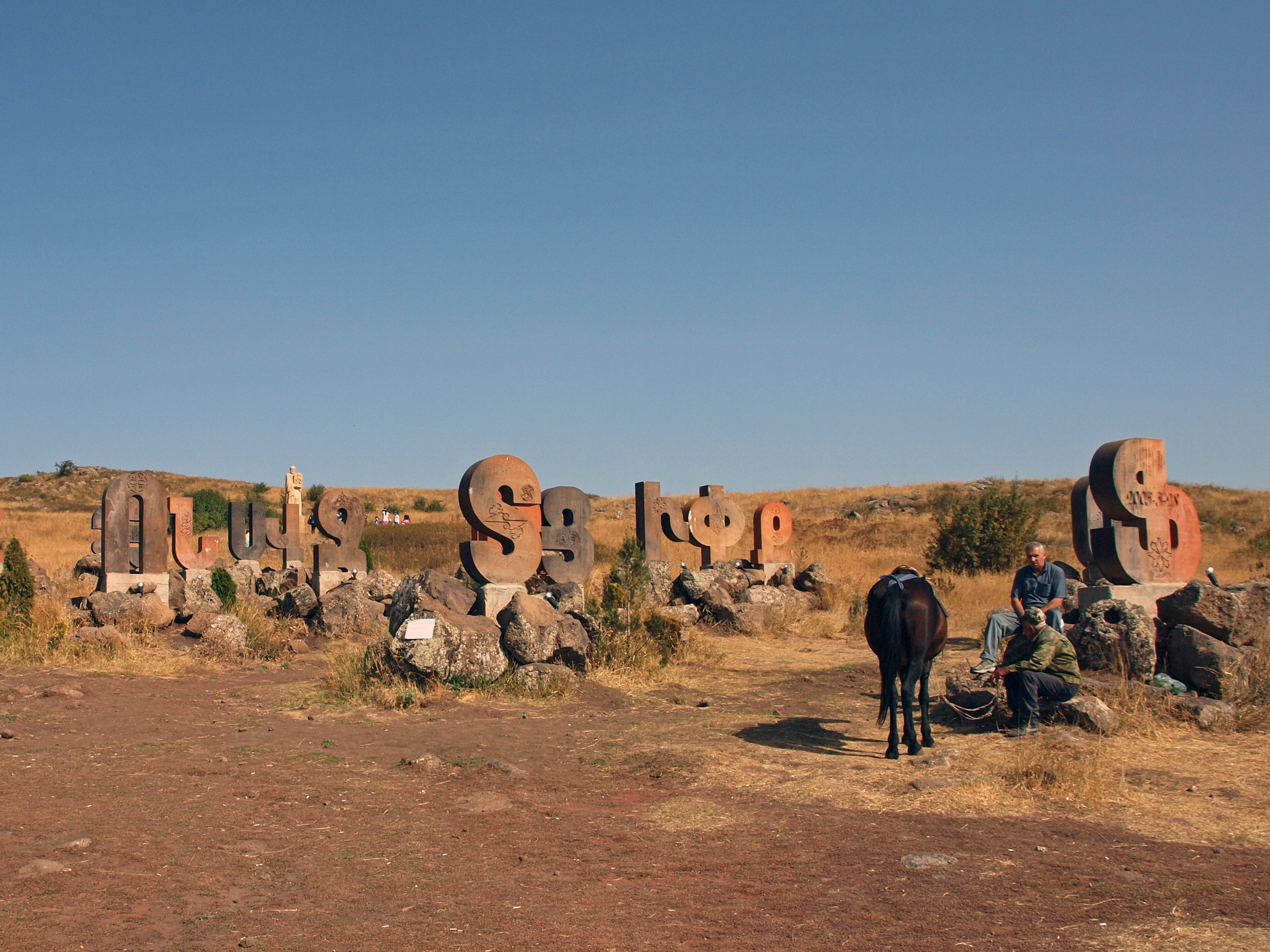
The Armenian Alphabet park

The 17th-century bridge of Ashtarak on Kasagh River is among the interesting sites of the Aragatsotn Province.

The urban settlements of the province are home to cultural palaces and many public libraries. The house-museum of novelist Perch Proshyan founded in 1948, is located in the town of Ashtarak within the Proshyan family house. It was last restored in 2008.

Aragatsotn is also home to the Armenian Alphabet Park located near the town of Aparan.

The Ashtarak Walnut Festival is taking place every year during the month of October to promote the famous walnut of Ashtarak. It was first celebrated in 2012.

Talin has its local "Talin Ashkharh" weekly newspaper.

=== Fortresses and archaeological sites ===
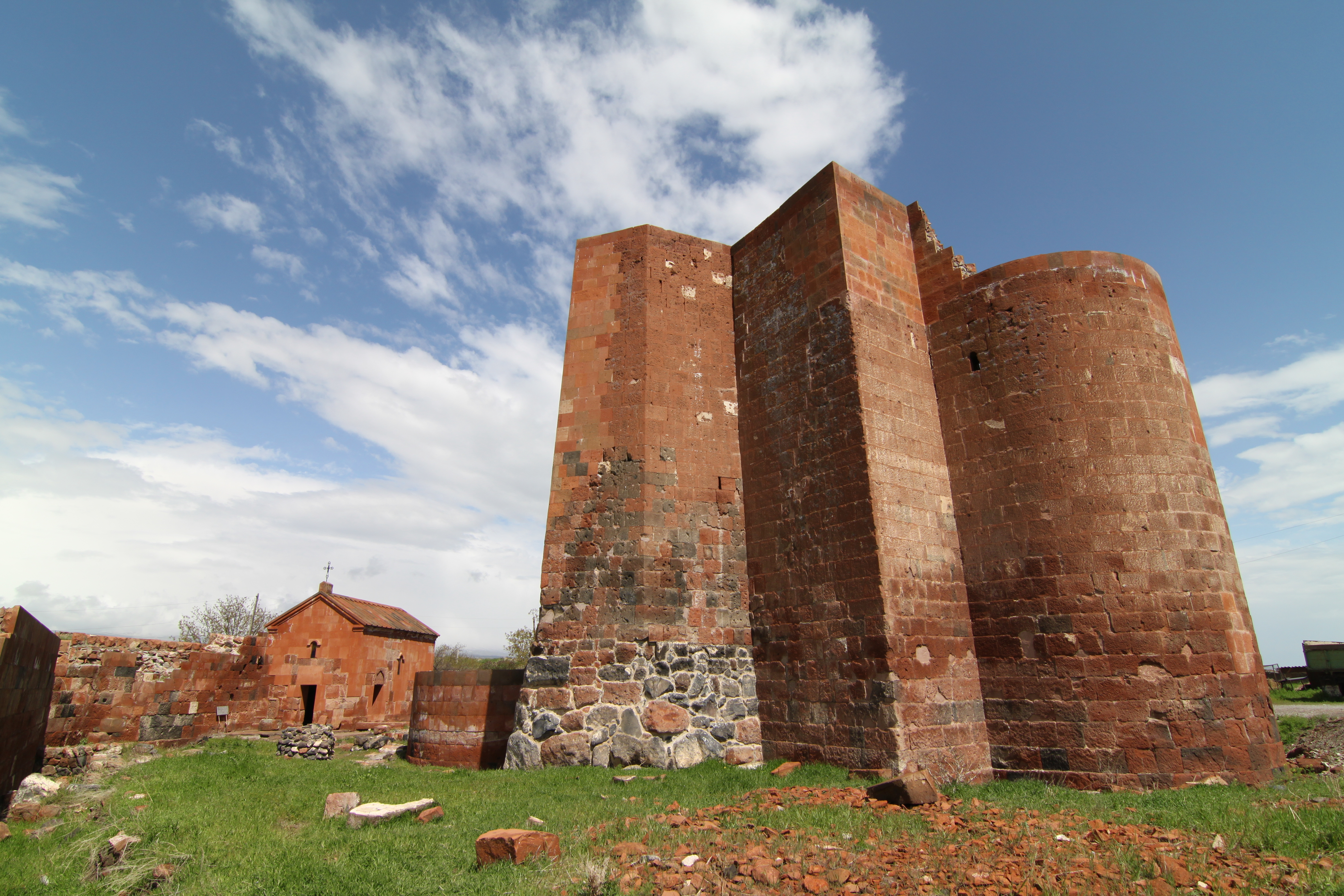
Dashtadem Fortress of the 9th-century

- Ushiberd fortress of the Iron Age,
- Verin Naver archaeological site, 24th-14th centuries BC
- Amberd fortress of the 7th century,
- Dashtadem Fortress of the 9th century.

=== Churches and monasteries ===
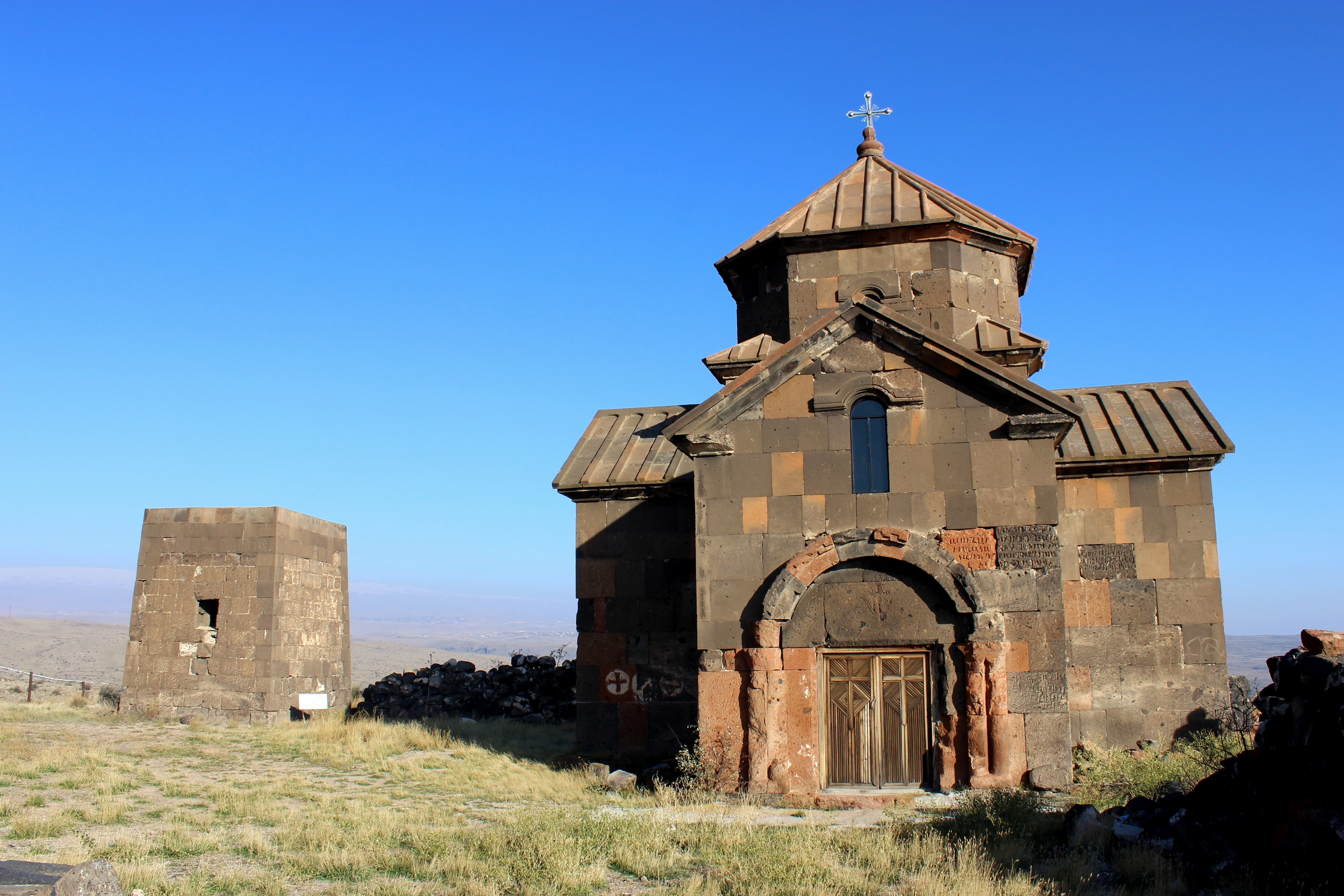
Saint Christopher Monastery of the 7th-century

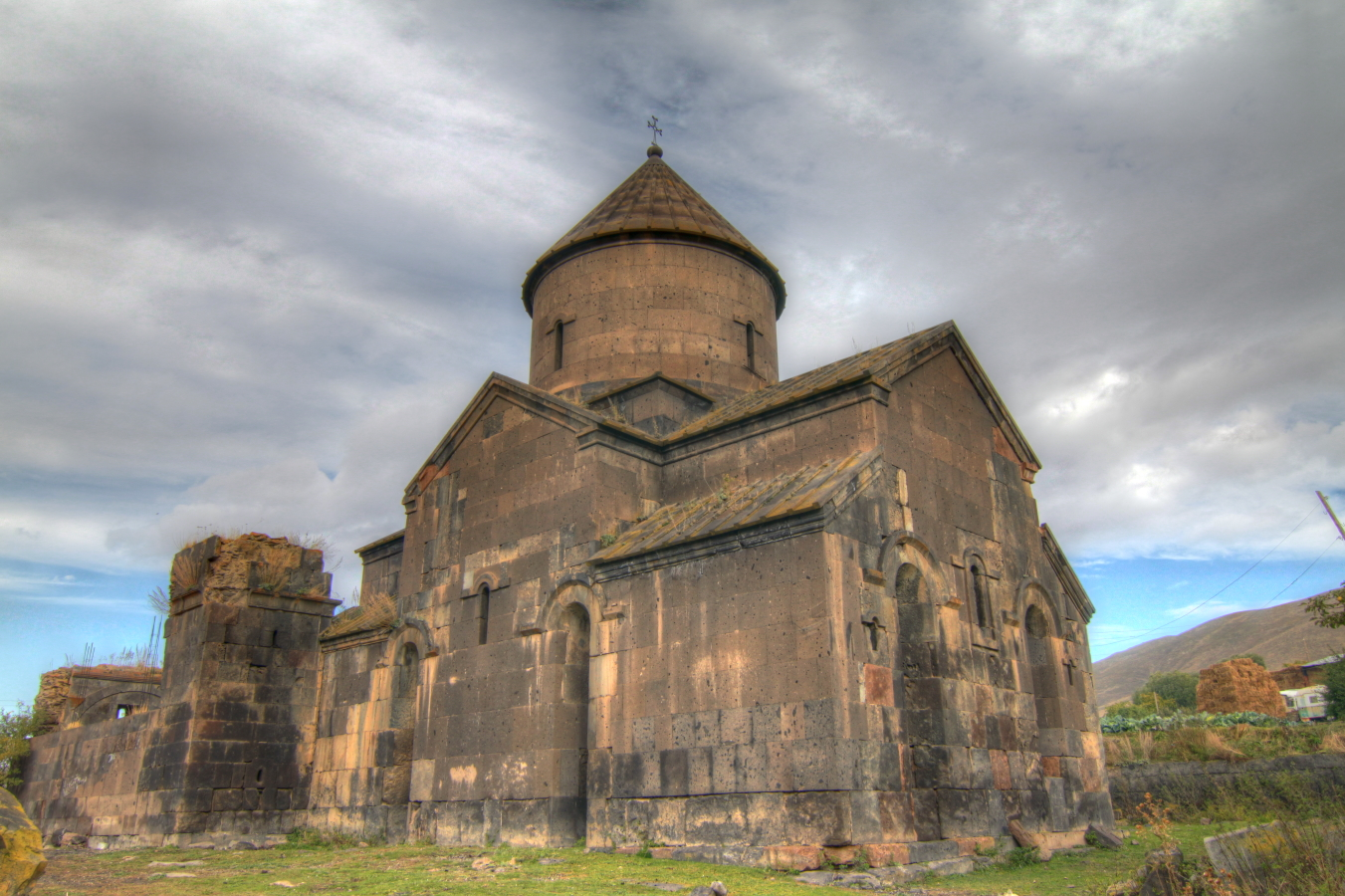
Yeghipatrush Church of the 10th century

- The Arshakid Kings Mausoleum and Basilica of the 4th century,
- Kasagh Basilica of the 4th century,
- Astvatsenkal Monastery, 4th-5th centuries,
- Saint Paul and Peter Church of Zovuni, 4th-5th centuries,
- Church of Saint John of Mastara, 5th century,
- Saint George Church of Garnahovit of the 7th century,
- Aruchavank Cathedral of the 7th century
- Saint Christopher Monastery of the 7th century,
- Artavazik Church monastery of the 7th century,
- Cathedral of Talin of the 7th century,
- Surp Hovhannes Church of Voskevaz, 7th century
- Tukh Manuk chapel of Lusagyugh, 7th century
- Saint Sarkis Monastery of Ushi, 7th century
- Yeghipatrush Church of the 10th century,
- Surp Hovhannes Church of Byurakan of the 10th century,
- Vahramashen Church of the 11th century,
- Tukh Manuk Chapel of Kuchak, 12th-13th centuries
- Tukh Manuk Shrine of Oshakan, 12-13th centuries,
- Hovhannavank Monastery of 1216,
- Tegher Monastery of the 13th century,
- Saghmosavank Monastery of the 13th century,
- Kosh fortress and churches, 13th-14th centuries,
- Saint Gevork Monastery of Mughni of the 14th century,
- Surp Astvatsatsin Church of Karbi, 17th century,
- Saint Mesrop Mashtots Church of 1879 in Oshakan,
- The churches of Spitakavor, Karmravor, Tsiranavor, Saint Mariane and Saint Sarkis in Ashtarak.

== Transportation ==
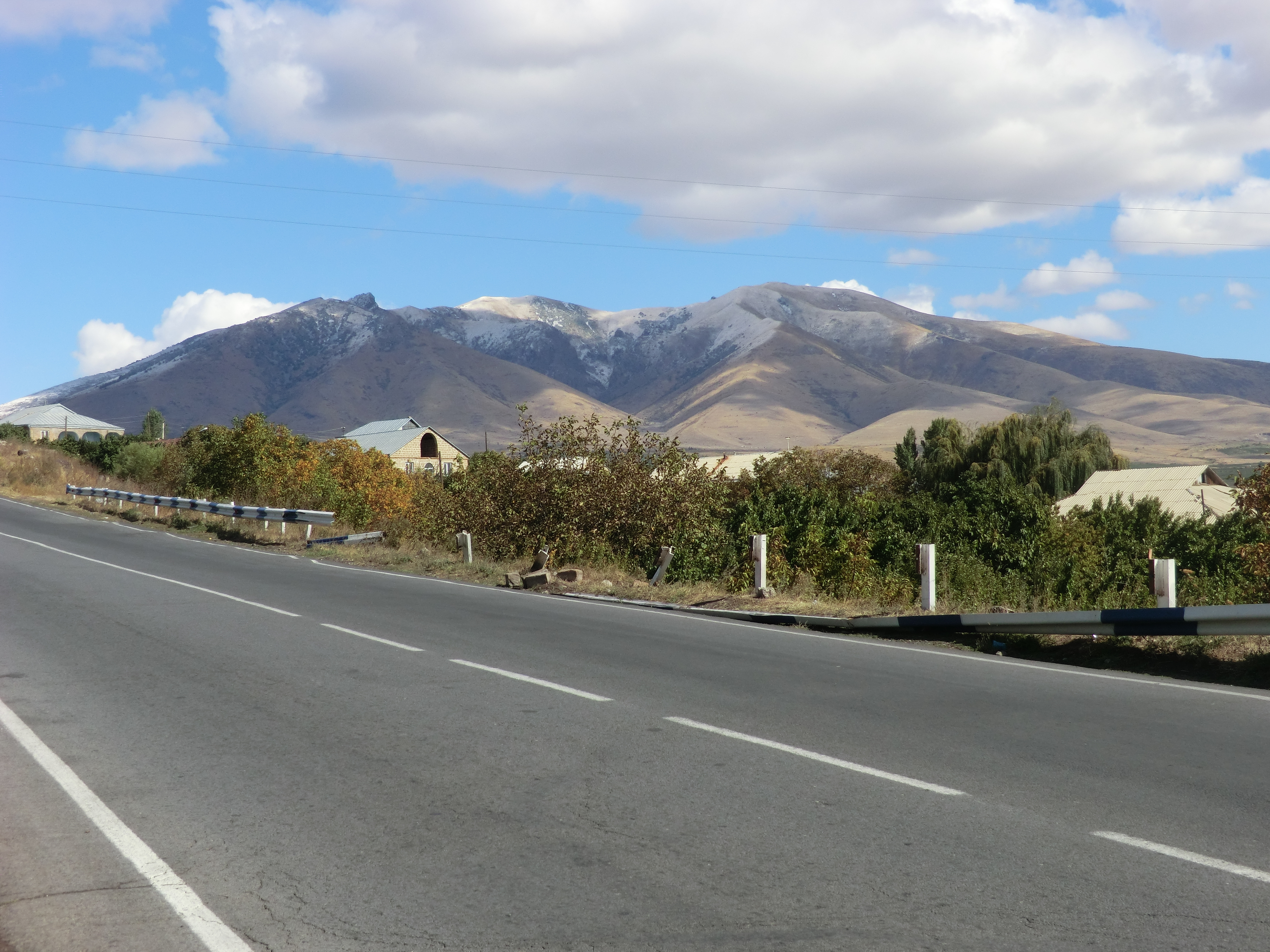
On the way to Ohanavan

The province is connected with the capital Yerevan through the Ashtarak highway.

The M-1 Motorway connects Aragatsotn with northwestern Armenia, including the city of Gyumri, while the M-3 Motorway connects the province with northeastern Armenia up to the Georgian border.

== Economy ==
=== Agriculture ===
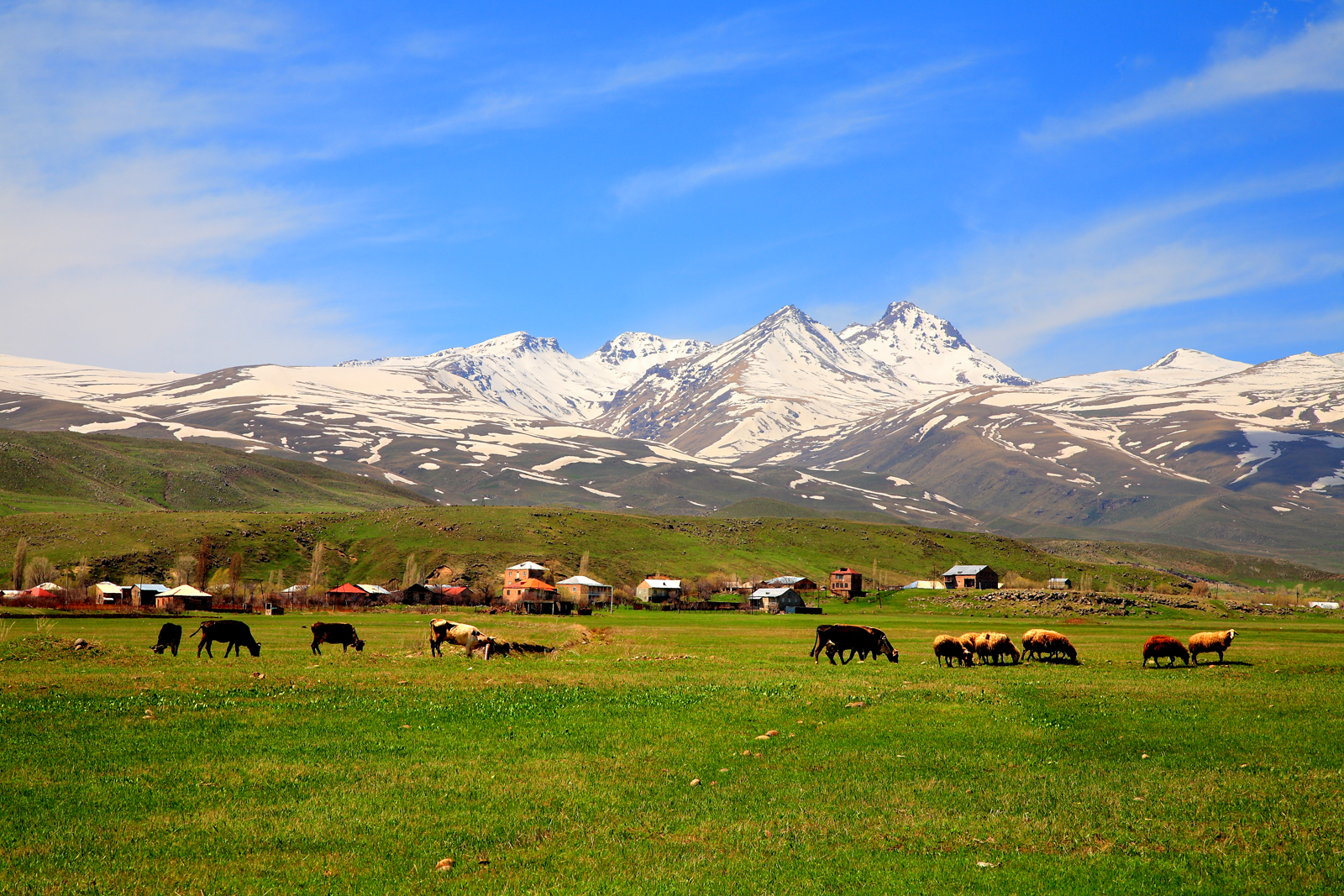
Cattle-breeding in Aragatsotn

The rural population of the province is 3 times bigger than the urban. Thus, the majority of the population is involved in agriculture, including farming and cattle breeding. Being a major agricultural region, Aragatsotn contributes 9.7% of the annual total agricultural product of Armenia.

Around 79% (2,178 km^{2}) of the total area of the province are arable lands, out of which 25% (542 km^{2}) are ploughed. With an approximate areա of 240 km^{2} (93 sq mi) of farmlands are occupied by grains and dry seeds. Around 40% of the 47 km^{2} (18 sq mi) of orchards in Aragatsotn are occupied by grapes. Potato farms occupy around 16 km^{2} (6 sq mi), while vegetables are spread over 10 km^{2} (4 sq mi) of farms.

Around the highlands of Mount Aragats, particularly in the regions of Aparan and Talin, cattle breeding is more common in rural communities. Beekeeping farms are also found in higher woodlands. The village of Voskehat is home to the "Ashtarak Dzu" poultry farm, while the Aragats village is home to the "Aragats Poultry farm".

=== Industry ===
Aragatsotn has a poor industrial structure compared to other provinces in Armenia. It has only a share of 2% of the annual total industrial product of Armenia. The existing industrial firms are mainly based on food processing, dairy products, production of alcoholic drinks, water bottling, and building materials production.

- Ashtarak is home to the "Ashtarak-Kat" company (founded in 1995), the leading ice-cream and dairy products manufacturer in Armenia. The town is also home to the "Gourmet Dourme" chocolate factory founded in 2007, the "P & D Group Armenia" for plastic containers founded in 2007, as well as the "Milen Art" plant, and the "Kharam Cooperative" for building materials production.

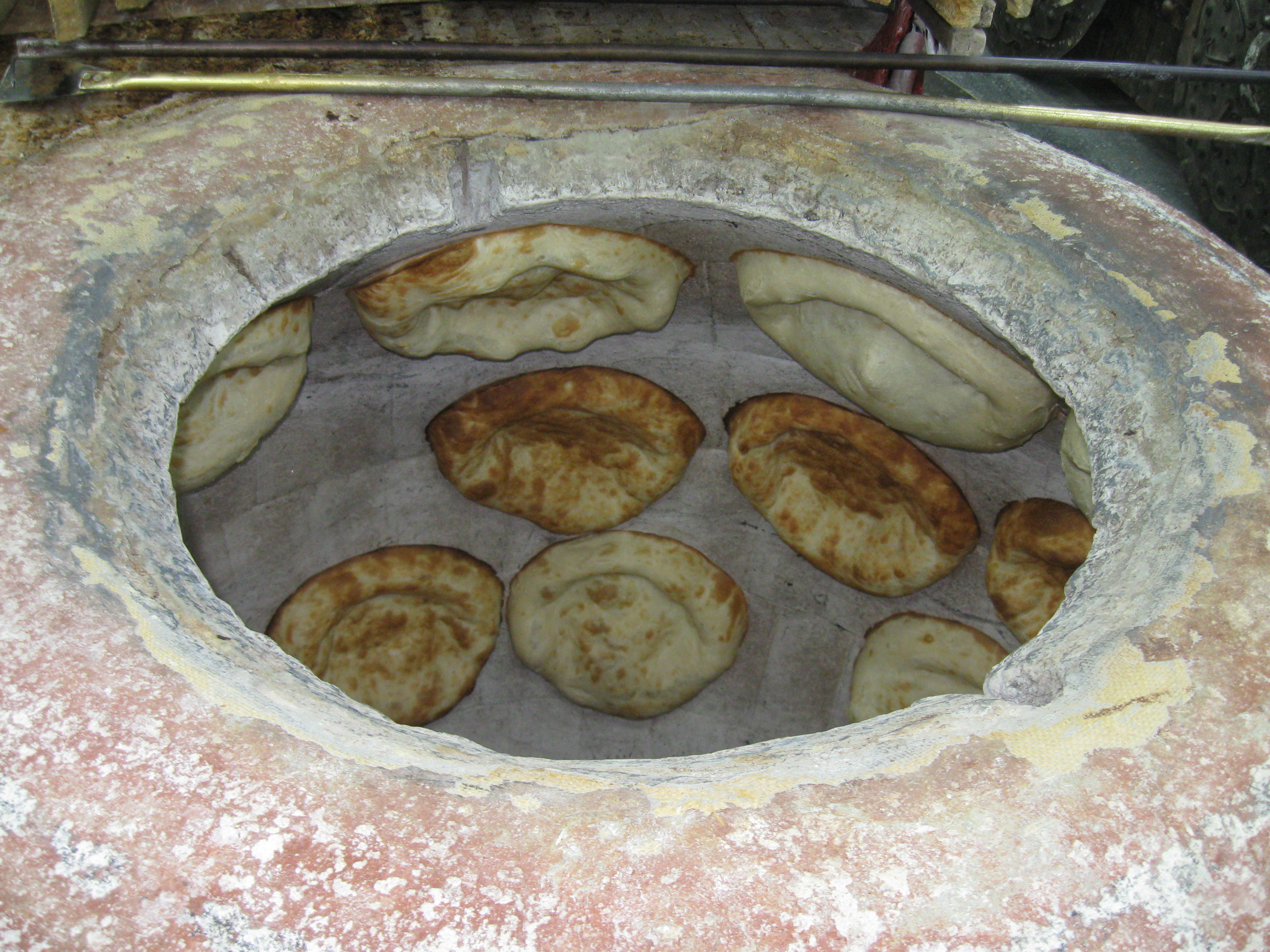
"Gntunik" bakery in Aparan using the traditional tandoor

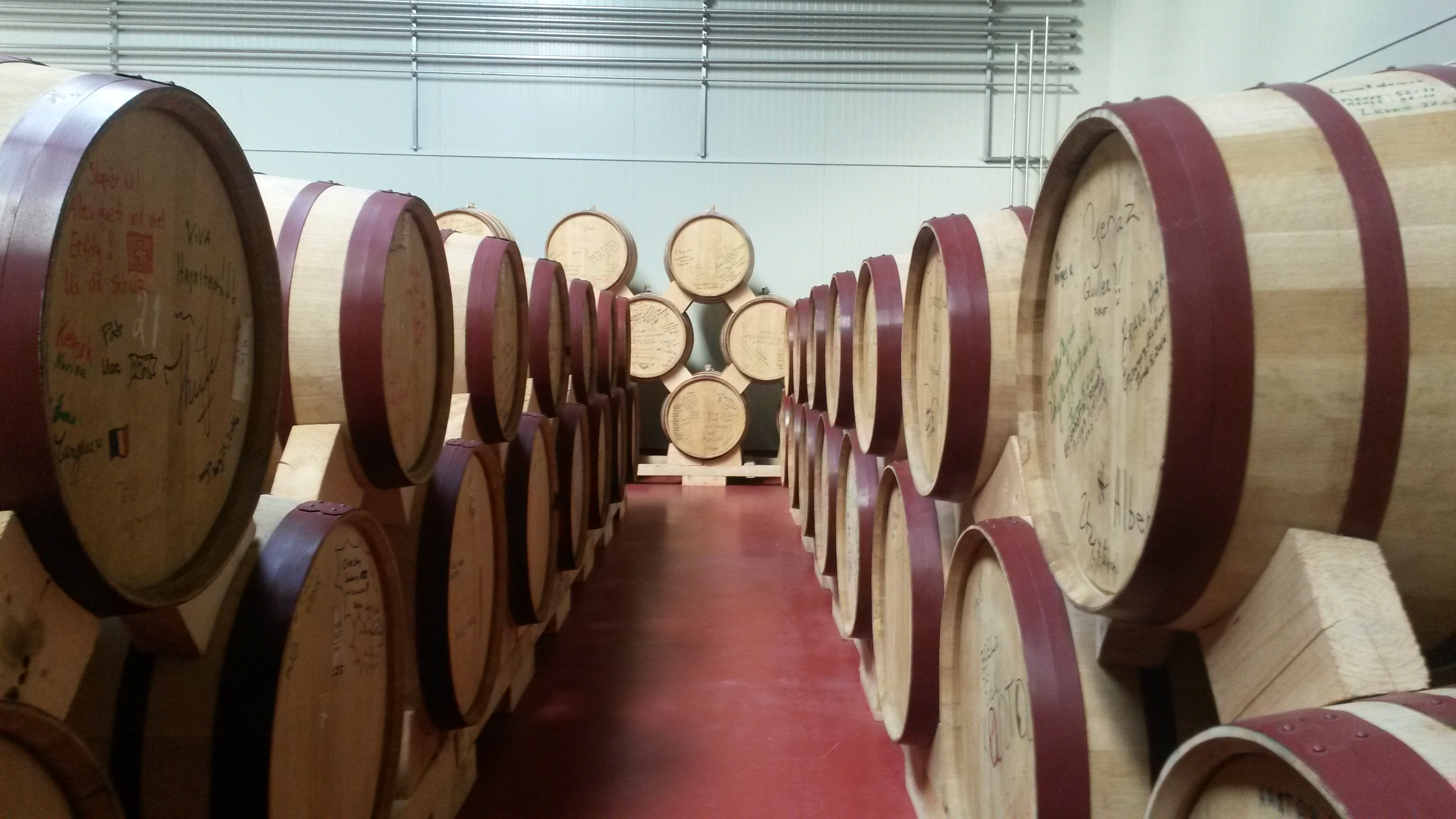
"Golden Grape ArmAs" winery in Nor Yedesia

- Aparan is home to the "Nig" factory for electrical products founded in 1964, the "Aparan Cheese Factory" founded in 1982 (privatized in 1995), and the "Aparan Group LLC" for bottled water, soft drinks, and dairy products, founded in 2006, and the "Gntunik" plant for bakery and dairy products.
- Aragatsotn is a major centre for dairy products and dried fruits. Talin is home to the "Bonilat" factory for dairy products founded in 2005, based on the former Talin cheese factory. Other producers of dairy products include the "Gloria Cheeses" factory founded in 2005 in Aragatsavan, the "Anulik" factory of Nigavan, the "Mastarchedo" plant of Mastara. The "Tamara Fruit" plant of Karbi (founded in 1985), the "Gyughi Tatik" plant of Oshakan (founded in 2002), the "Astghunk" plant of Aghdzk, and the "Byurakan Chir" plant of Byurakan specialize in dried-fruits production. Other notable food-processing plants of Aragatsotn include the "Village House" meat-processing plant in Agarak, the "Meat Art" for meet products in Getap, the "Avetsiyan Aghek" plant for soft drinks in Talin, the "Aparani Lavash" for bakery products in Davtashen,
- Aragatsotn has many large industrial firms for alcoholic drinks production, including the Voskevaz Winery founded in 1932 in Voskevaz (privatized in 2004), the ArmAs Winery founded in 2007 in Nor Yedesia, the Armenia Wine Winery founded in 2008 in Sasunik, the "Hayasy Group" for brandy, vodka, beer and juices founded in 2011 in Voskevaz, the Wine House Winery founded in 2011 in Aghdzk, and the "Van Ardi Winery founded in 2013 in Sasunik.
- The province has many large firms for the production of building materials, including the "Aragats Perlite" plant for crushed stone founded in 1961 in Aragatsavan, the "Arus" company for stone structures in Parpi, and the "Levadan LLC" for building materials. Other notable firms within the province include the "SKIFF" enterprise for paintwork materials founded in 2008 in Sasunik and the "Diamotech" factory for gemstones in Talin.

=== Tourism ===
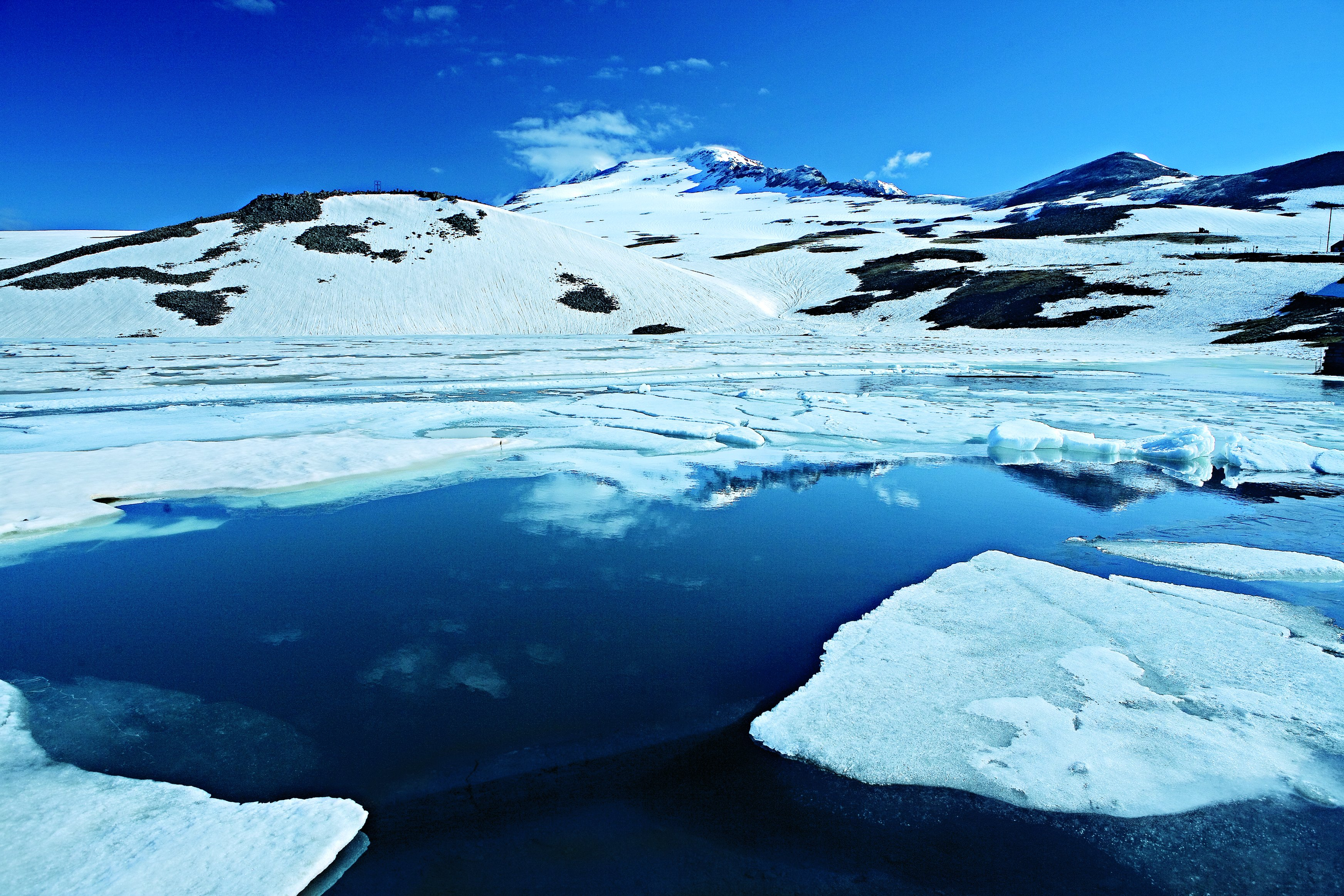
Mount Aragats and Lake Kari at the Aragats Alpine Sanctuary

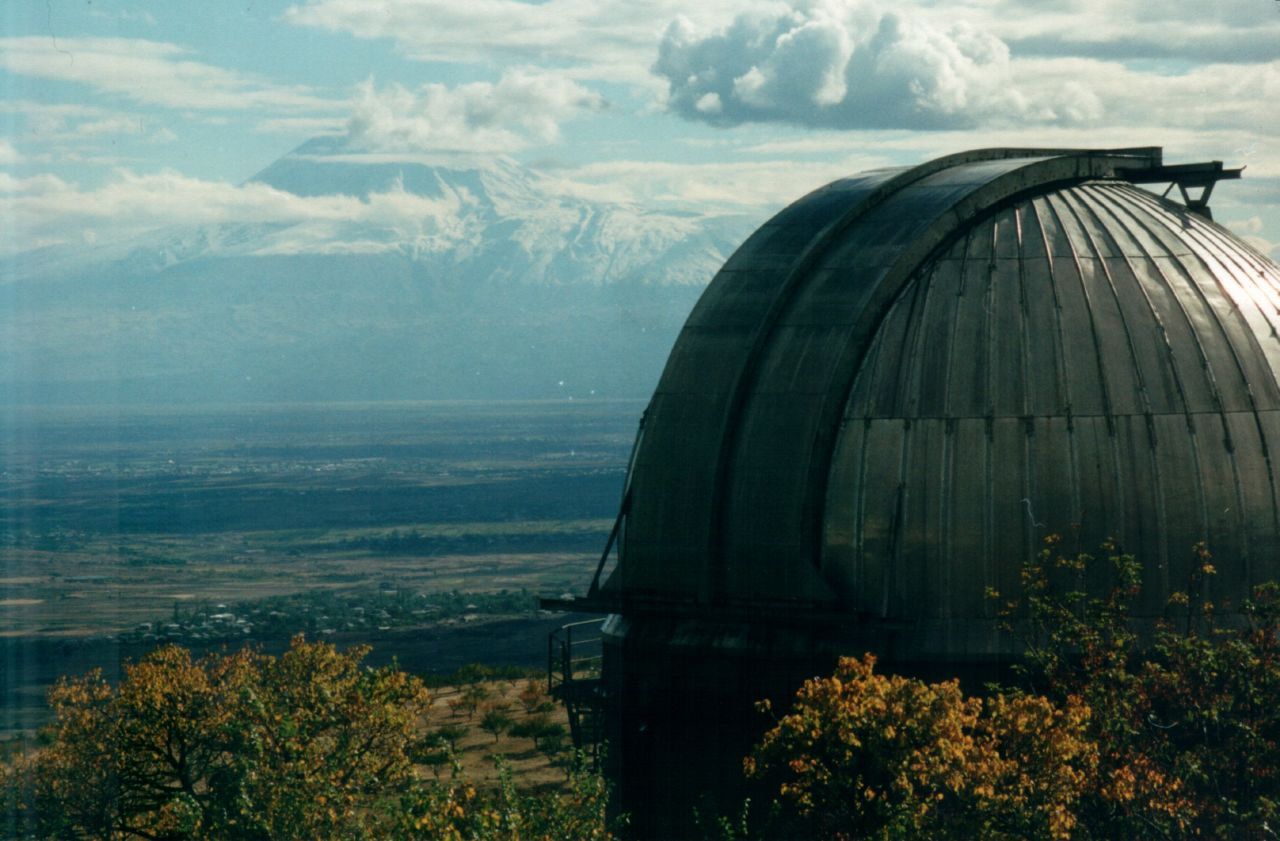
The Byurakan Observatory

Aragatsotn is a major centre for ecotourism and the lovers of extreme tourism. Aragats is the highest mountain in modern-day Armenia. It is a single extinct volcano consisting of 4 peaks: the northern (4090 m.), western (4080 m.), eastern (3916 m.), and southern (3879 m.) peaks. Thus, it frequently attracts hikers and adventure travelers, with its mountain lake of Kari situated at a height of 3250 meters.

The well-preserved ancient monasteries and medieval fortresses are also among the main attractions of the province.

Luxury hotels are found in Byurakan, Aghtsk and Ashtarak. Byurakan is also home to the Byurakan Observatory.

The Mount Aragats and Lake Kari are among the touristic destinations of the province. The government protects the area as a wildlife sanctuary named Aragats Alpine Sanctuary.

The Abaran Battle Memorial and the Armenian Alphabet Park near Aparan are also among the most visited locations in Aragatsotn.

== Education ==
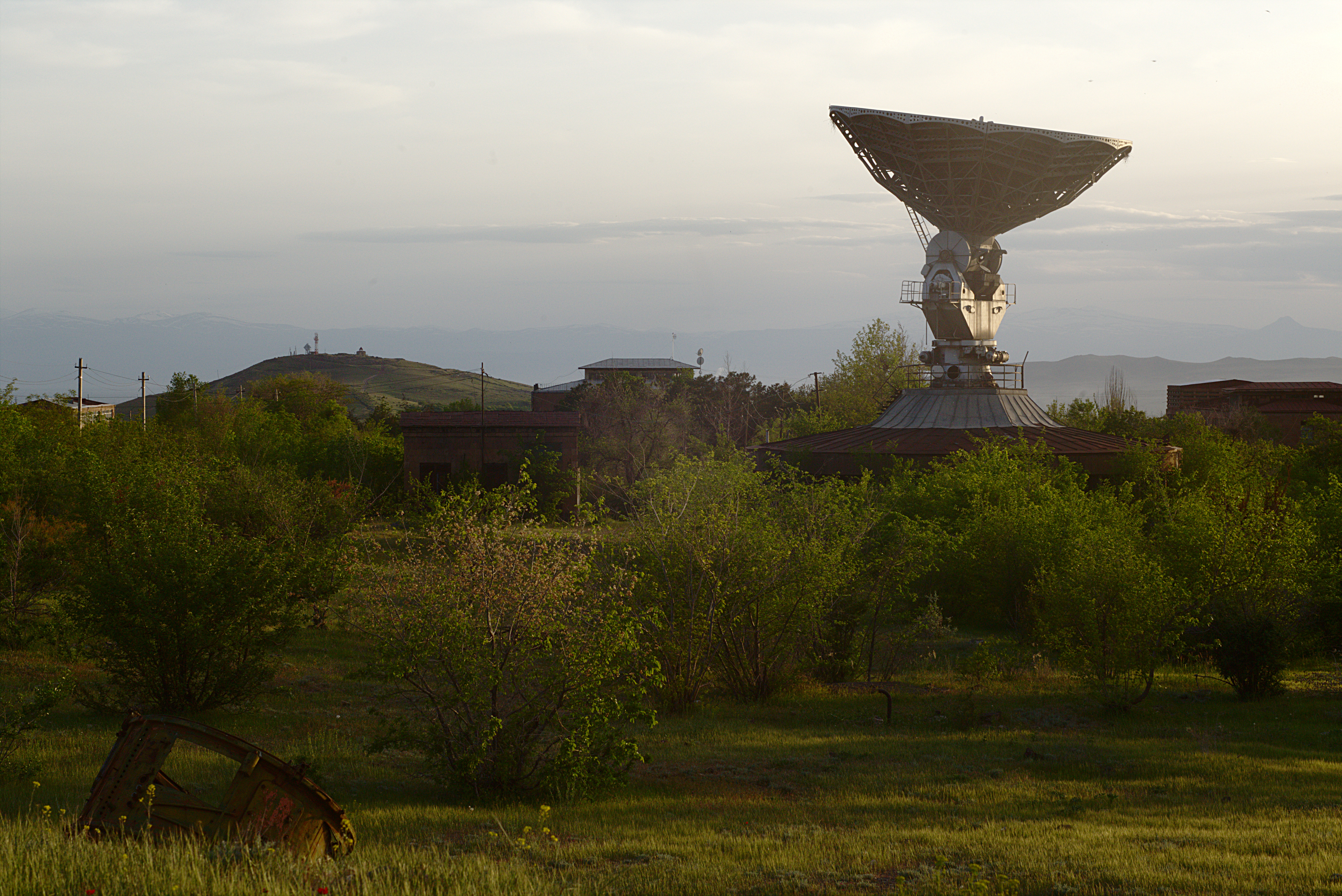
Radio telescope at the Ashtarak Institute of Radiophysics and Electronics

As of the 2015-16 educational year, Aragatsotn Province has 123 schools, out of which 119 are operated by the province administration, while 4 are under the direct supervision of the Ministry of Education and Science. The total number of the schools includes the 20 schools that are designated for the ethnic Yazidi and Kurdish minorities. As of the end of 2015, the number of students in the province's schools is 17,010. There is also one school for special needs in the province.

The town of Ashtarak is home to 2 major research institutions: the Mikael Ter-Mikaelian Institute for Physical Research and the Institute of Radiophysics and Electronics.

The village of Byurakan is home to the Byurakan Observatory operated by the Armenian National Academy of Sciences.

The house-museum of novelist Perch Proshyan founded in 1948 in Ashtarak, is among the most significant cultural centres of the province.

== Sport ==
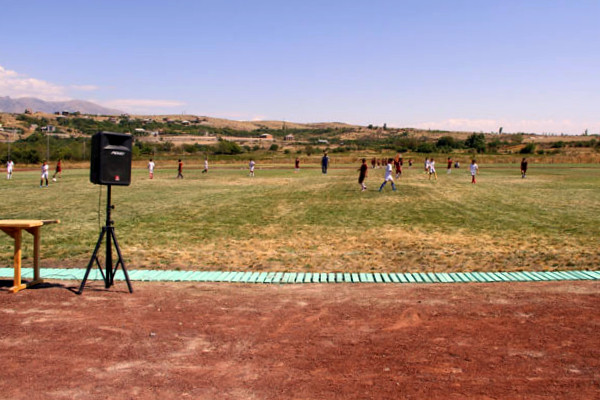
Football stadium in the village of Parpi

Football is the most popular sport in Aragatsotn. The province was represented at the Armenian Premier League by FC Mika of Ashtarak until 2007 when they were relocated to Yerevan.

The Kasaghi Marzik Stadium in Ashtarak is the largest sports venue in the province. The sports centres in Ashtarak were entirely renovated and opened in July 2017, with an approximate cost of US$1 million. Ashtarak is also home to the Ayrudzi horse racing club.

It is planned to construct a modern sports complex in the village of Parpi. The football stadium of the complex was opened in 2013.

At the height of 2000 meters above sea level, the town of Aparan has a ski resort served with a ski lift.

== Notable natives ==
- Ghazar Parpetsi (circa 442-early 6th century), 5th to 6th-century Armenian chronicler and historian.
- Gevorg I of Byurakan (?-795), Catholicos of All Armenians.
- Abu Sa'id Bahadur Khan (1305–1335), 9th ruler of the Ilkhanate.
- Nerses V of Ashtarak (1770–1857), Catholicos of All Armenians.
- Perch Proshyan (1837–1907), Armenian writer.
- Smbat Shahaziz (1840–1908), Armenian poet.
- Norair Sisakian (1907–1966), Soviet Armenian biochemist.
- Gevorg Emin (1918–1998), Armenian poet.
- Emil Gabrielian (1931–2010), Armenian physician.
- Vardges Petrosyan (1932–1994), Armenian writer.

== Gallery ==
Aragatsotn

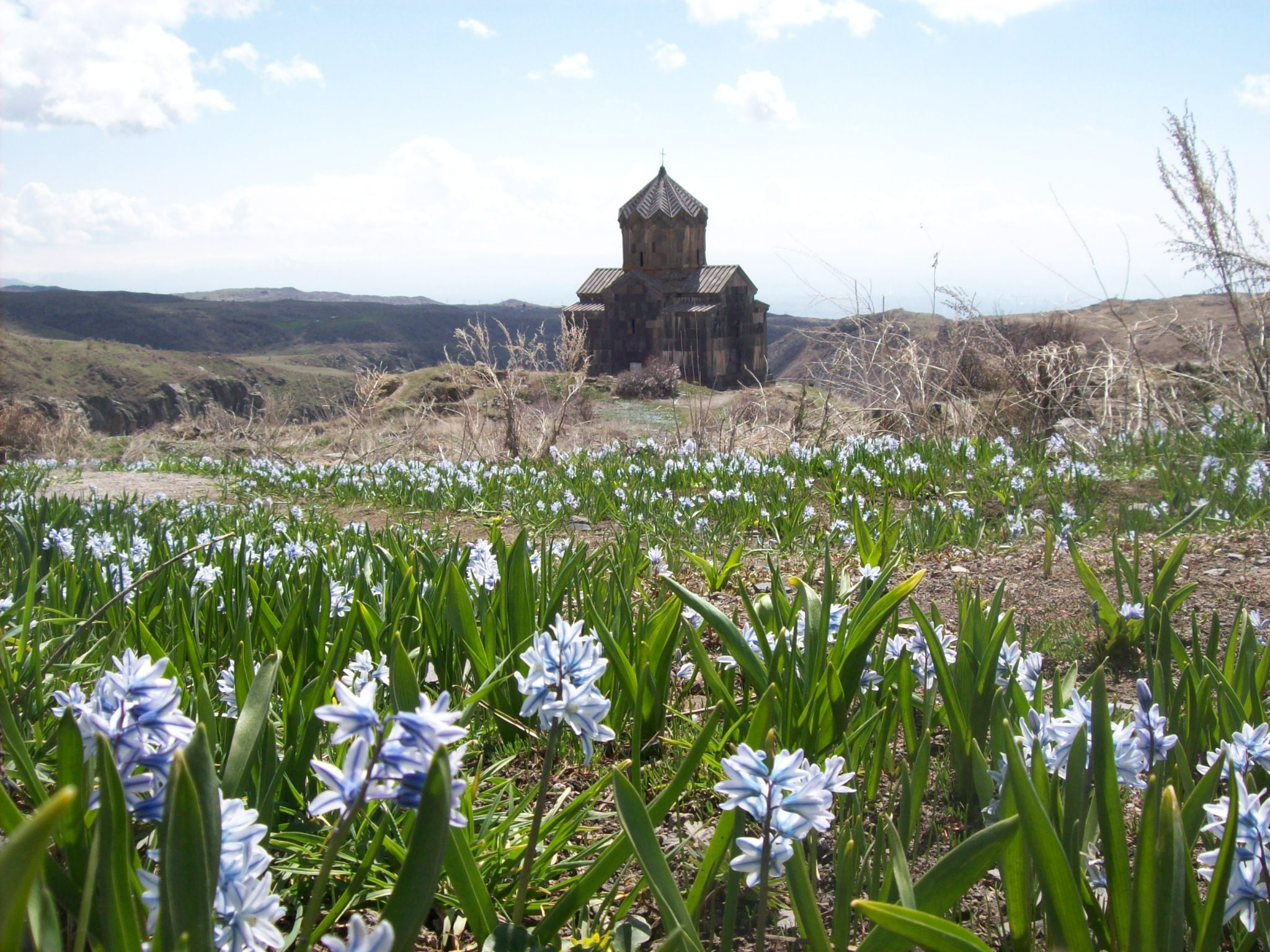
Vahramashen Surp Astvatsatsin Church of 1026

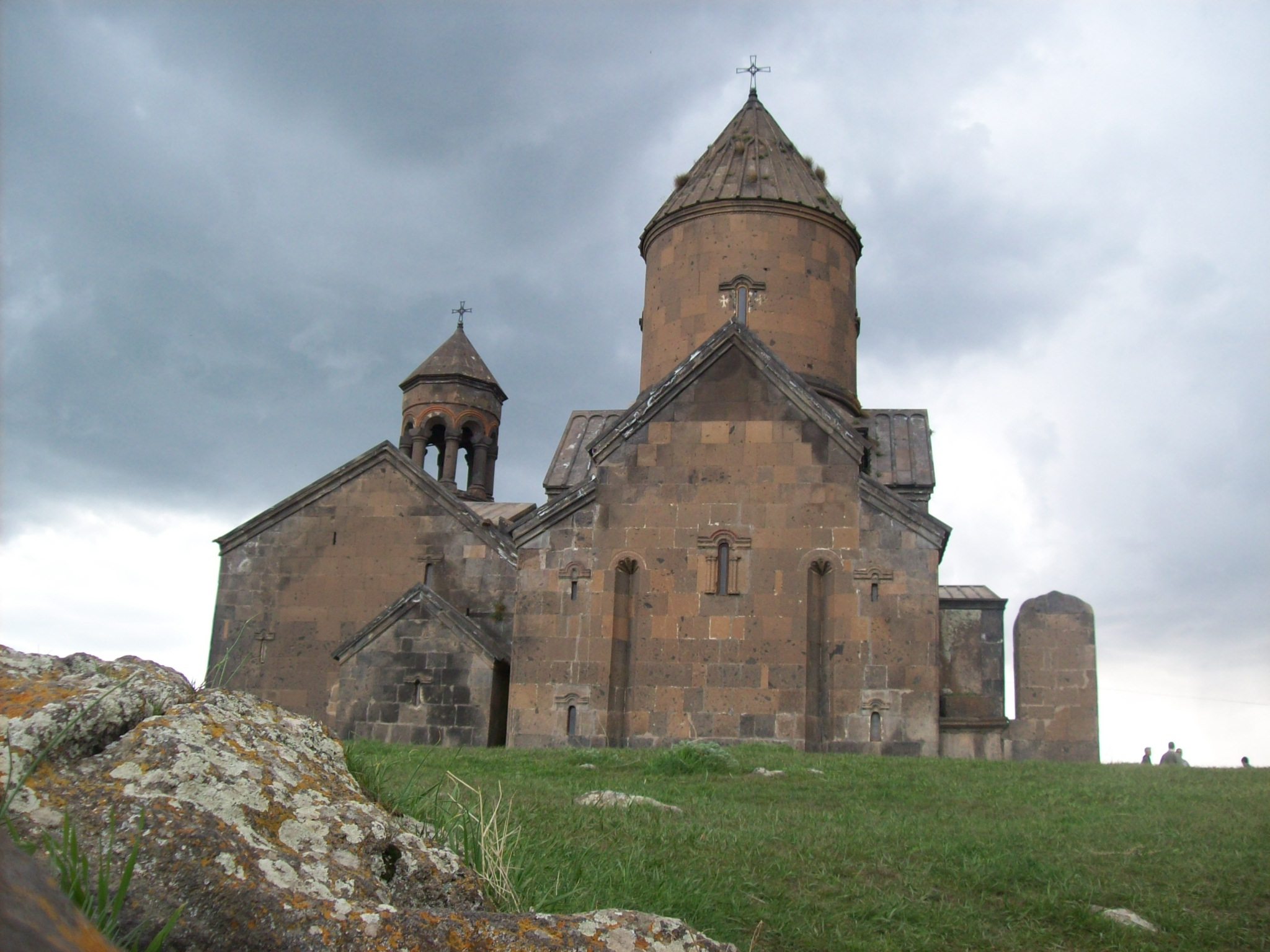
Saghmosavank Monastery, 13th century

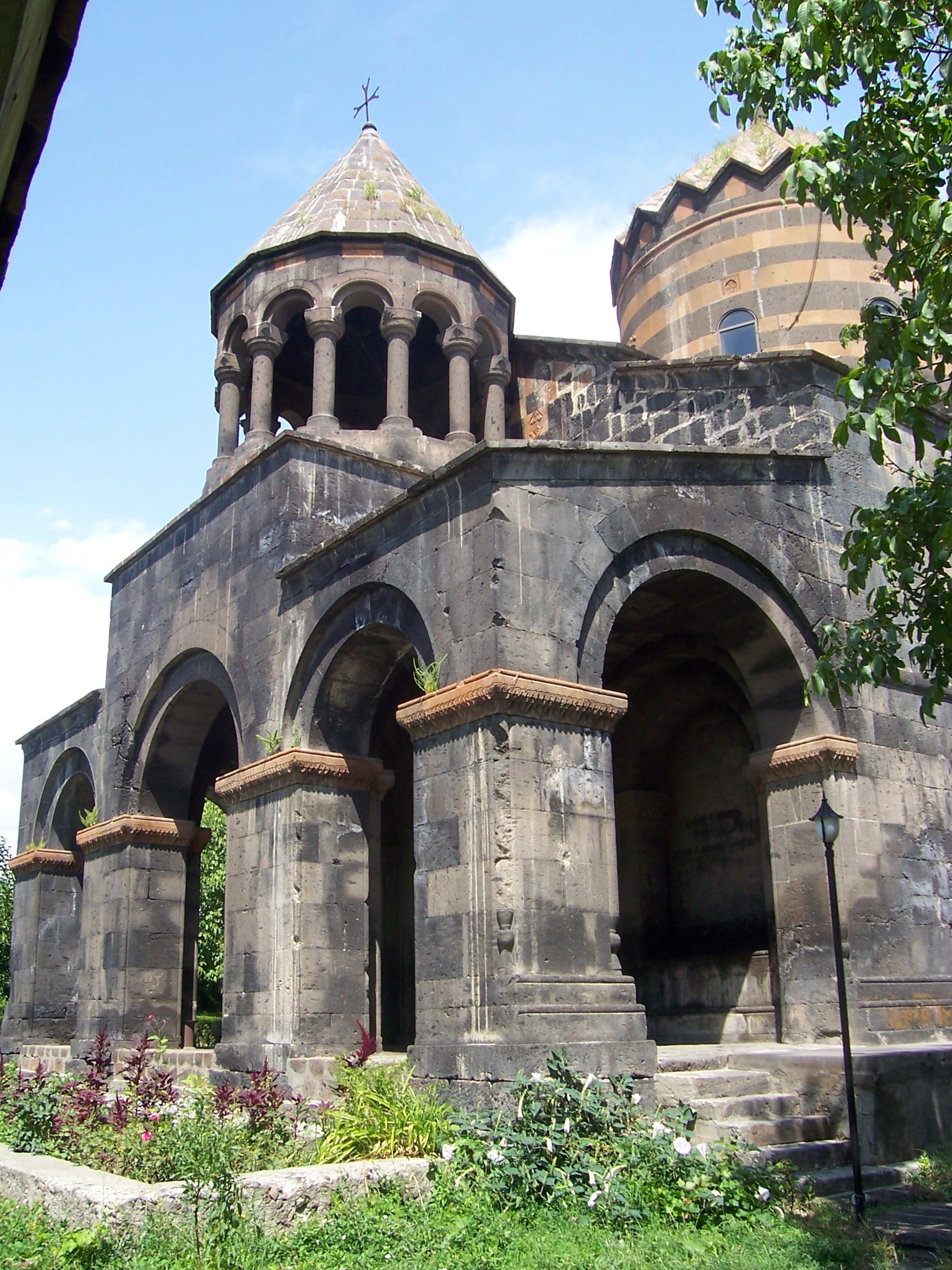
Saint Gevorg Monastery of Mughni, 14th century

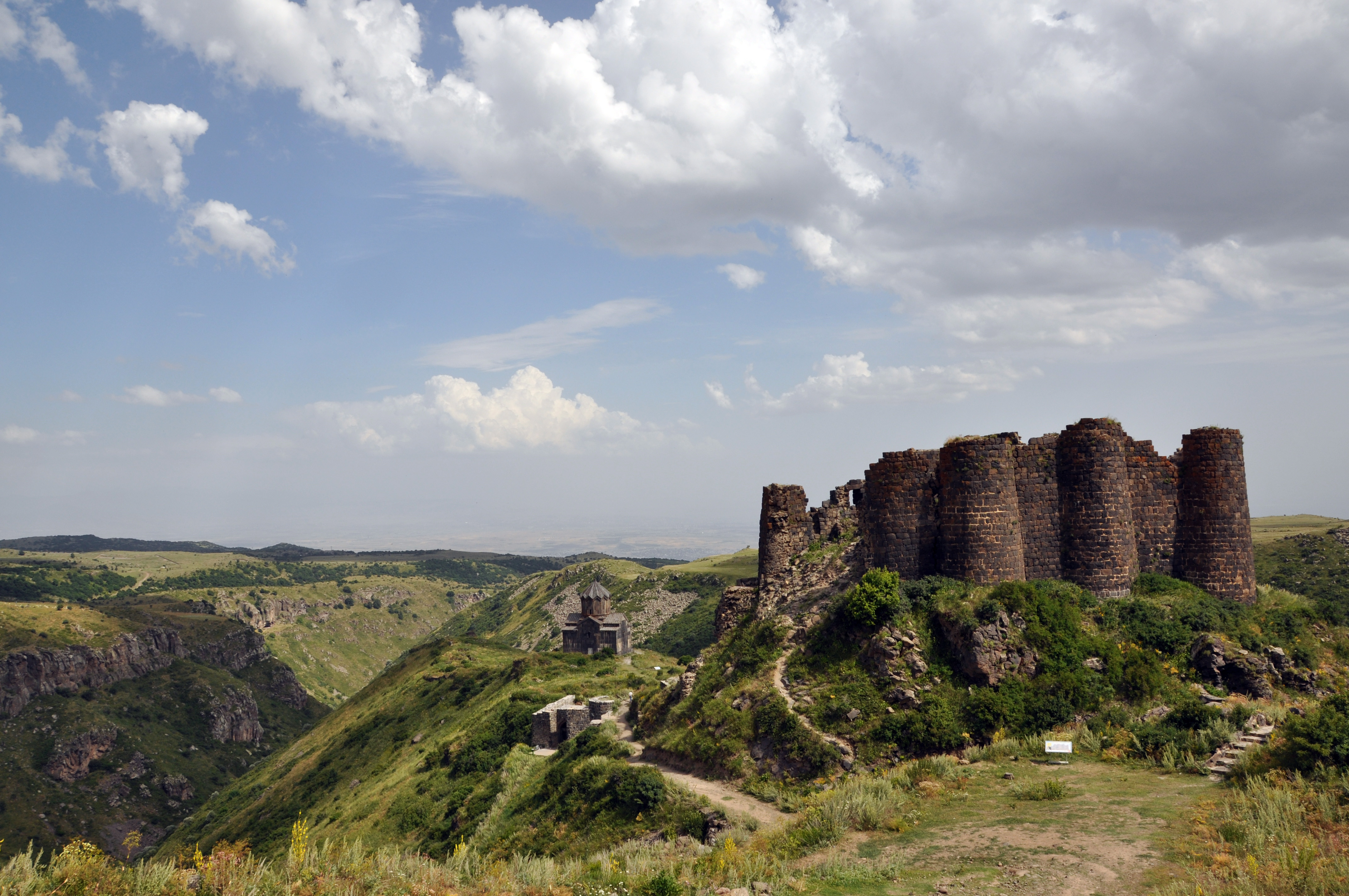
Amberd fortress and Vahramashen Church

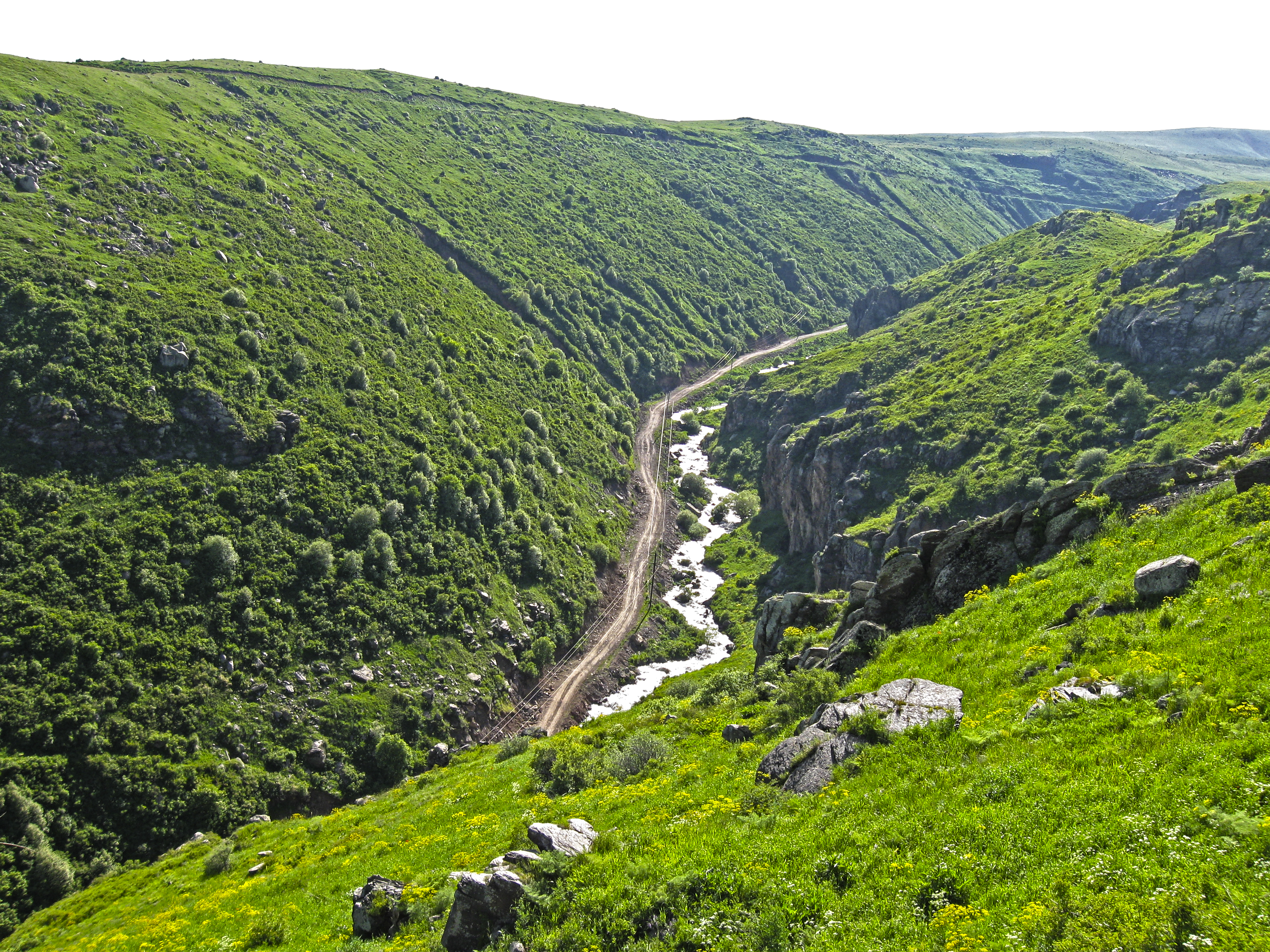
Amberd river valley

== See also ==
- Mount Aragats
- Yazidis in Armenia
