= Karbi, Armenia =

Karbi Կարբի
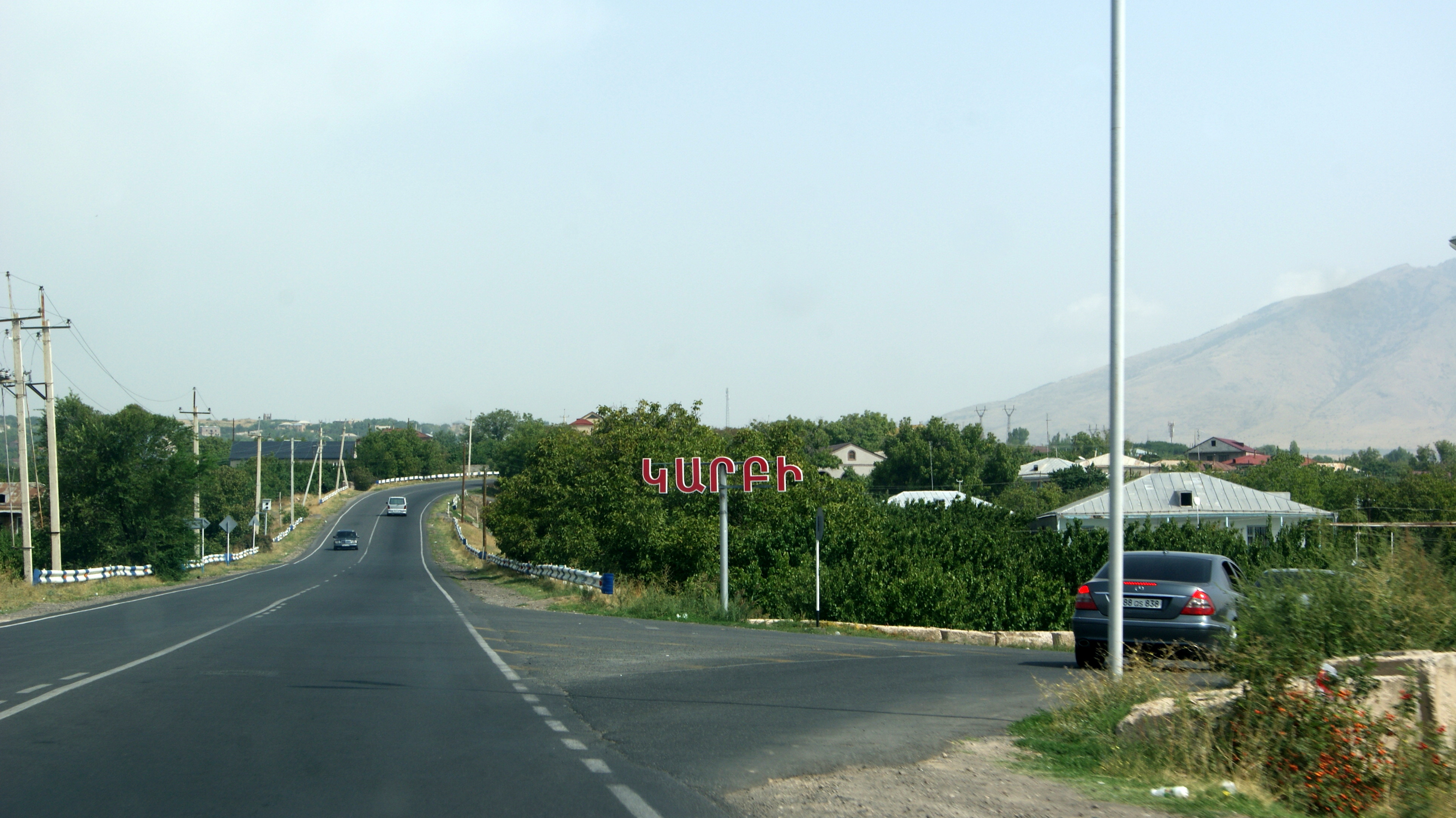
- The road leading to the village

- Location within Armenia Location within Aragatsotn
- Coordinates: 40°19′52″N 44°22′35″E
- Country: Armenia
- Province: Aragatsotn
- Municipality: Ashtarak

Population (2011)
  - Total: 3,666
- Time zone: UTC+4
  - Summer (DST): UTC+5

Karbi (Armenian: Կարբի) is a village in the Ashtarak Municipality of the Aragatsotn Province of Armenia, near the town of Ashtarak. Within the area there is a triple-nave basilica of S. Astvatsatsin dated to 1691-93 with an unattached adjacent belfry of 1338. In the village there are also S. Gevorg or S. Kiraki church of the 11th to 13th centuries, Tsiranavor, a Tukh Manuk shrine, and "Zargarents Zham" chapel built between the 11th and 13th centuries.

== History ==
Gevorg Jahukyan proposed an etymology from Urartian word qarbi(e) meaning "cliff".

Karbi was recorded in manuscripts as early as the 13th century and is also mentioned in an inscription of the same period upon the southern wall of the Katoghike Church of the Astvatsnkal Monastery built between the 5th and 13th centuries. It reads,

By the grace and mercy of God, I Kurd, Prince of Princes, son of the great Vache, and my wife Khorishah, daughter of Marzpan, built the Holy Katoghike for the memory of our souls. We have decorated it with every kind of precious ornament and offered the garden bought by us in Parpi, virgin land in Oshakan, a garden in Karbi, a villager (?), and three hostels, in the year 693/AD 1244.

The history of Karbi has been one marked by invasions, destruction and plundering. In the manuscripts (late 14th to mid-15th centuries) written by Thomas of Metsoph, he left an account of the invasions of Timur Lenk in the 14th century and stated that, "Next [Timur] came to the Araratean country and Karbi and the Kotayk country." During this time, development in the village was suspended.

In the first half of the 17th century, Karbi was severely damaged in the Perso-Turkish wars. After the period of peace ensuing in 1639, restoration of the buildings began and trade broadened.

In 1724, the Ottoman military commanders Güç Ali and Yalguz Hasan were dispatched under the orders of Abdullah Pasha to advance and lay siege to Karbi, and plunder the village and enslave its inhabitants. Each of the leaders originally had under their command approximately 1,800 soldiers, and had suffered high casualties during their advance on the city of Yerevan at a battle near Yeghvard in March 1724.

The residents of Karbi learned of the advancing armies and began to fortify their settlement to help defend against the Ottoman army. Village elders sent a messenger to Khan Mehr Ali of Yerevan with word that, "The Ottoman army has arrived and laid siege to Karbi. If you are willing to send troops, we are ready to defend our town with our lives. We shall attack the enemy and shall drive them out." The Khan of Yerevan did not respond to their urgent plea, nor did he send his troops.

The residents of the village decided to stand firm and defend their land from the invading forces, and successfully did so for forty days. Abdullah Pasha came with his troops to support his two military commanders, but did not attack Karbi. He instead sent word and asked that the village return to being subject to the Ottoman Empire, and in return he would leave troops behind to protect them. The elders asked for ten days to convince the other defenders to submit to the Pasha. He agreed to their request.

During these ten days, the elders secretly sent a message to Khan Mehr Ali of Yerevan and said, "Besieged by Ottoman forces, we were forced to give our word to the Ottoman commander that we would surrender Karbi in ten days, for we cannot withstand such a large army. Tell us what we should do." The Khan gave a response that he would send gunpowder as well as small cannons, and ordered for them not to surrender but instead to keep fighting as they have. He added that, "Your Catholicos, Asdvadzadur, has gone to see Shah Tahmasp to seek advice on this dangerous conflict which is upon us. Have patience, therefore, until we hear some news of assistance from them."

The elders decided after the end of the ten days to return control of Karbi to Abdullah Pasha's army. The Ottoman's sent word to "Prepare to submit and surrender your arms." When asked how many residents were living in the confines of the village, the elders responded that "There are some six thousand individuals." The residents did as was asked of them and surrendered their weapons to the Ottoman army. The Pasha gave each of the high elders a kalat which are robes of honor made of fine material, and also ordered that six companies of troops stay behind to guard the village. He then went on with the rest of his troops to lay siege to Yerevan.

Karbi is known to have had a brief visit during October 1734 by Abraham Kretatsi during the time while he was serving the Catholicos Abraham II. He wrote, "The next day, at my request, we went to Parpi and from there to Karbi, where we spent the night at the residences of Paron Khachatur and Paron Ohazar."
