= Oshakan =

Village in Aragatsotn, Armenia

Oshakan Օշական
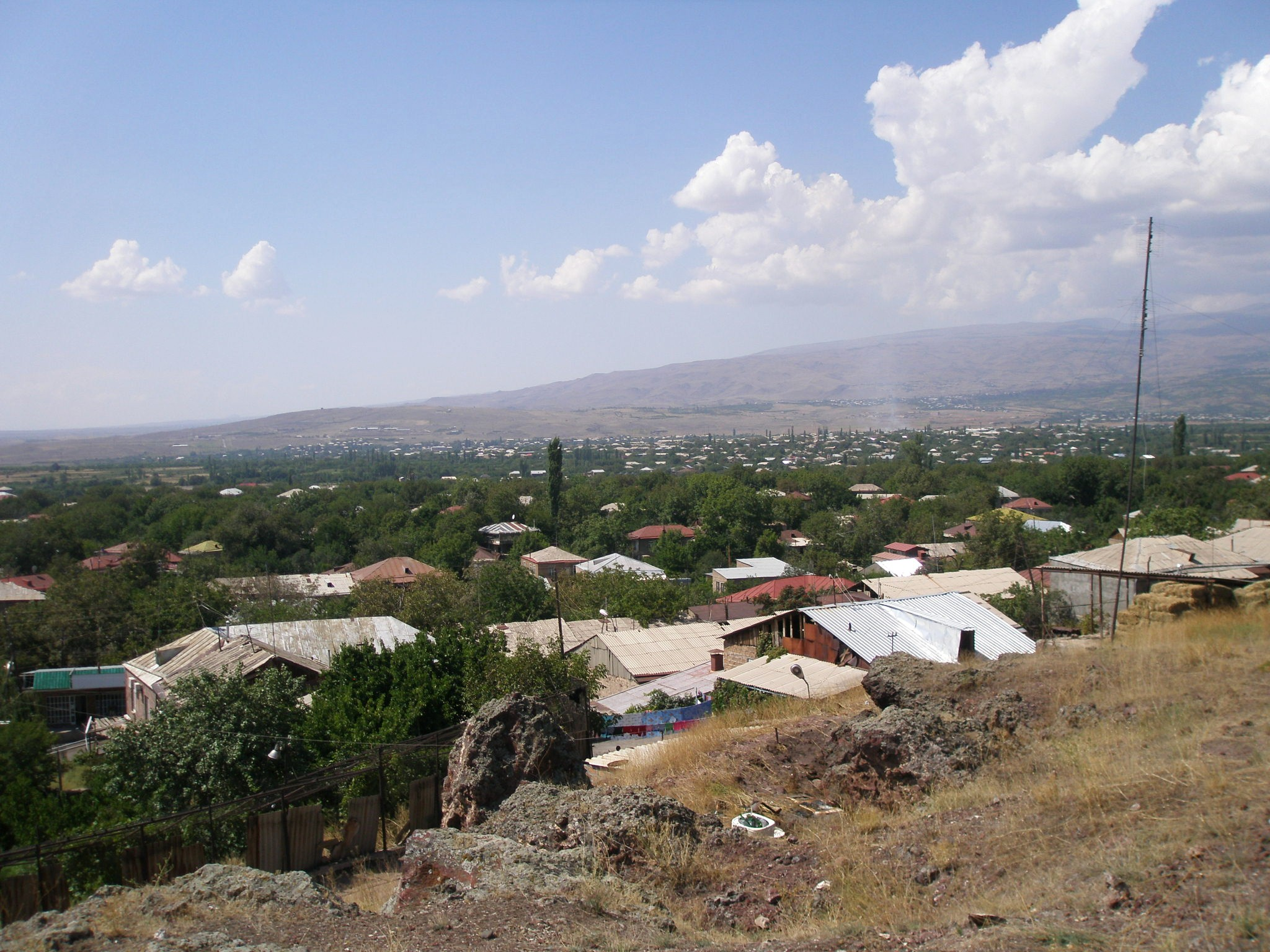
- Oshakan as seen from the western side of Didikond Hill.

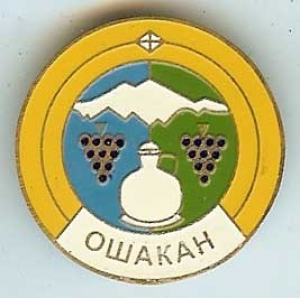
- Coat of arms

- Location within Armenia Location within Aragatsotn
- Coordinates: 40°15′48″N 44°18′53″E
- Country: Armenia
- Province: Aragatsotn
- Municipality: Ashtarak

Population (2011)
  - Total: 4,780
- Time zone: UTC+4
  - Summer (DST): UTC+5
- Website: https://oshakan.weebly.com/

Oshakan (Armenian: Օշական) is a village in the Ashtarak Municipality of the Aragatsotn Province of Armenia located 3 kilometers southwest from Ashtarak. It is well known to historians and pilgrims of the Armenian Apostolic Church as the site of the grave of Mesrop Mashtots, the inventor of the Armenian alphabet.

== History ==
For the name of the village, Garnik Asatrian and Gohar G. Hakobian suggested an origin either from Middle Iranian *ōšakān, "burning [place]", meaning either "fire-temple" or "cemetery, graveyard" via Middle Persian ōš "death".

During the Arsacid dynasty of the Kingdom of Armenia, it served as the main town of Ayrarat province and the capital of its Aragatsotn canton from which the Amatuni noble family ruled. However, Oshakan is best known for the Saint Mesrop Mashtots Church which is the burial place of Saint Mesrop Mashtots, the creator of the Armenian alphabet. The church houses his grave and was rebuilt by Catholicos George IV in 1875. Wall paintings on the interior were done in 1960 by the artist H. Minasian. Saint Mesrop Cathedral is the seat of the Aragatsotn Diocese of the Armenian Apostolic Church.

Just to the south of the town is the Didikond Hill, where excavations have uncovered a fort and five palaces built around the 7th to 5th centuries BC.

To the north of town located in the Mankanots Valley is Saint Sion Church dating from the 7th century AD. It is believed to mark the grave of Byzantine Emperor Mauricius or his mother, as one historian claims he came from Oshakan. Adjacent to the church is a pillar on a plinth dated to the 6th or 7th century.

West of Oshakan is a bridge dated to 1706 that crosses over the Kasagh River.

On a hilltop overlooking the town there is a Tukh Manuk Shrine with a large khachkar monument adjacent that sits within a large cemetery. The portion of the cemetery higher upon the hill is the older section while the lower portion contains a recent cemetery. There are Iron Age tomb fields around the area. Higher upon the same hill may be seen the shrine of Saint Grigor. Nearby are also the shrines of S. Sargis, S. Tadevos the Apostle, and a rock-cut Astvatsatsin.

The village of Oshakan is mentioned in a 13th-century inscription on the southern wall of the Katoghike Church of the Astvatsnkal Monastery built between the 5th and 13th centuries. It reads,

"By the grace and mercy of God, I Kurd, Prince of Princes, son of the great Vache, and my wife Khorishah, daughter of Marzpan, built the Holy Katoghike for the memory of our souls. We have decorated it with every kind of precious ornament and offered the garden bought by us in Parpi, virgin land in Oshakan, a garden in Karbi, a villager (?), and three hostels, in the year 693/AD 1244."

Oshakan is known to have had a brief visit during October 1734 by Abraham Kretatsi during the time while he was serving the Catholicos Abraham II. He wrote a short passage speaking of his previous days stay at Mughni to visit the Monastery of Surb Gevorg, "In the morning, after services, we went down to Oshakan."

== Historical and Architectural Monuments ==
=== Saint Mesrop Mashtots Church ===
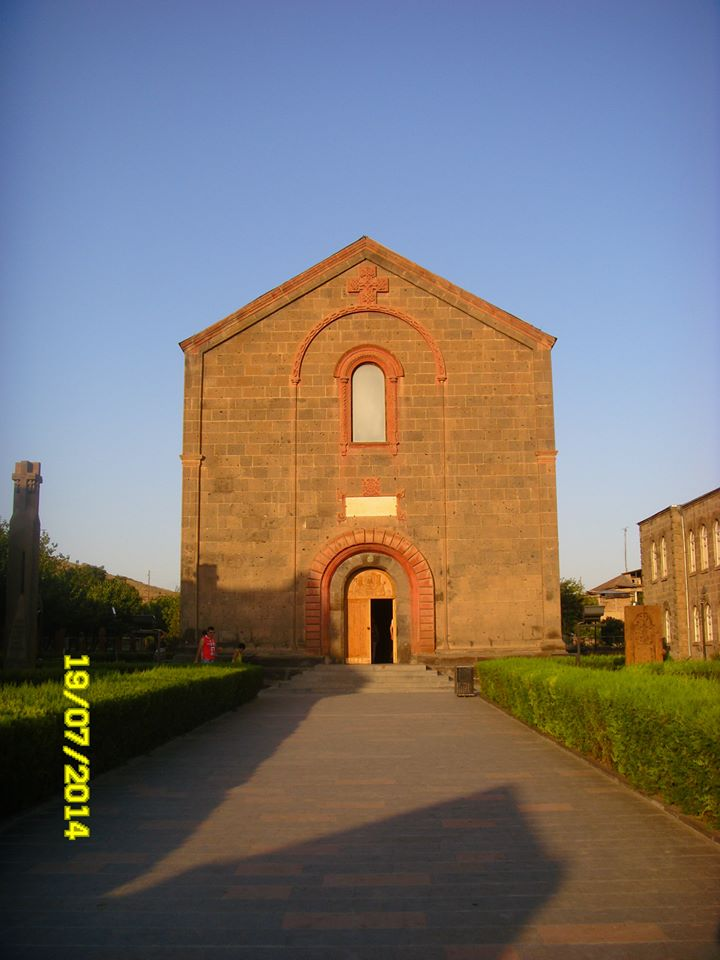
Mesrop Mashtots Church

The Saint Mesrop Mashtots Church is located in the village of Oshakan. After the death of Mesrop Mashtots, Vahan Amatuni, a military leader, and Hmayak Mamikonyan, a powerful noble, transported his remains to Oshakan. Three years later, in 443 AD, Vahan Amatuni built a chapel in his honor. To commemorate Mashtots' legacy, Catholicos Hovsep I Hoghotsmetsi instructed Koryun to write about the life and work of Mashtots. Between 1875 and 1879, Catholicos Gevorg IV replaced the old chapel with a new basilica-style church.

Oshakan is rich in archaeological monuments, with numerous ancient tombs discovered along the left bank of the Kasagh River. These tombs, constructed from large stones, provide valuable insights into the region's history.

=== Didi Kond ===
In the center of the village, excavations at Didi Kond Hill have revealed monuments from various historical periods. At the summit, archaeologists uncovered a 6th–5th century BC rectangular fortress, covering 0.25 hectares. Its exterior walls (2.5–2.65 meters thick) were built with large tuff stones and reinforced with clay mortar. The fortress interior, divided by a north-south partition wall, contains cellars and residential buildings.

On the northern slope and foothill of the hill, archaeologists discovered five palatial complexes from the 7th century BC. The first complex and part of the second, which includes 40 rooms, halls, and temples, have been excavated. Excavations have also yielded large quantities of pottery, stone and bone tools, ornaments, idols, and over 100 statues.

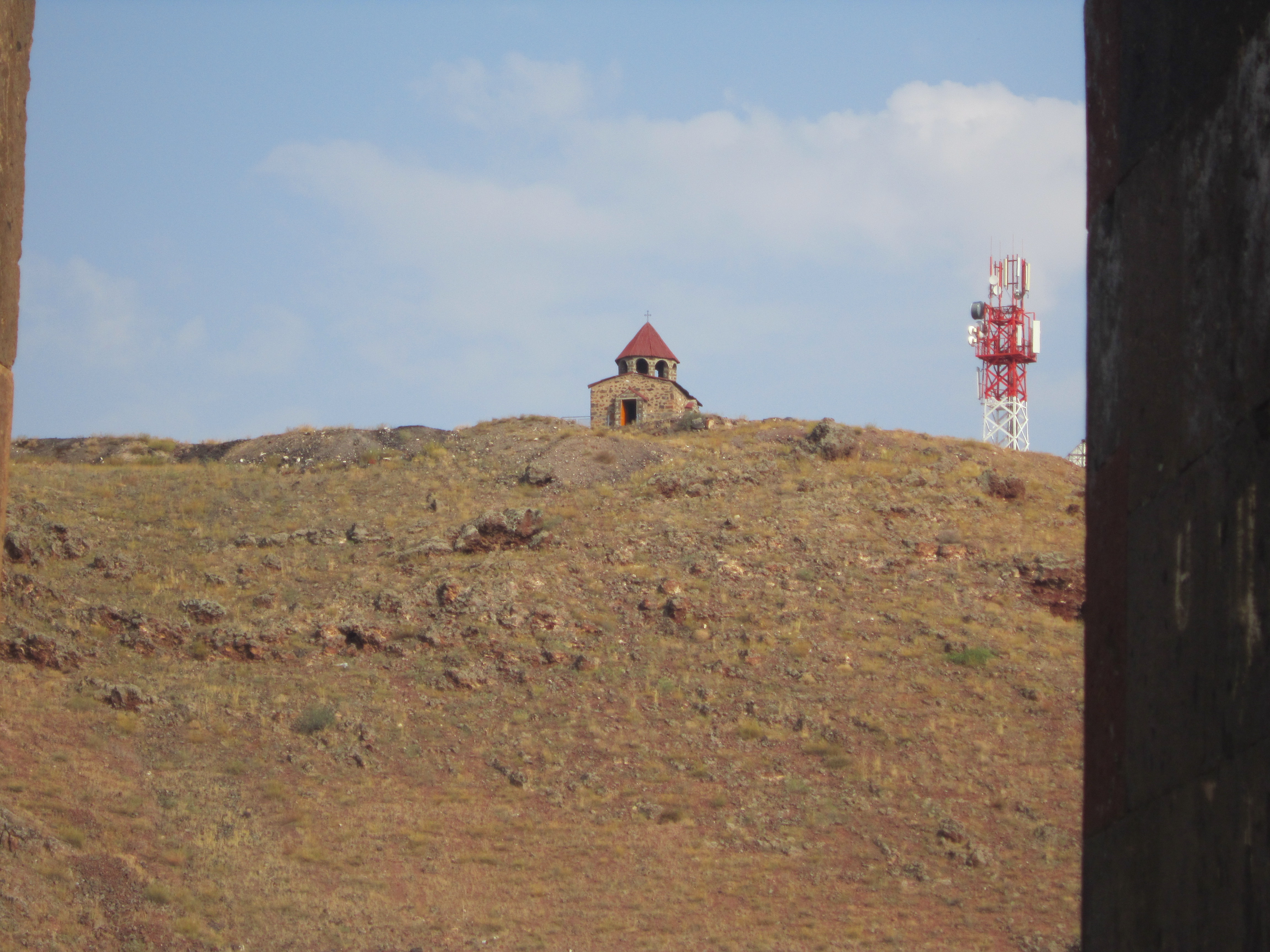
Didi Kond

On the ruins of these ancient complexes, an antique necropolis dating back to the 3rd century BC was uncovered, which remained in use until the 2nd century AD. The eastern, southern, and partially northern slopes of the hill contain more than 1,000 tombs from the Iron Age and Urartian period. Around 70 cromlechs, stone cist graves, and large burial chambers have been excavated. Archaeologists have found a large number of tools, weapons, gold, silver, and bronze jewelry, agate and carnelian beads, pottery, and wooden artifacts.

On the western slope of the hill, there is a medieval cemetery, with tombstones featuring inscriptions, bas-reliefs, and numerous khachkars (cross-stones). Many of these artifacts are now displayed in the History Museum of Armenia.

==== Saint Gregory Illuminator Chapel (Tukh Manuk) ====
At the top of Didi Kond Hill stands the Saint Gregory Illuminator Chapel, also known as Tukh Manuk. The famous Armenian architect Toros Toramanian, in his work Armenian Architecture, identified it as a 12th–14th-century structure. The chapel is located within the ancient fortress, leading scholars to believe that it was built on the site of an earlier pagan shrine.

Every year, on Kond's pilgrimage day (the Sunday following Easter), a religious ceremony is held at this site.

Other Monuments in Oshakan

- At the entrance to Oshakan, a monument commemorating the 1,600th anniversary of Mesrop Mashtots' birth was erected in 1962. It consists of two book-shaped slabs, with the Armenian alphabet carved on the left panel.
- Northeast of Oshakan, in the "Mankanots" area, stands the 7th-century Saint Sion Church.
- Oshakan is home to an early medieval unique monument (6th–7th centuries), traditionally believed to be the tombstone of Emperor Maurice or his mother.
- Around Oshakan and its surroundings are several historical churches and chapels, including Saint Thaddeus Apostle, Saint Gregory, Saint Sargis, the rock-cut Saint Astvatsatsin, and Tukh Manuk (13th century).

== Geography and Administrative Division ==
Oshakan is located in the Kasagh River valley at an altitude of 1,020 meters above sea level. The Kasagh River divides the village into two parts. Administratively, it borders the communities of Voskevaz, Ashtarak, Sasunik, and Dasht. Unofficially, Oshakan is divided into old and new districts.

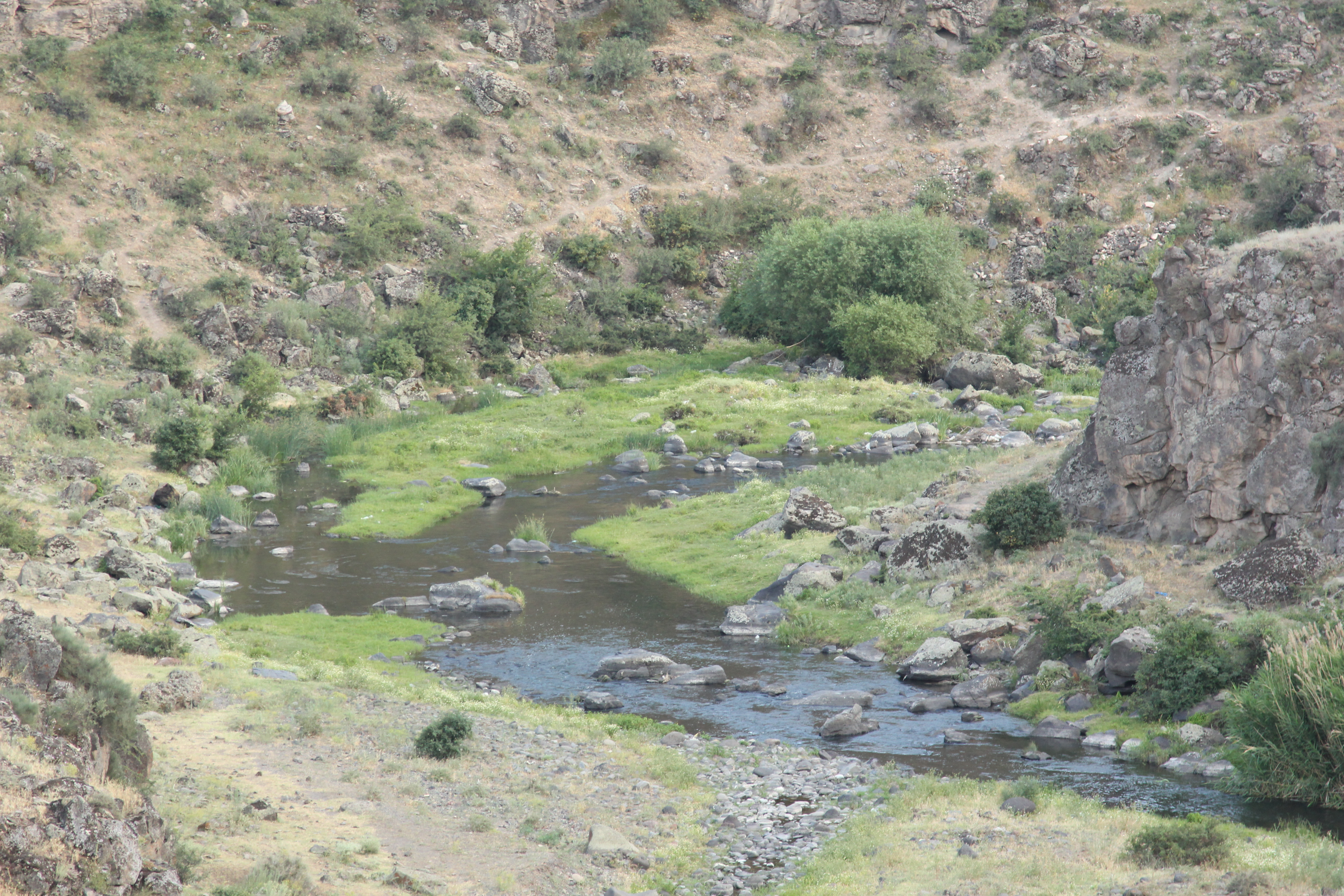
Kasakh River

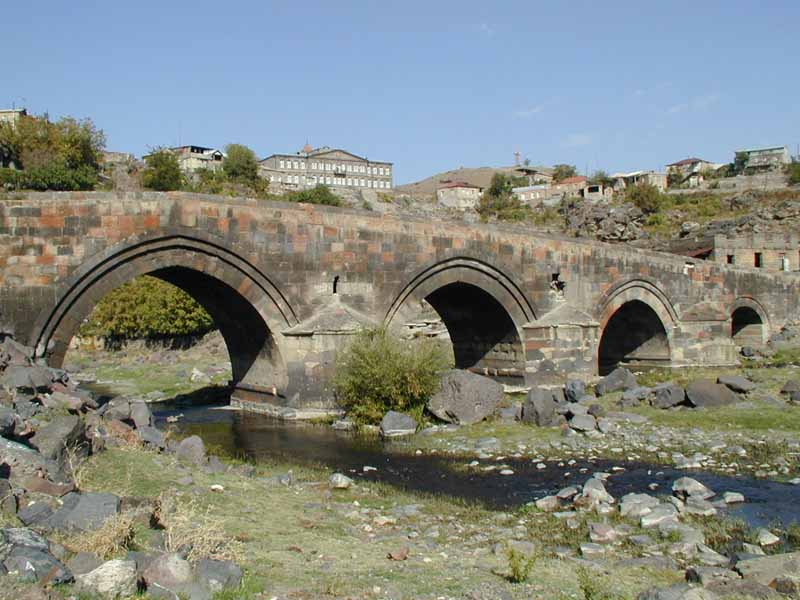
Oshakan Bridge

The old district includes the neighborhoods of Kheresi, Motsaki, Cholcholani, Dprotsi, Maturi, Voskevazi, Zhami, Karekali, Aregunik, Ttenut, Ghry, and Mankanots. The new district consists of Mesrop Mashtots, Vahan Amatuni, Misak Hovhannisyan, Aygestan, Hoktemberyan, and Mikayel Nalbandyan streets, as well as the neighborhood known as "Left Bank" (Dzakh Ap).

== Climate ==
Oshakan has a subtropical, dry continental climate with hot, arid summers and moderately cold winters. The average temperature in July ranges between 25–26°C, while in January, it drops to around -4°C. Annual precipitation is approximately 350 mm. Due to irrigation, the natural dry steppe landscapes have been transformed into cultivated and irrigated lands.

The village is also home to the Didikond hill, which was formed by lava formations.

== Notable people of Oshakan ==
Paylak Babkenyan (1970–1994) was an Armenian fighter in the First Nagorno-Karabakh War. The primary school in Oshakan is named in his honor.

Artur Oshakantsi (born 1953, Oshakan) studied at the Art Department of Yerevan State Pedagogical University from 1972 to 1976. In 2003, he was recognized by the Metropolitan Museum of Art as the founder of abstract naturalism in art history. He has participated in numerous group exhibitions and has held several solo exhibitions. Artur Oshakantsi’s works are housed in galleries and museums in various countries, as well as in private collections.

Hovak Galoyan Sr. – Armenian actor, People's Artist, known for films such as Dzori Miro, Sayat Nova, and others. The theatrical troupe of the Oshakan Palace of Culture is named after him.

Hovak Galoyan Jr. – Armenian actor, known for roles in TV series such as Masquerade (as Arman), Difficult Life (as Frunz Sevakich), and others.

Vahan Amatuni (born 1957) – Armenian journalist and photographer, member of the Journalists' Union of the USSR and Armenia.

Sahak Amatuni (born Baghdasar Baghdasaryan, 1856–1917) – Armenian lexicographer and member of the Etchmiadzin Brotherhood.

== Sister cities ==
- Alfortville, France

== Gallery ==
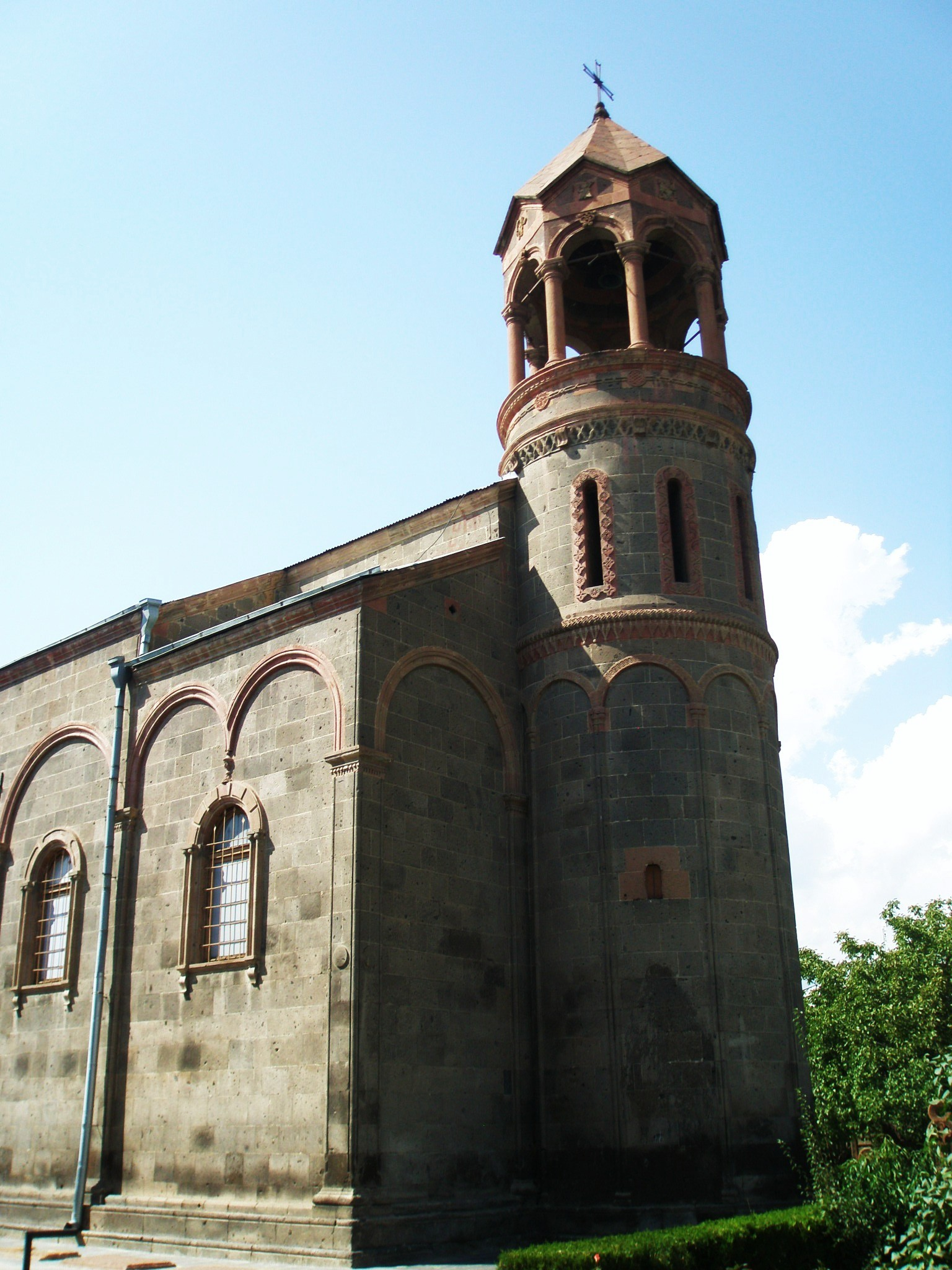
Saint Mesrop Mashtots Cathedral built in 1875-79

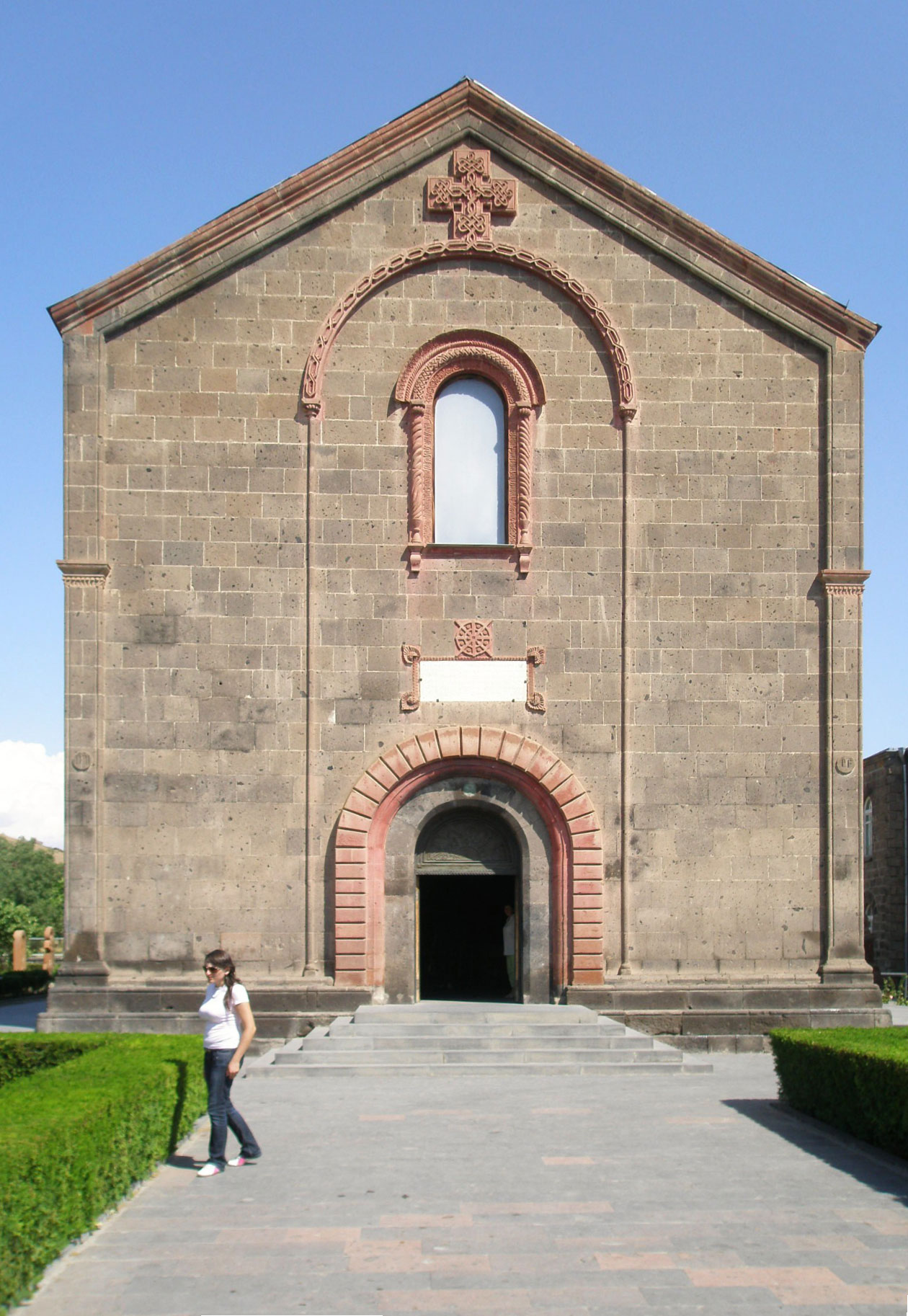
The front facade of the Saint Mesrop Mashtots Cathedral

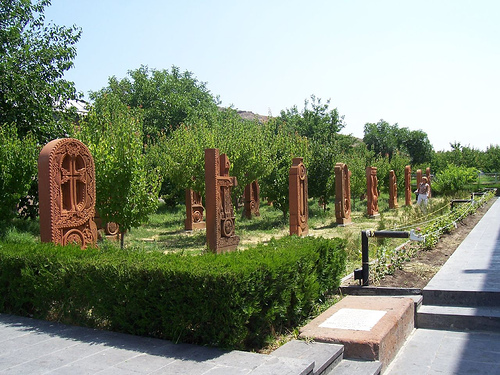
Armenian Alphabet khachkars in the Saint Mesrop Cathedral yard

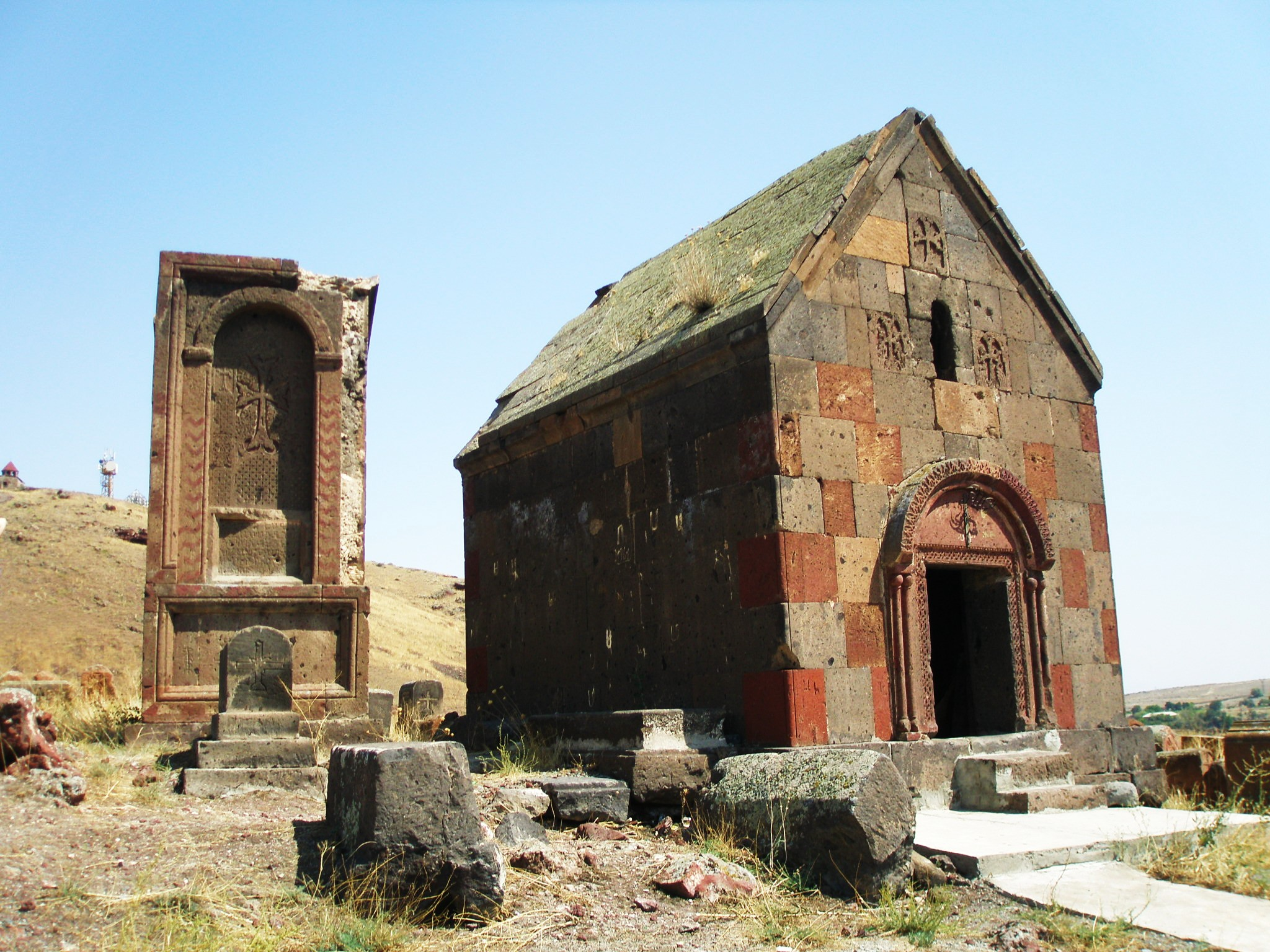
Tukh Manuk shrine with a large khachkar adjacent, the Surp Grigor Chapel is also seen in the background

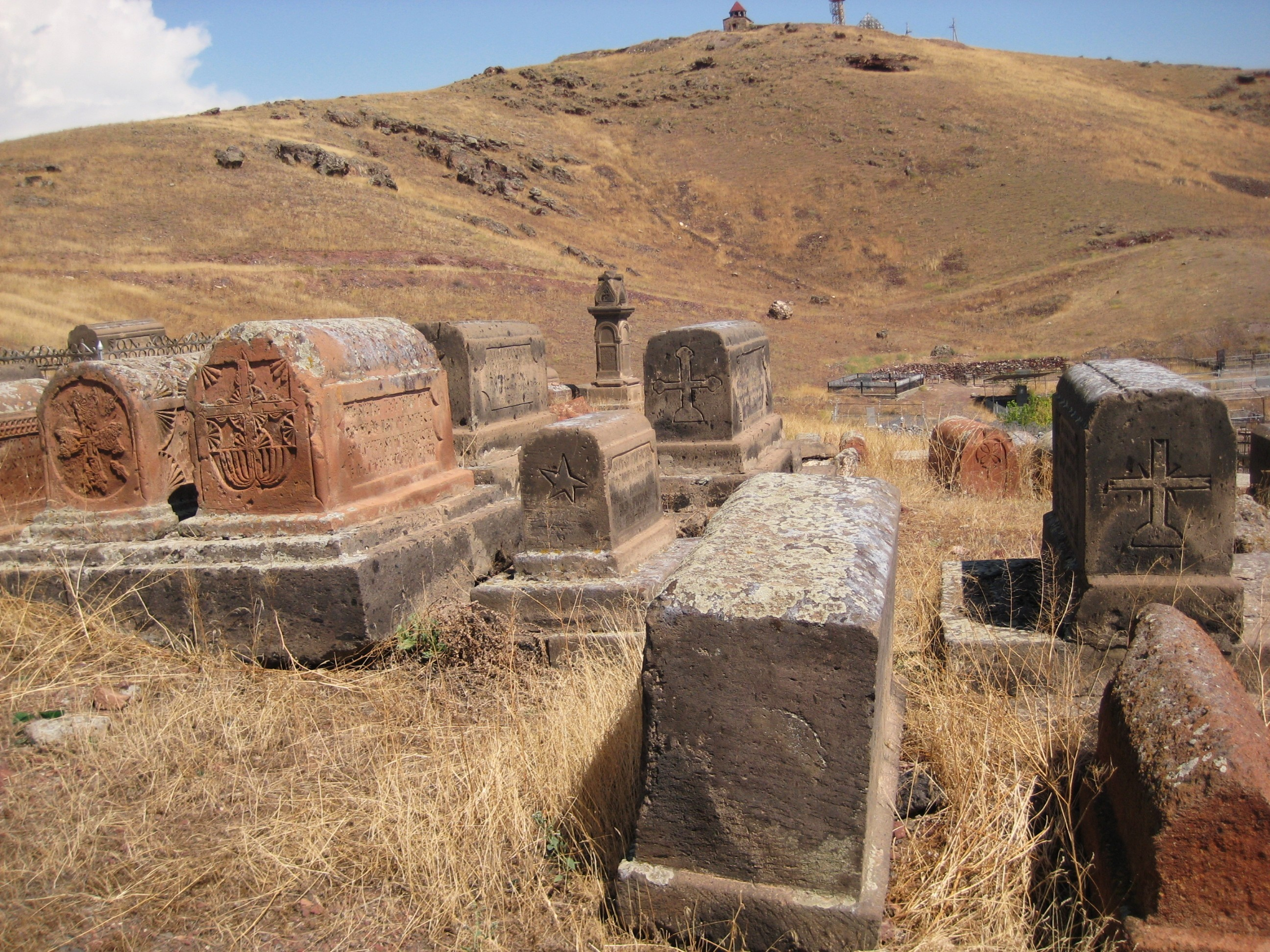
Cemetery below Didi Kond Hill with the shrine of Surb Grigor in the background

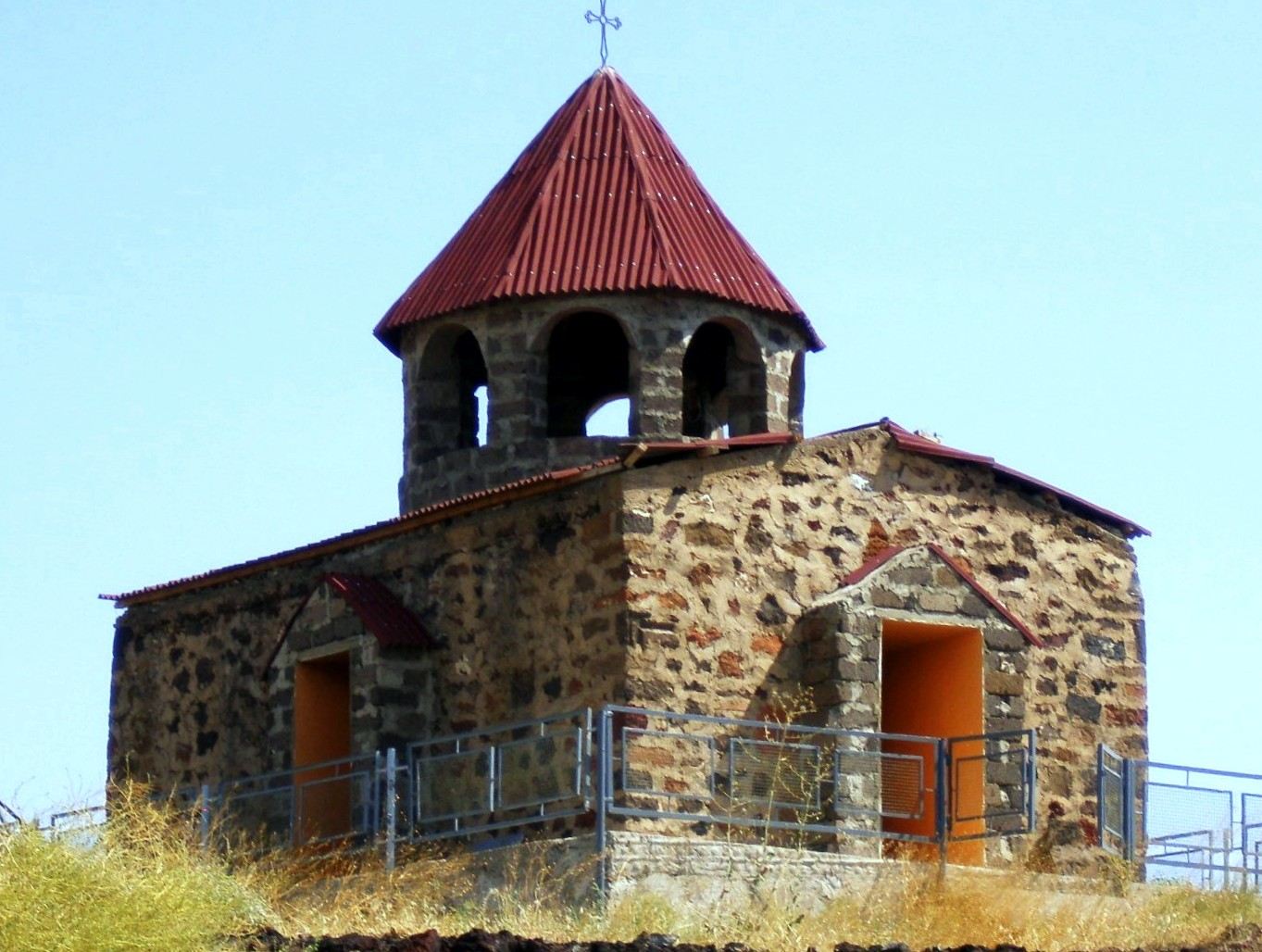
The shrine of Surp Grigor on the Didi Kond Hill overlooking the village

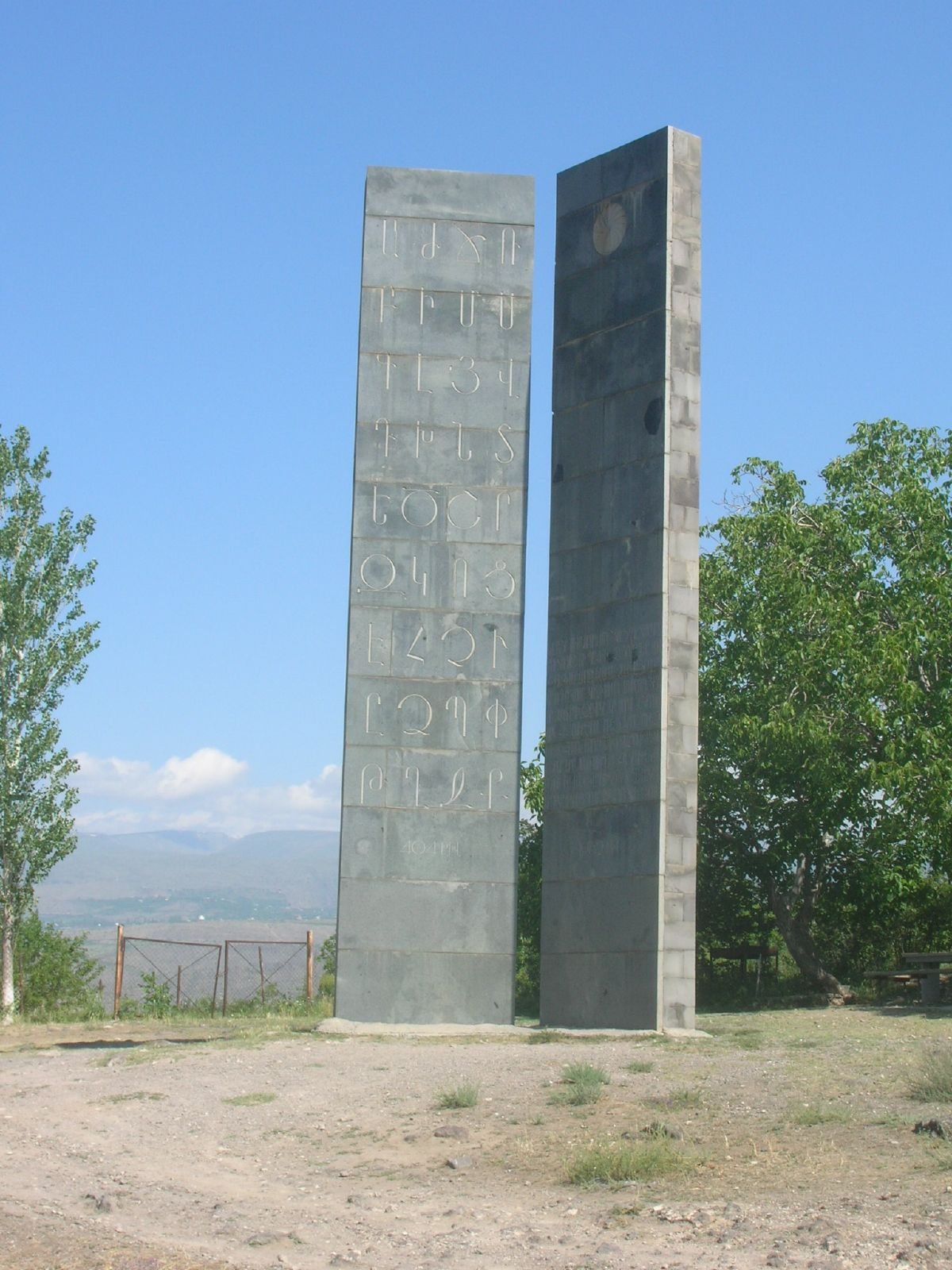
The Armenian alphabet memorial in Oshakan

== See also ==
- Aragatsotn Province
