= Parpi =

Parpi Փարպի
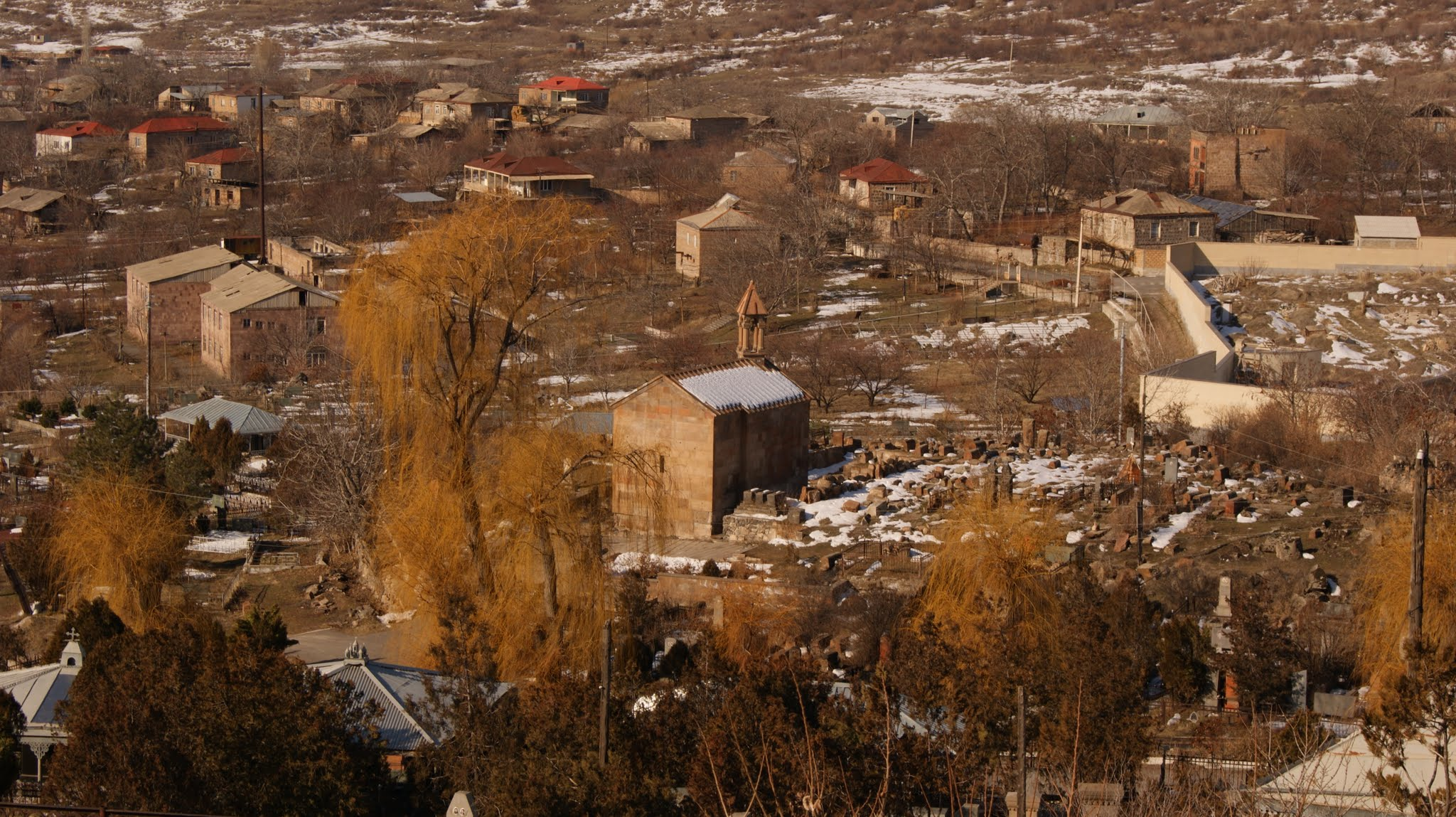
- S. Grigor Lusavorich Church in Parpi

- Location within Armenia Location within Aragatsotn
- Coordinates: 40°19′46″N 44°18′26″E
- Country: Armenia
- Province: Aragatsotn
- Municipality: Ashtarak

Population (2011)
  - Total: 1,970
- Time zone: UTC+4
  - Summer (DST): UTC+5
- Website: Parpi: official website

Parpi (Armenian: Փարպի) is a village in the Ashtarak Municipality of the Aragatsotn Province of Armenia. It is home to the 5th-century Tsiranavor Church, with 7th- and 10th-century modifications. There is also S. Grigor or S. Grigor Lusavorich (Gregory the Illuminator) Church and the 7th-century (rebuilt 10th-11th century) Targmanchats (Holy Translator) Church located in a medieval-modern cemetery on a hill to the east. Nearby is a cave with a working door, used as a place of refuge between the 16th and 18th centuries.

== History ==
The 5th- to 6th-century Armenian chronicler and historian Ghazar Parpetsi was born at Parpi in AD 442. He is recognized for writing History of Armenia, sometime in the early 6th century. Parpi is known to have had a brief visit during October 1734 by Abraham Kretatsi during the time while he was serving the Catholicos Abraham II. He wrote:

The next day, at my request, we went to Parpi and from there to Karbi, where we spent the night at the residences of Paron Khachatur and Paron Ohazar. The next day we traveled to Mughni to visit the Church of St. Gregory. Melik Hakobjan, who accompanied us, was not feeling well and we stayed the night there. In the morning, after services, we went down to Oshakan. The melik went to Yerevan via Yeghvard, but we stayed the night there. We left at dawn and arrived at Holy Echmiadzin.

The village is also mentioned in a 13th-century inscription on the southern wall of the Katoghike Church of the Astvatsnkal Monastery built between the 5th and 13th centuries in the village of Hartavan. It reads as follows:

By the grace and mercy of God, I Kurd, Prince of Princes, son of the great Vache, and my wife Khorishah, daughter of Marzpan, built the Holy Katoghike for the memory of our souls. We have decorated it with every kind of precious ornament and offered the garden bought by us in Parpi, virgin land in Oshakan, a garden in Karbi, a villager (?), and three hostels, in the year 693/AD 1244.

== Notable people ==
- Nazar Albaryan, was an Armenian wrestler.

== Gallery ==
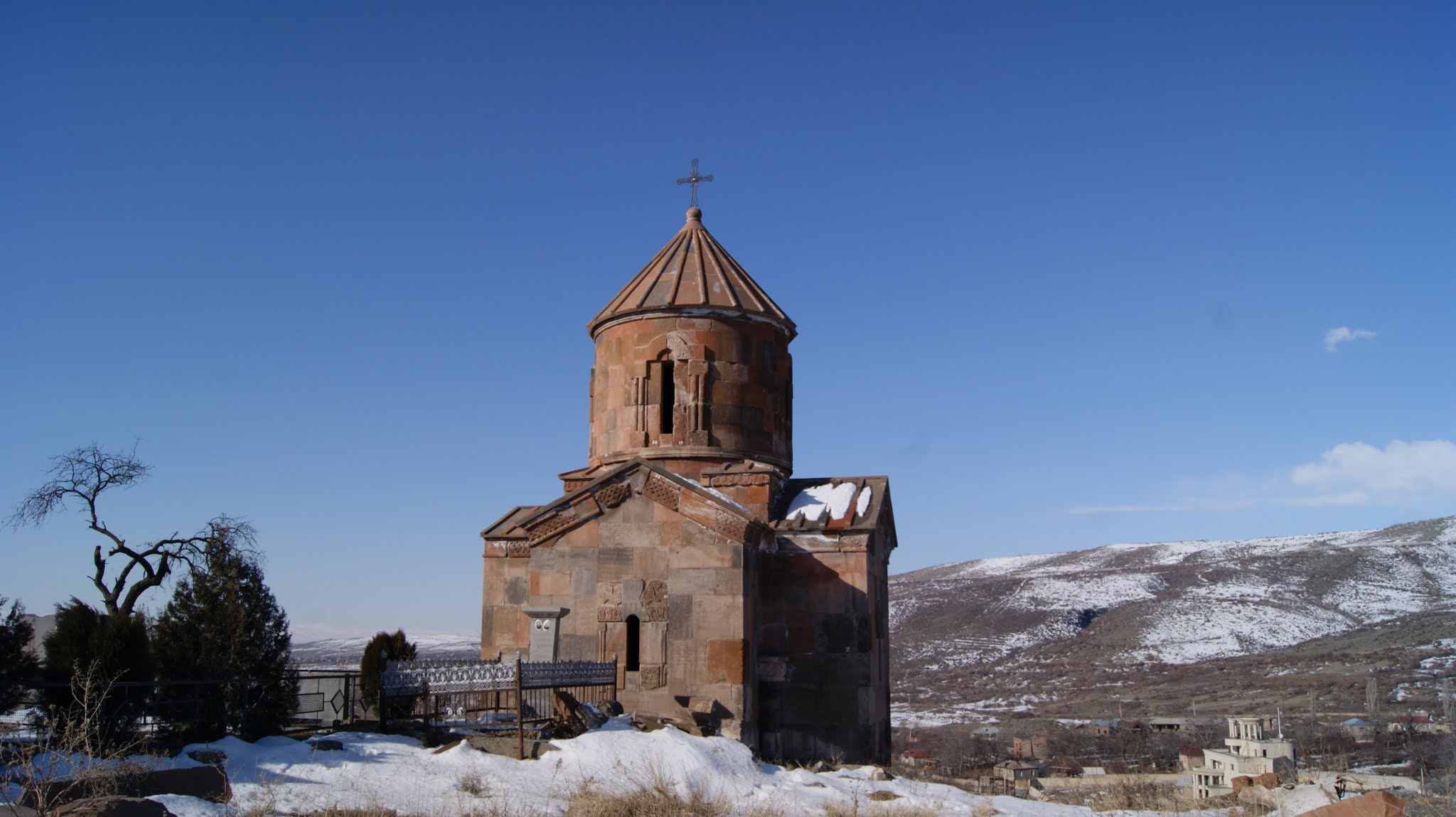
Targmanchats Church, 7th century

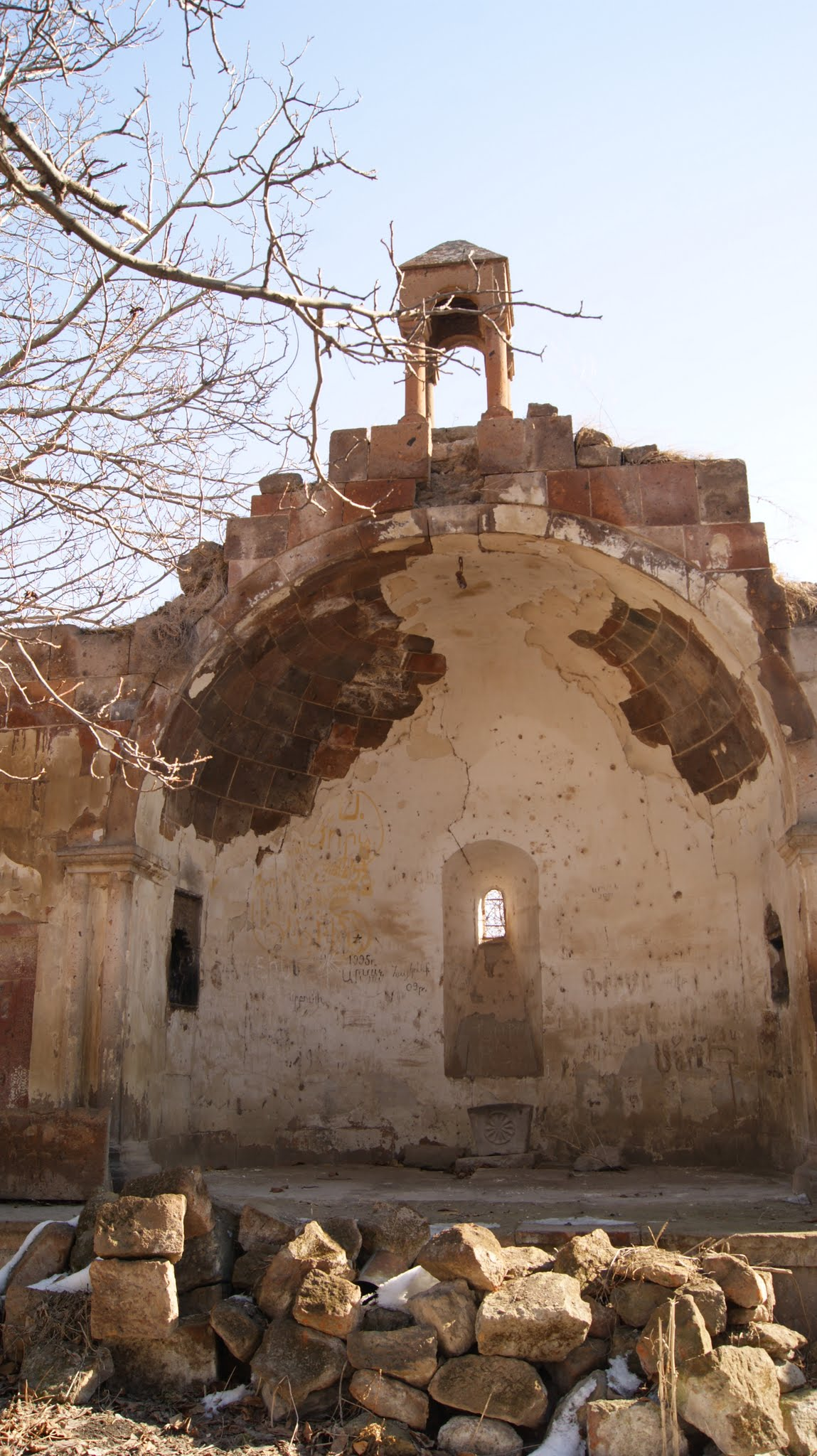
Tsiranavor Church, 5th century

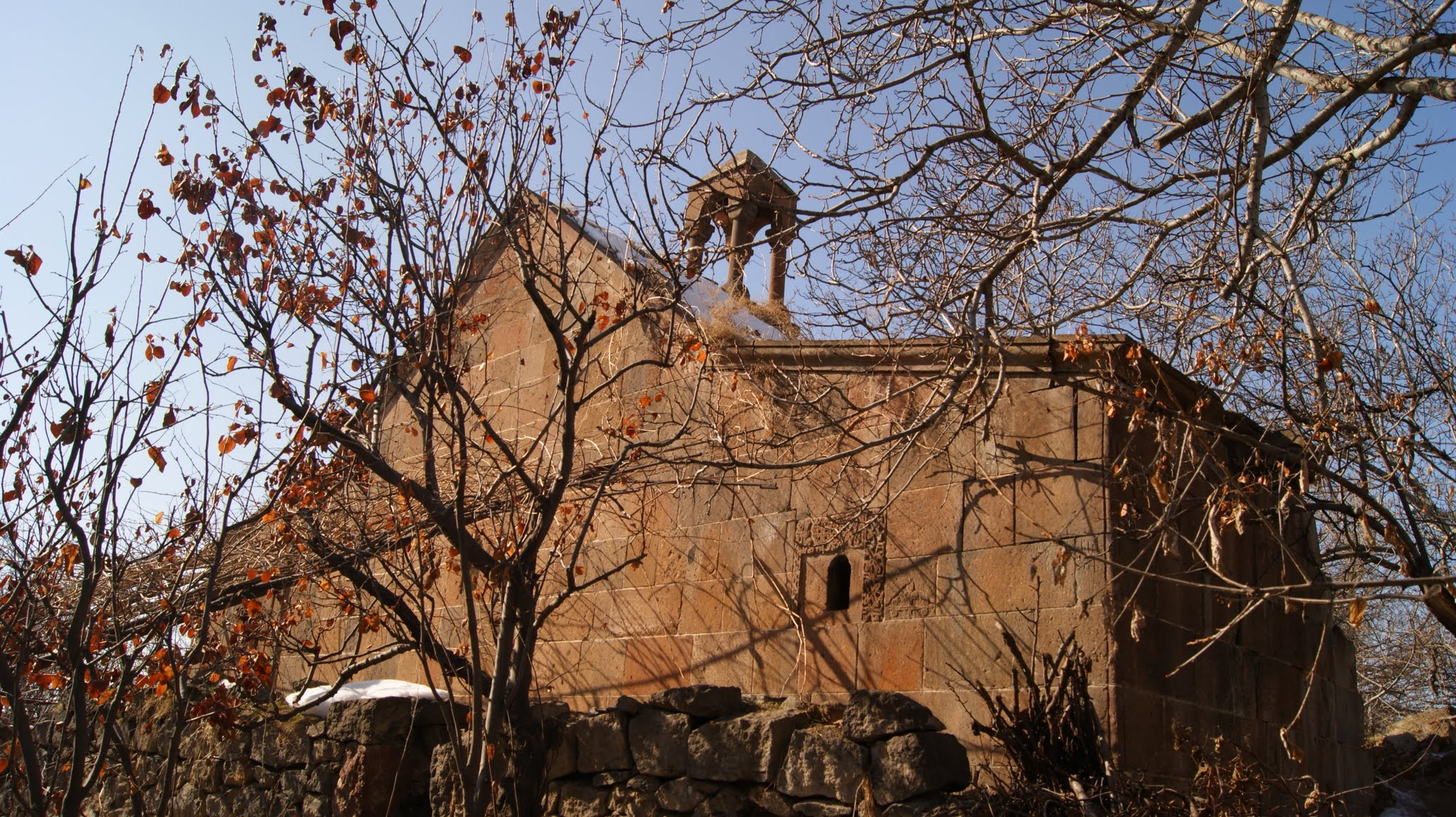
Tsiranavor Church, 5th century

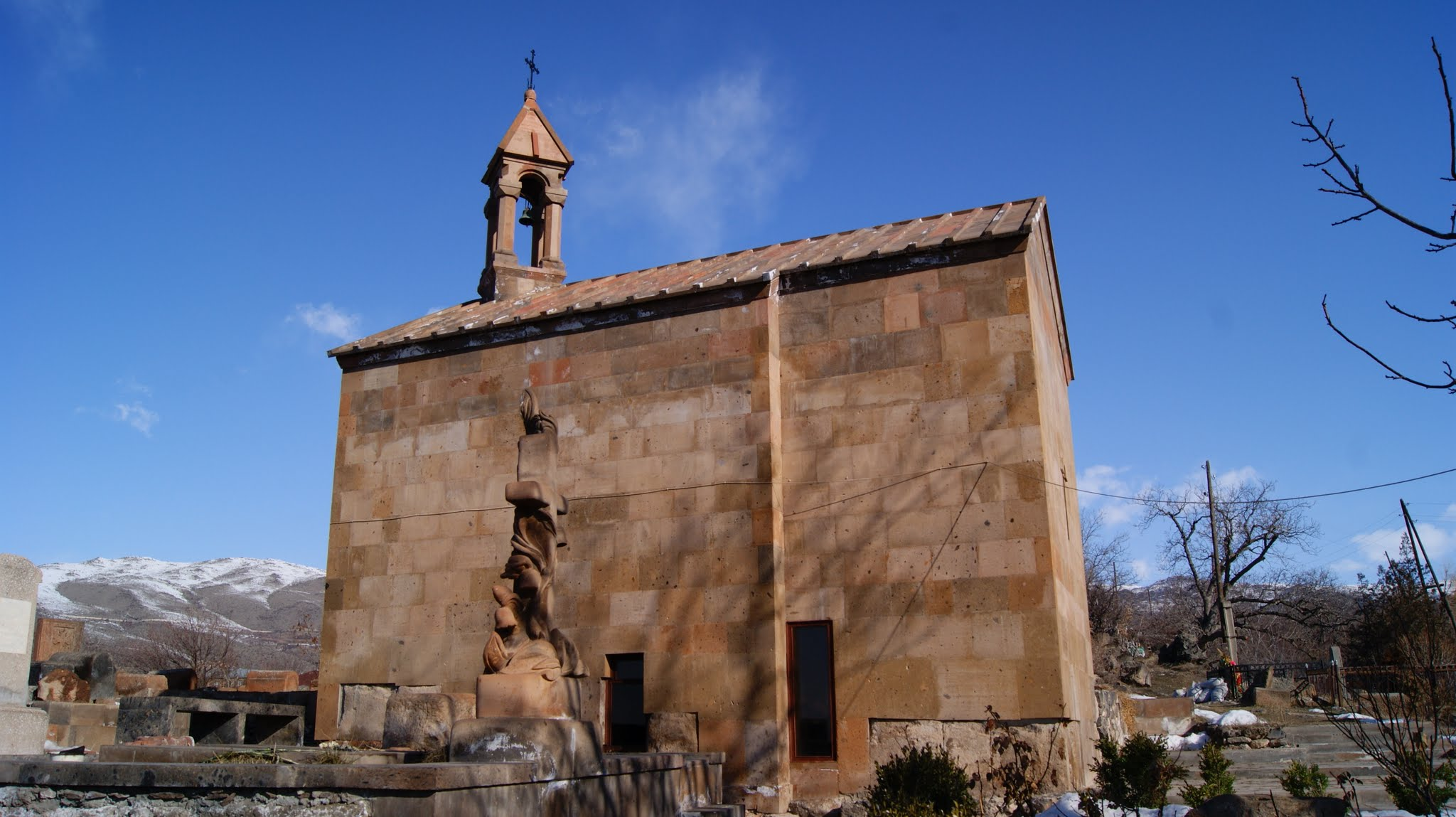
S. Grigor Lusavorich Church

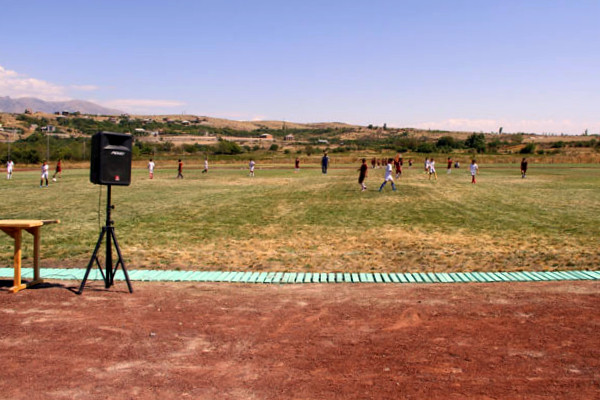
Parpi Stadium opened in 2013

== See also ==
- Aragatsotn Province
