= Tukh Manuk Shrine of Oshakan =

In Aragatsotn Province, Armenia

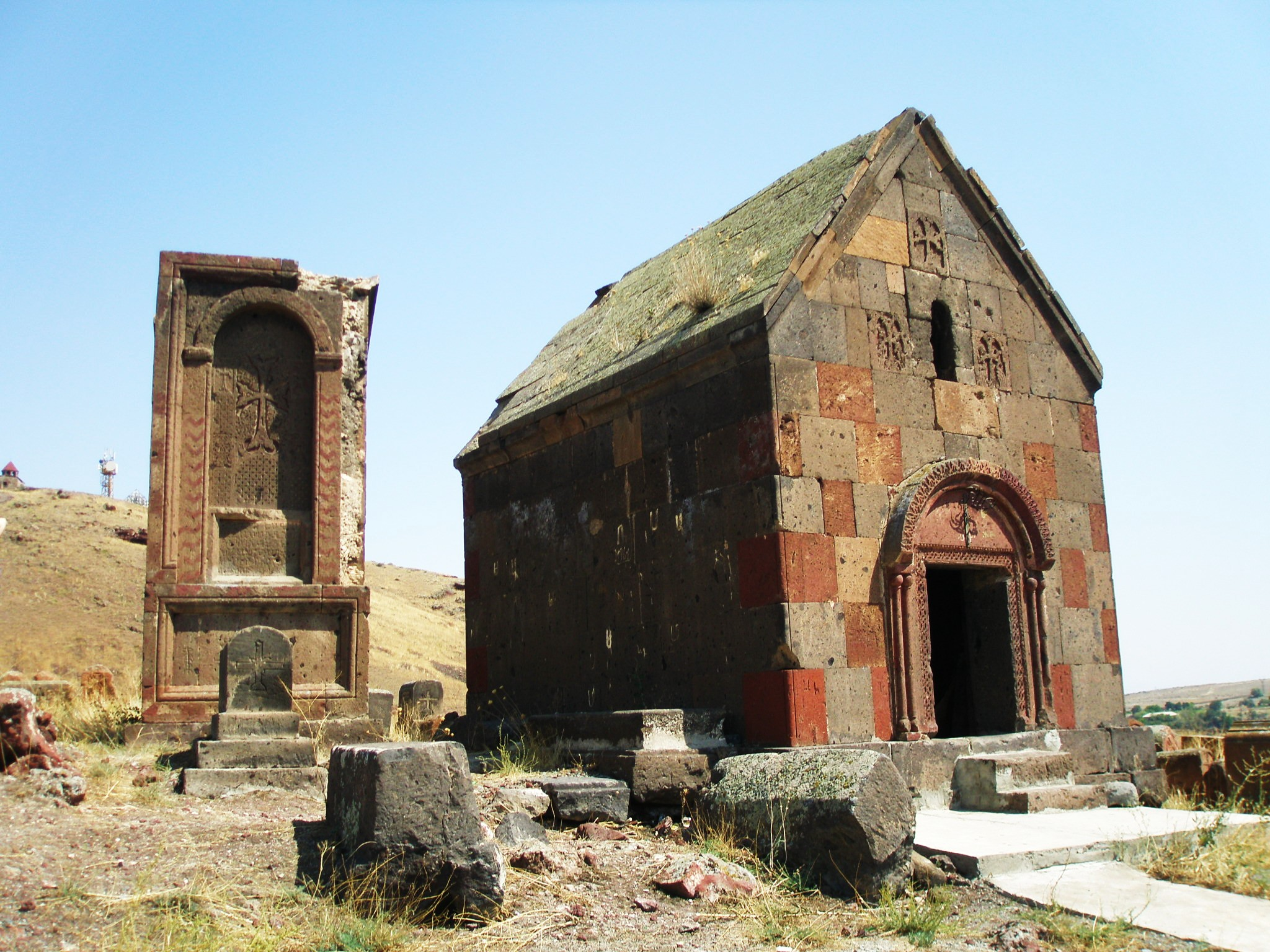
Tukh Manuk shrine atop of a hill cemetery in the village of Oshakan (In the background on the far upper left can be seen the Shrine of S. Grigor).

The Tukh Manuk Shrine of Oshakan is located in the town of Oshakan in Aragatsotn Marz, Armenia. Tukh Manuk literally translates to "dark baby" or "dark-skinned youth."
