= Lazar I of Armenia =

Catholicos Lazar I of Armenia was the Catholicos of the Armenian Apostolic Church between 1737 and 1751. He is notable for the numerous troubles he personally got into during his reign.

Lazar had been bishop of Smyrna, Turkey and was a native of Jahuk. He was said to be beloved by his nation and many wanted him to be the Catholicos when Abraham III died, though another party supported Gregory the Armenian Patriarch of Jerusalem. Lazar's supporters were more numerous and upon his election Lazar left Smyrna and made a grand procession to Erzurum, where the bishop received him. The governor there however detained him for a time until suddenly dying, an event blamed on divine wrath directed by Lazar. Lazar in turn blamed the bishop and was allowed to leave, escaping to Kars. Meanwhile, word arrived in Erzurum that the sultan demanded Lazar's arrest as he had not applied to the sultan for proper approval of letters patent for his election. Lazar was notified of the danger and he fled to Persia before making it to Etchmiadzin. A few years later Lazar came into conflict with the prince of Persia and was almost executed for it but escaped by paying a large fine. Another time, the Persian vizier who also did not like Lazar convinced the shah that Lazar was a problem. The shah summoned Lazar to see him and grew angry at him, having the Catholicos's grand tent destroyed. He had Lazar dragged before him and to be beaten severely. He was led to prison and kept for five months until he paid the required fine.

Sometime after his return, Lazar had a rival monk Peter Kytheur persecuted and tortured, until he was finally able to leave for refuge in Karin. From there the monk wrote about his torture to many Armenian churches and many people began to complain about Lazar. The governor of Erevan was asked to intervene and so he gathered the Armenian clergy and asked them to decide on the matter. The clergy said they did not want Lazar, so he was arrested and taken to Sevanavank. Peter Kytheur was anointed the new Catholicos in his place, who then excommunicated Lazar. Lazar had a group of supporters who agitated for his release, and around this time Ebrahim Afshar became the new shah of Persian. Lazar's supporters got the shah to have Lazar released from prison and not long after (some say thanks to bribes to the shah) he had Lazar restored as Catholicos. Peter Kytheur was fettered and thrown in a dungeon where he would die of starvation after being Catholicos for ten months, though his name is not included on the Wikipedia official list. Lazar died three years after his restoration.

Preceded by Abraham III of Armenia	Catholicos of the Holy See of St. Echmiadzin and All Armenians; 1737–1751	Succeeded by Minas I of Armenia
