= Karapet II of Armenia =

Catholicos Karapet II Oolnetzi (also Catholicos Garabed II Oolnetzi) (Armenian: Կարապետ Բ Ուլնեցի) was the Catholicos of the Armenian Apostolic Church between 1726 and 1729.

Because of grave political and military situation in Armenia, it was not possible to elect a new Catholicos of All Armenians in Etchmiadzin following death of Catholicos Asdvadzadur I of Armenia (in Armenian Աստվածատուր Ա Համադանցի). For that reason the Armenian Patriarch of Constantinople Hovhannes IX (in Armenian Հովհաննես Կոլոտ Բաղիշեցի) organized an election in Constantinople and Garabed Oolnetzi was elected as Garabed II, Catholicos of All Armenians and he was consecrated on 27 February 1726 in the Mother of God church in Constantinople. He was seen by the Ottoman leaders as a trusted bridge to establish favorable relations with the new Ottoman administration of Eastern Armenia. The ordained catholicos, military situation permitting, left Constantinople (present day Istanbul) in June 1727 on his way to Etchmiadzin on the way visiting many Armenian churches in the eastern provinces of the Ottoman Empire. He arrived in Etchmiadzin, the official seat of the Catholicos of all Armenians beginning of the year 1728. He died after actually serving a year and few months. He was buried in 1729 at St. Hripsime Church, Echmiadzin.

Catholicos Abraham II of Armenia (in Armenian Աբրահամ Բ Խոշաբեցի) was elected Catholicos of All Armenians in 1730 serving until 1734.

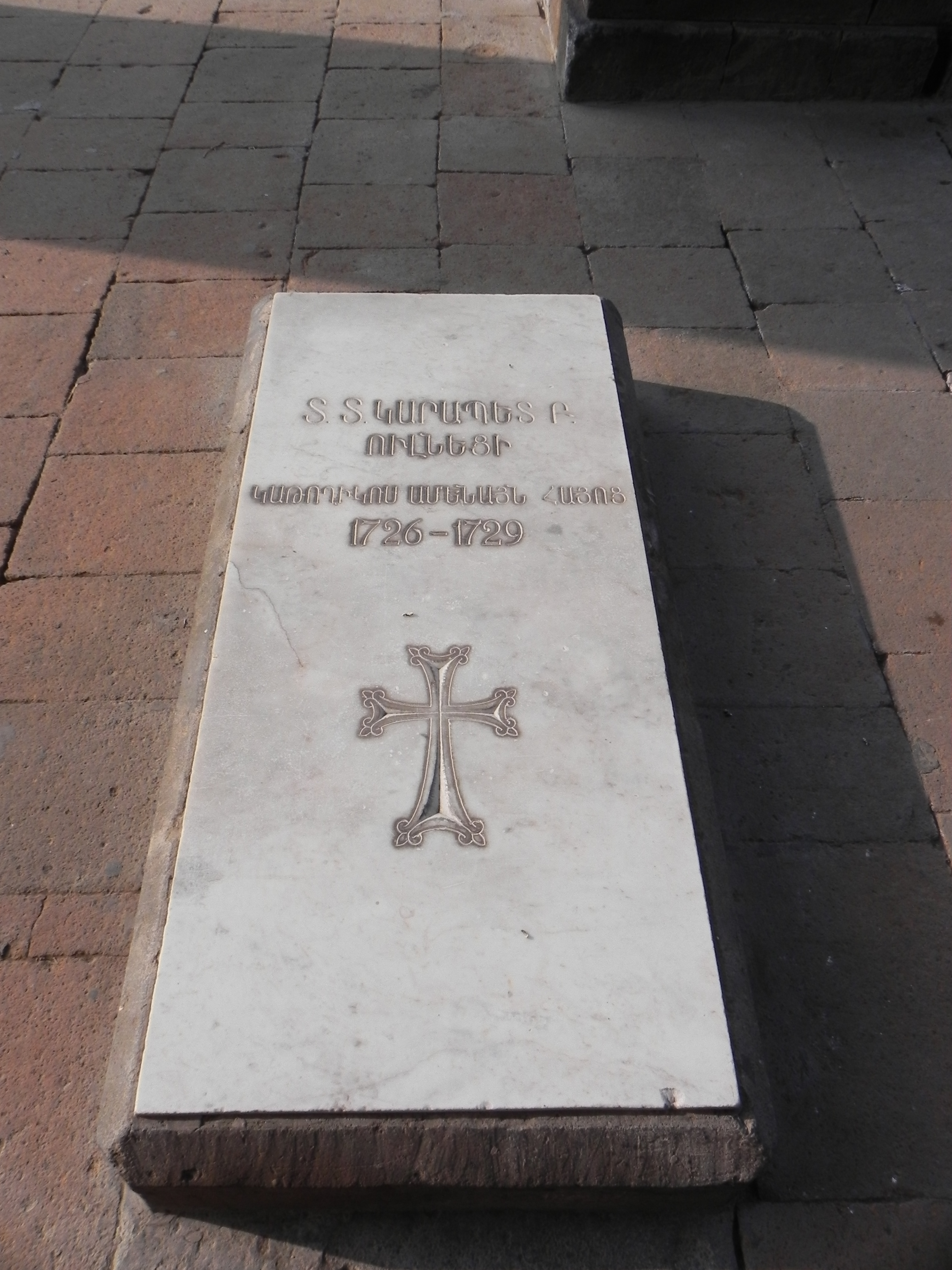
Tombstone of Garabed II, Catholicos of All Armenians, at St. Hripsime church

Preceded by Asdvadzadur I of Armenia	Catholicos of the Holy See of St. Echmiadzin and All Armenians; 1726–1729	Succeeded by Abraham II of Armenia
