= Surp Astvatsatsin Church of Karbi =

Cultural heritage monument of Armenia

Surp Astvatsatsin Church Սուրբ Աստվածածին եկեղեցի
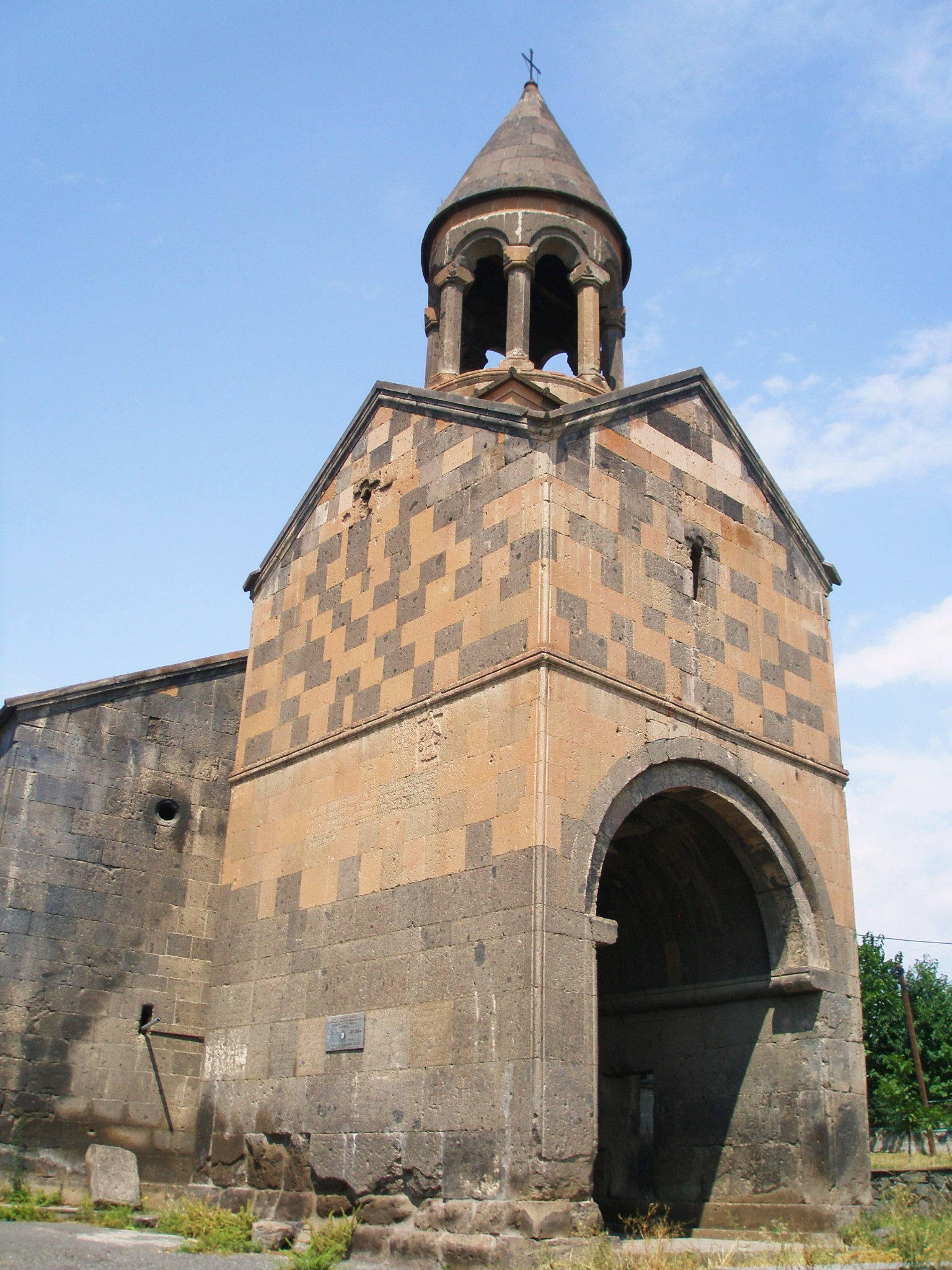
- The belfry of S. Astvatsatsin at Karbi, September 2009.

- Location within Armenia Location within Aragatsotn

Religion
- Affiliation: Armenian Apostolic Church

Location
- Location: Karbi, Aragatsotn Province, Armenia
- Coordinates: 40.331981°N 44.376405°E

Architecture
- Type: Triple-nave Basilica; rectangular plan outside
- Style: Armenian
- Completed: Church: 1691-1693; belfry: 1338
- Domes: 0 domes; 1 cupola centered above the basilica; 1 belfry in front

The church of Surp Astvatsatsin (Armenian: Սուրբ Աստվածածին; meaning Holy Mother of God) is located just off the main highway through the village of Karbi in the Aragatsotn Province of Armenia. The basilica was completed between the years of 1691–1693, while the belfry was built earlier in 1338.

== Architecture ==
S. Astvatsatsin is a triple-nave basilica, with a single gable roof covering the entire body of the structure and a small off-centered cupola. Several large khachkars are embedded into the exterior walls of the church. A large two-storey belfry is situated in front of the eastern end of the church. The belfry is a separate structure from the basilica. It has a large archway that serves as the support for the upper cupola. The cupola is supported by eight columns and has a conical dome above.

== Gallery ==
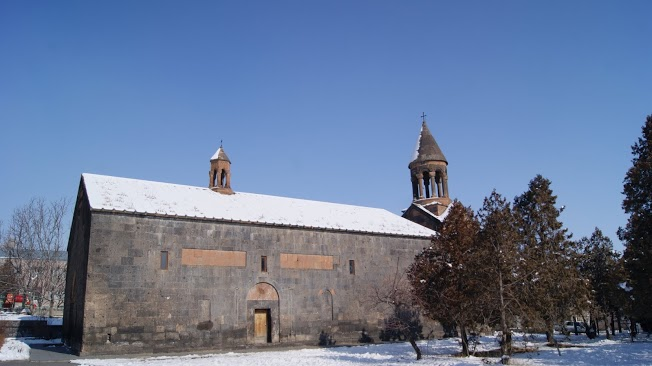
S. Astvatsatsin Church and belfry

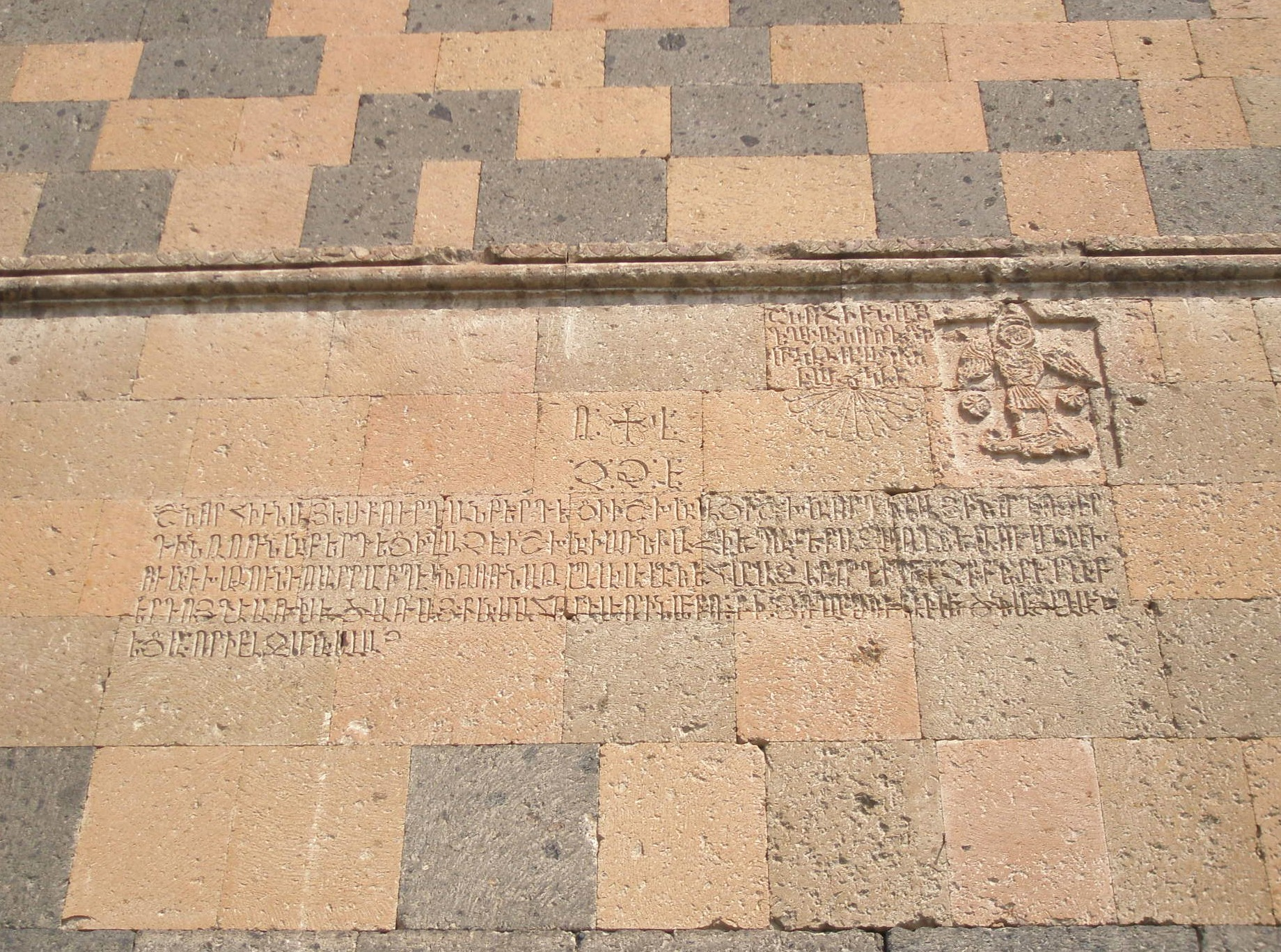
Belfry inscription (at the midsection of the wall)

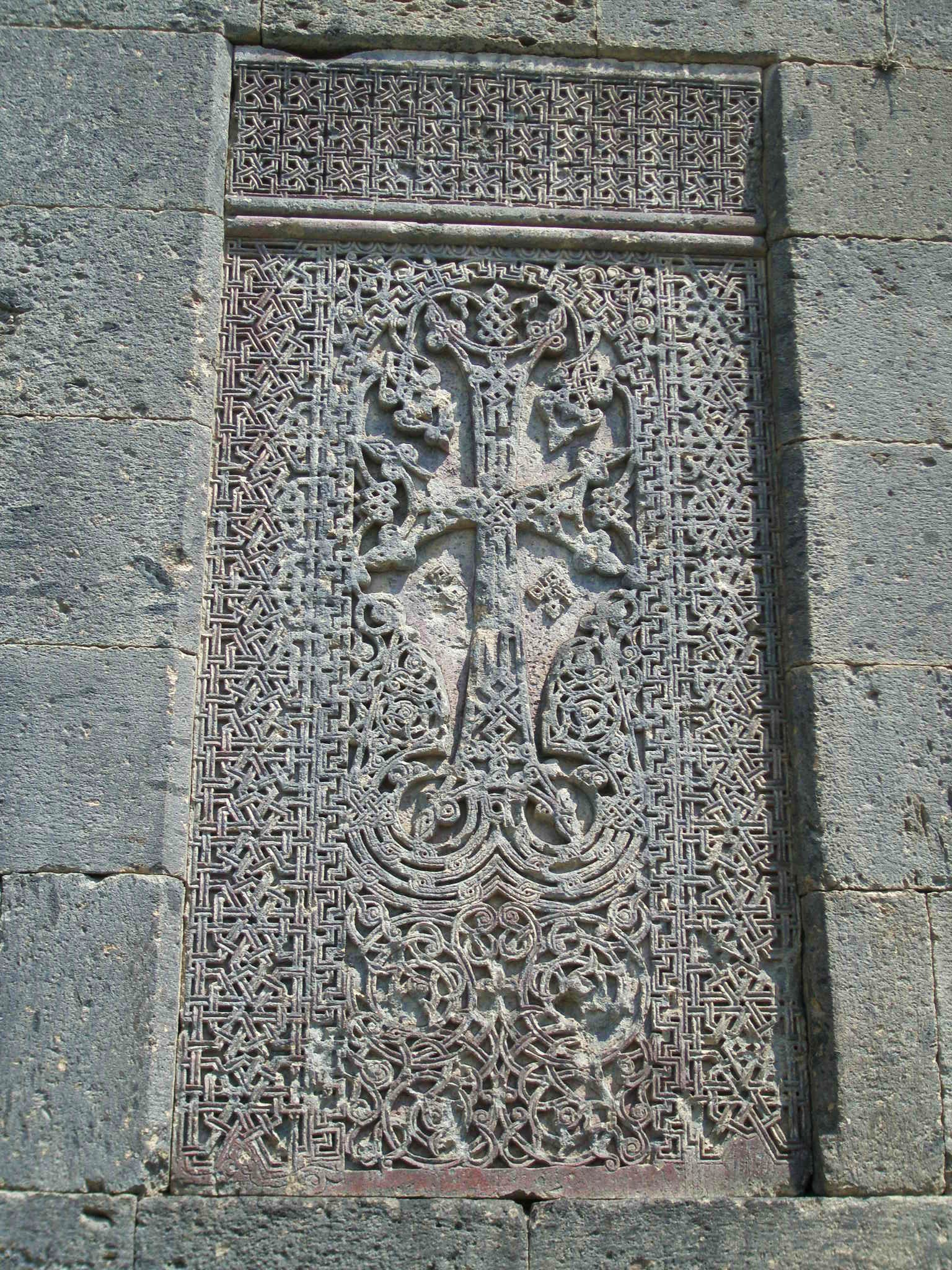
Khachkar embedded into the wall of S. Astvatsatsin

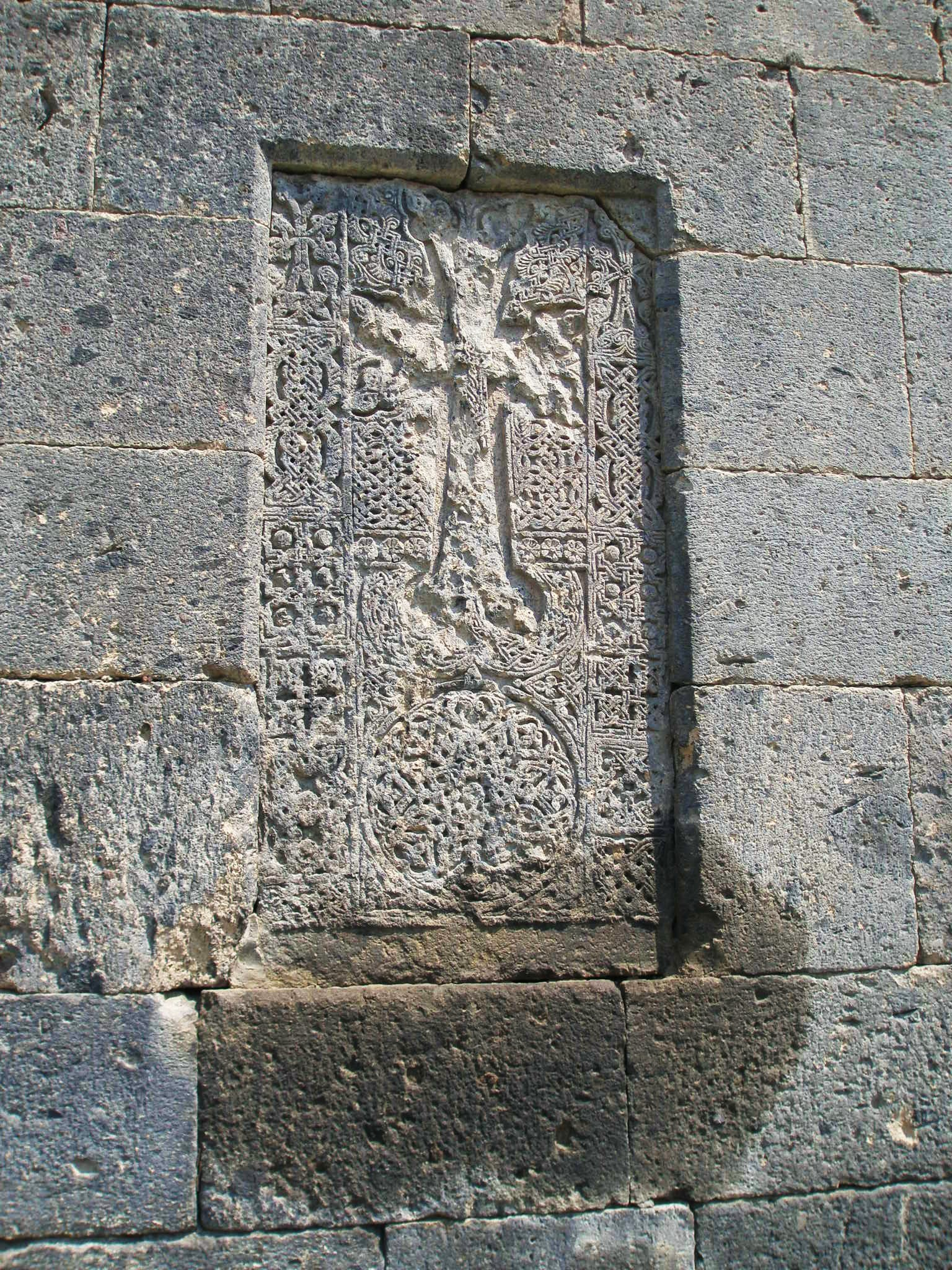
Another khachkar

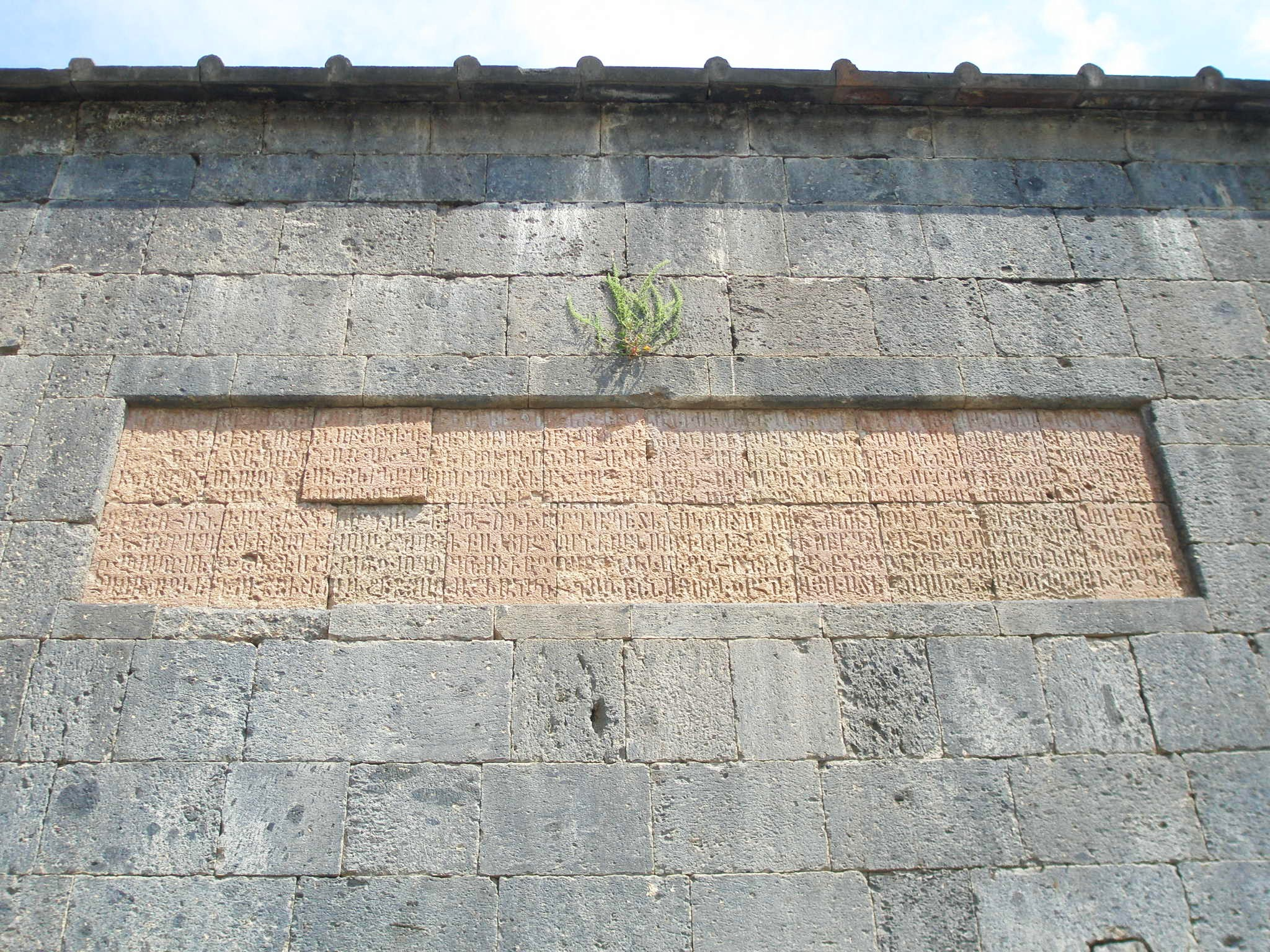
Inscription built into the upper walls of the church exterior
