= Tukh Manuk =

Armenian shrines

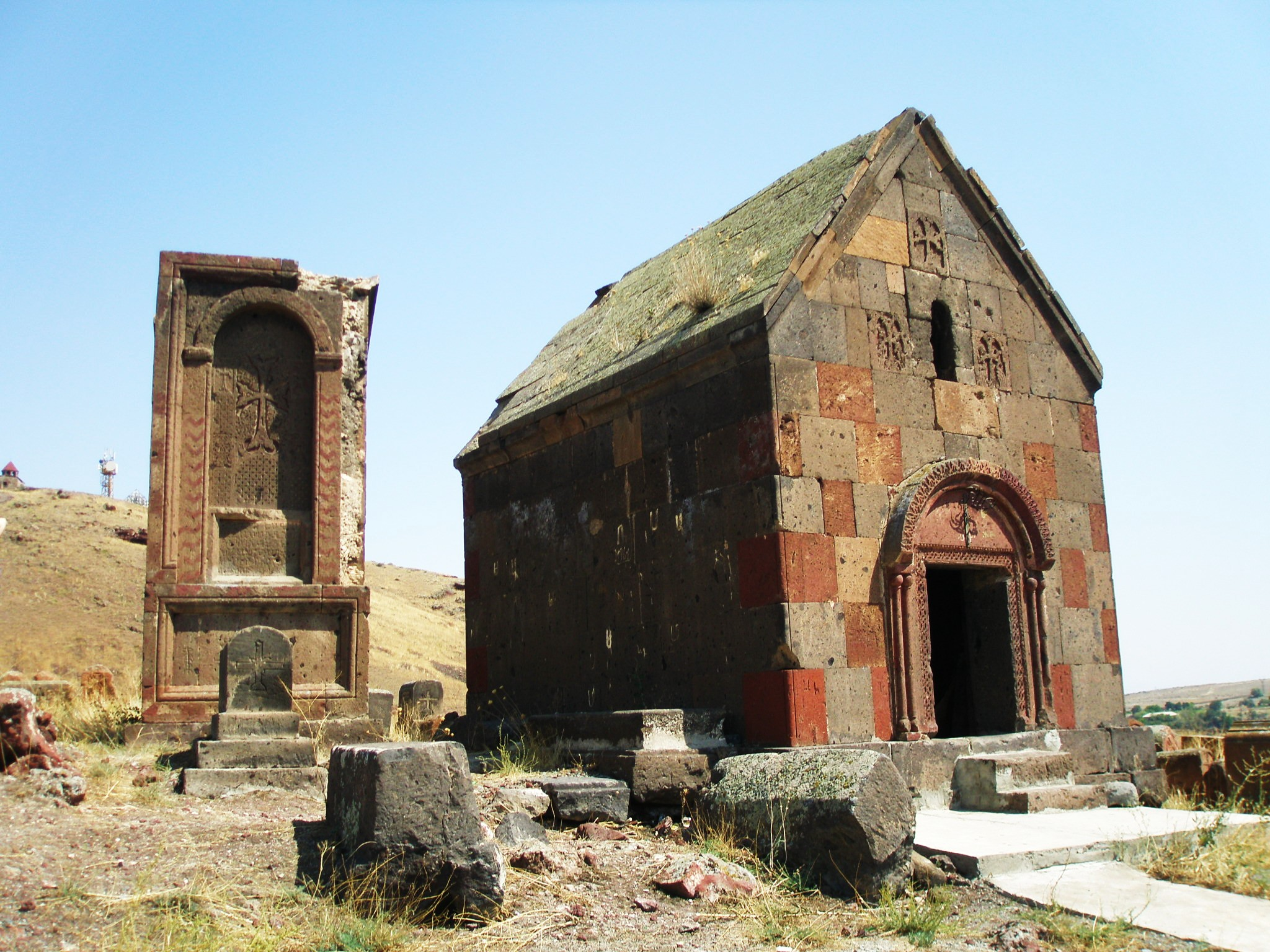
Tukh Manuk Shrine at Oshakan located in a cemetery atop the hill

Tukh Manuk (or Tux Manuk, (Armenian Թուխ Մանուկ), "Dark-skinned Youth") refers to rural shrines in Armenia. Their origin is regarded to be pre-Christian or pagan, but are now a part of a folk tradition existing within the Armenian Church. Many are situated in church ruins or in crudely built enclosures, others are well constructed stone chapels. Some of them are thought to date back to the 5th century, or even the BCE era.

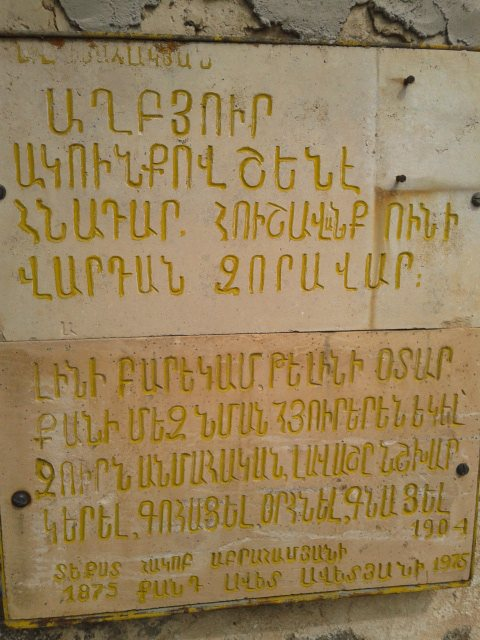
Tukh Manuk, Alapars, Lyrics by Avetik Isahakyan

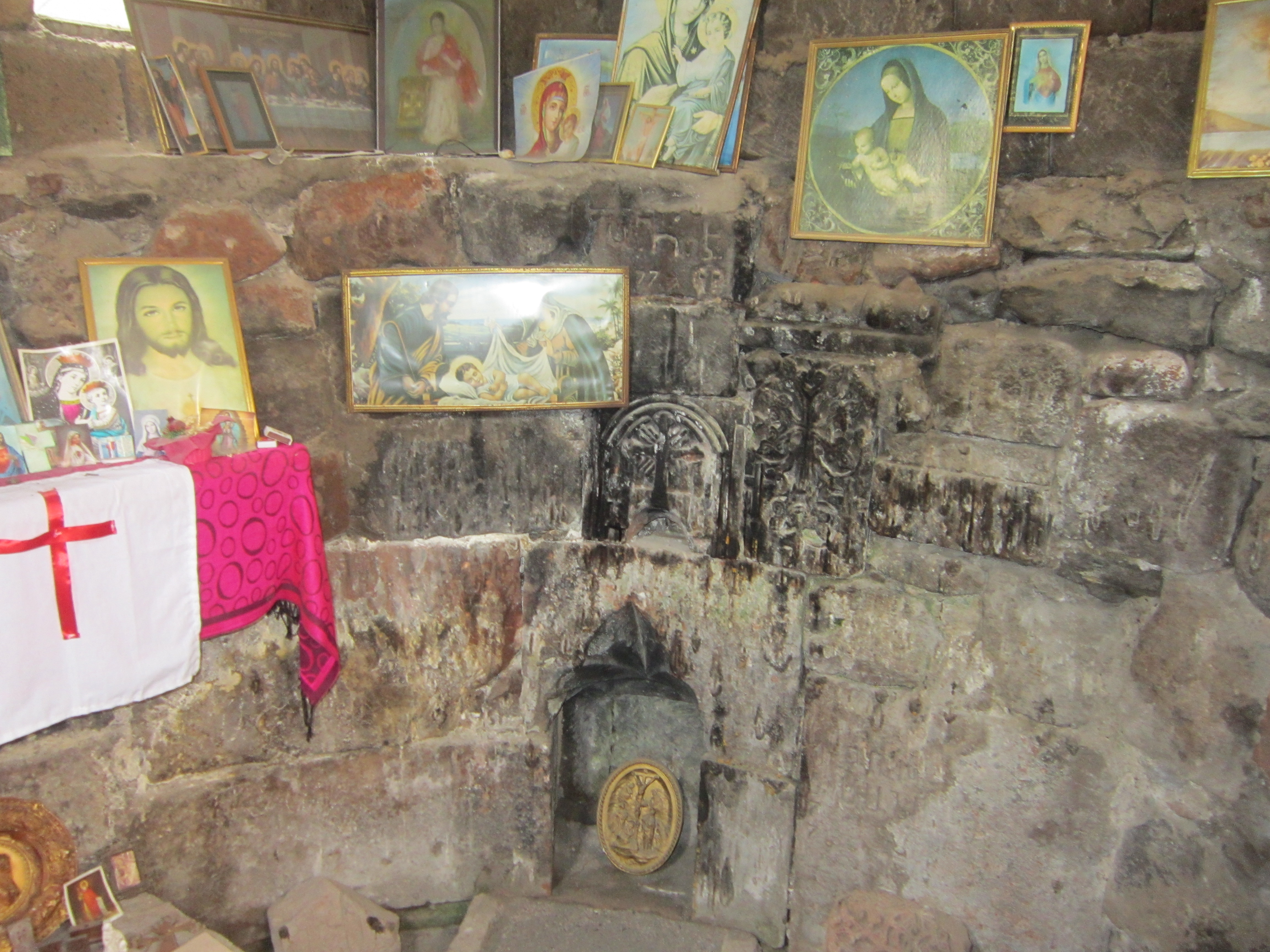
Tukh Manuk chapel of Arinj

Quite popular throughout Armenia, such shrines are often on hilltops, at the sources of springs, or just outside villages. Visiting Tukh Manuk shrines is traditionally popular with women. They are also visited by the Yazidis. Pilgrims gather to make offerings or sacrifices for the curing of illnesses and burn candles.

Tukh Manuk is the main character in numerous medieval and modern folk poems, and is mentioned in the Armenian national epic Daredevils of Sassoun. Its stories are partially based on oral traditions of the 8th to the 10th century and the actions of local Christian Kings fighting against the Arab rivals.

== See also ==
- Armenian mythology
- Astghik
- Vahagn
- Hayk
- Ara the Handsome
- Aram
- Semiramis
- Sargis the General
