= Asdvadzadur of Armenia =

Asdvadzadur of Armenia was the Catholicos of the Armenian Apostolic Church from 8 May 1715 to 1725. He was anointed in Etchmiadzin. As Catholicos, he secured an alliance with Peter the Great of Russia for aid against the expansionist Muslim powers of the Ottoman Empire and Persia prior to the Russo-Persian War.

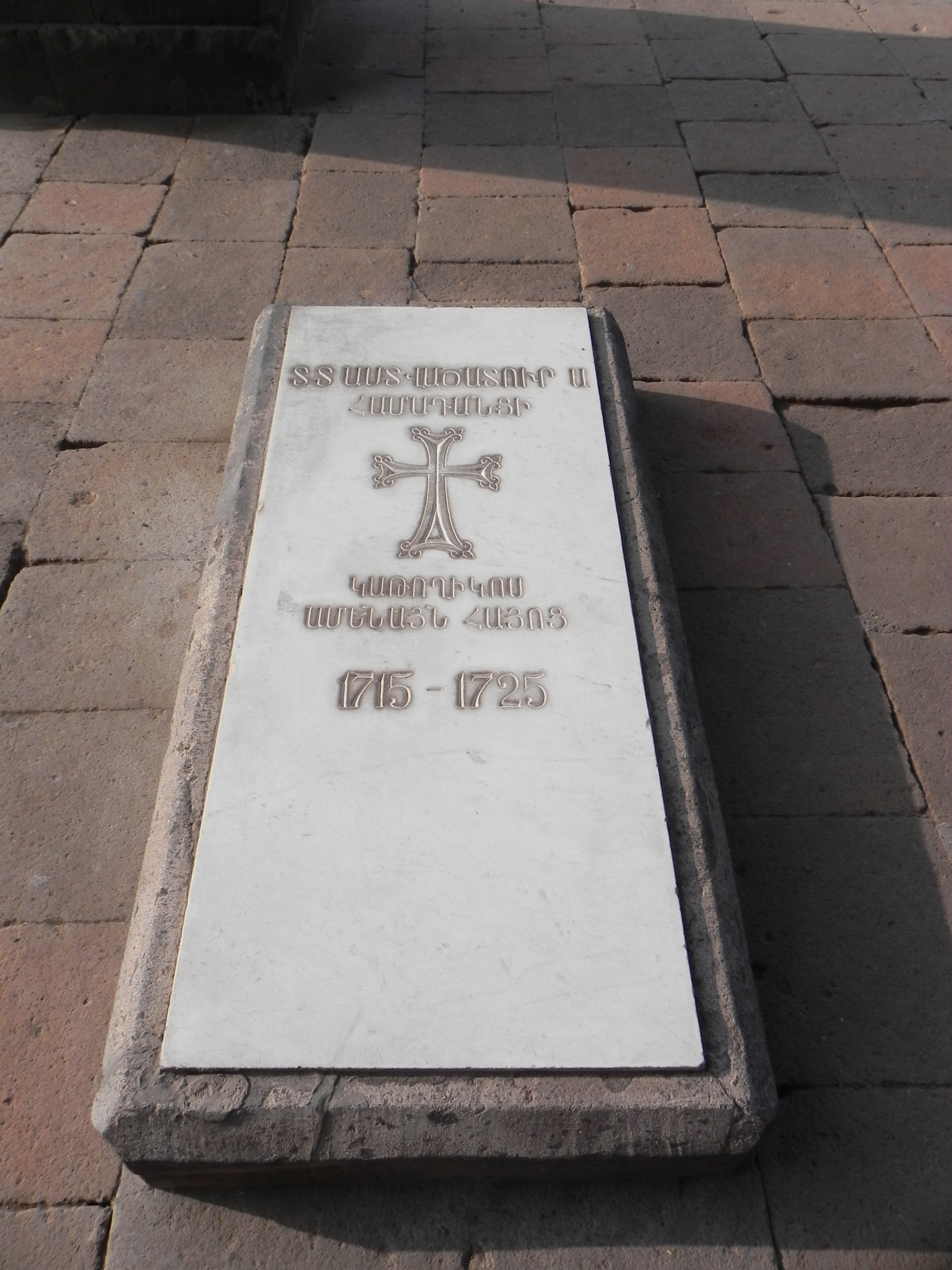
Tombstone of Astvadzadur I, Catholicos of All Armenians, at St. Hripsime church.

He is buried at St. Hripsime Church, Echmiadzin.

Preceded by Alexander I of Armenia	Catholicos of the Holy See of St. Echmiadzin and All Armenians; 1715–1725	Succeeded by Karapet II
