= Abraham II of Armenia =

Catholicos of the Armenian Apostolic Church

- Born: Abraham II of Armenia; 1677; Khoshab in Van Province of the Ottoman Empire
- Other names: Abraham Baghishetzi, Mshetsi and Keghetzi.
- Years active: 1730 and 1734

Catholicos Abraham II Khoshabetzi (in Armenian Աբրահամ Բ Խոշաբեցի) was the Catholicos of the Armenian Apostolic Church between 1730 and 1734.

== Biography ==
Born in Khoshab in Van Province of the Ottoman Empire, he was also known as Abraham Baghishetzi, Mshetsi and Keghetzi, he was born in 1677 and was elected Catholicos of All Armenians after the death of Garabed II of Armenia (in Armenian Կարապետ Բ Ուլնեցի). Previously, starting 1708, he had served as bishop in Muş at the Disciples Convent. Prior to his election, from 1717 to 1730, he was the supervisor of Taron's St. Karapet Convent and had made a pilgrimage to Jerusalem in 1727.

During his reign for 4 years and 9 months as Catholicos of All Armenians, he engaged in reconstruction projects in Etchmiadzin. He is known to have also written a number of encyclicals and spiritual songs. He fell ill with a strong fever on 2 November 1734 and survived only a few days to die on the night of 10–11 November 1734. He was buried in St. Gayané Church in Etchmiadzin.

He was followed by Abraham III of Armenia (in Armenian Աբրահամ Գ Կրետացի):

== Sources ==
- Քրիստոնյա Հայաստան հանրագիտարան (Christian Armenia Encyclopedia), Yerevan, 2002

Religious titles
Preceded by Karapet II of Armenia	Catholicos of the Holy See of St. Echmiadzin and All Armenians; 1730–1734	Succeeded by Abraham III of Armenia
