= Abraham III of Armenia =

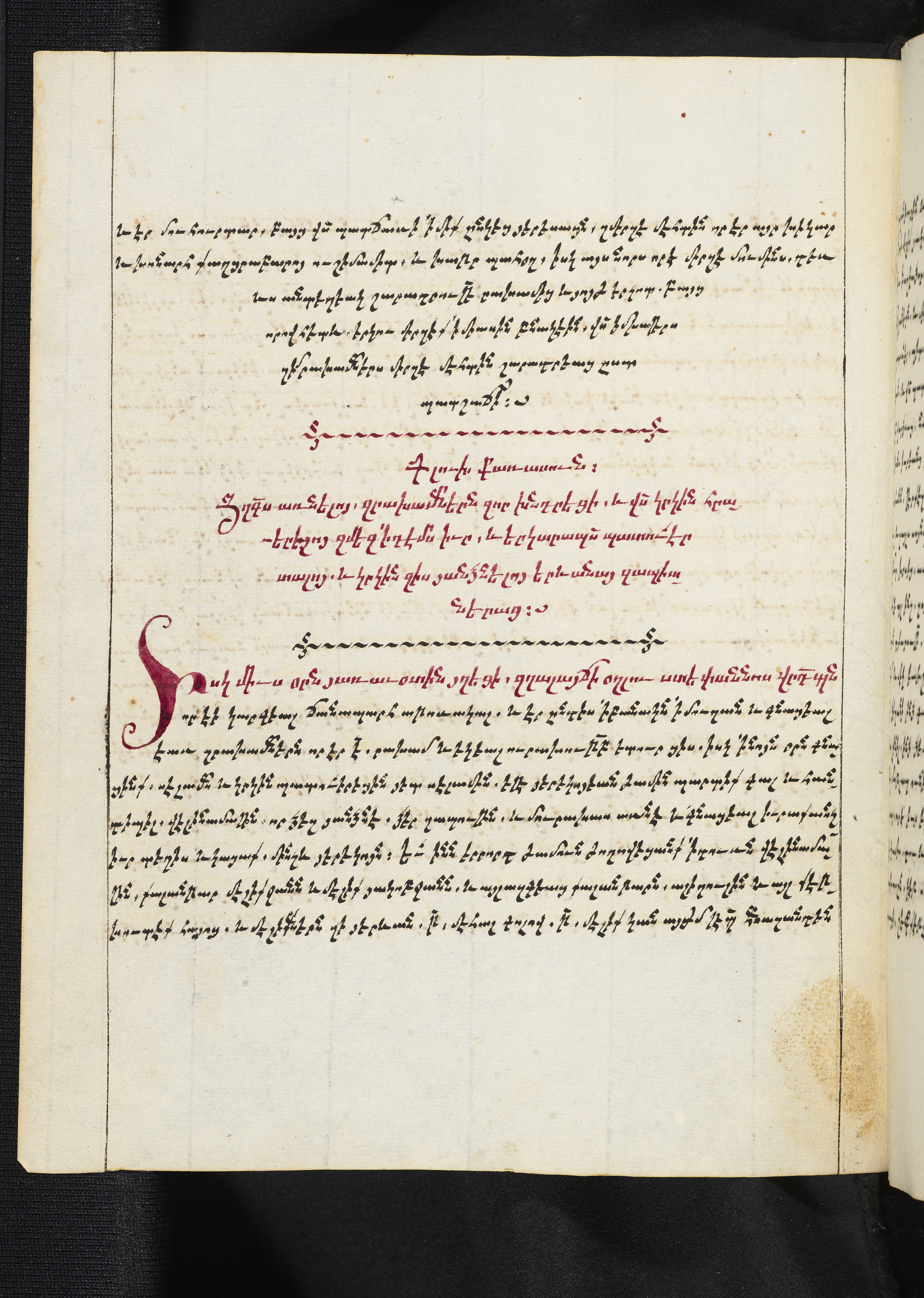
A page from a manuscript of Abraham's chronicle, dated 1734–1736. Stored at the Bodleian Library

Abraham III (also Abraham of Crete or Abraham Kretatsi; died 1737) was the Catholicos of the Armenian Apostolic Church between 1734 and 1737. Born in Heraklion, Crete, to a Greek mother, he was bishop of Rodosto, Thrace and then Armenian prelate of Thrace in 1708–1734. At this time he went on a pilgrimage to eastern Armenia, at that time under Persian rule, which now make up the area of modern-day Armenia and Nakhichevan. Abraham is said to have become Catholicos by chance, because while he was on his pilgrimage to Etchmiadzin Catholicos Abraham II died. Abraham of Crete had impressed many with his religious devotion during his stay there, and so they decided unanimously to elect him the new Catholicos. Abraham III was old at this point and unfamiliar in the workings of Etchmiadzin, so he protested, but despite that in November 1734 he was named the 110th Catholicos of the Armenian Church.

Abraham III came to the throne at a volatile time in the region. Nader Shah of Persia was reconquering territories which had been lost by his predecessors to the Ottomans, including Armenia. Abraham wrote a chronicle of Nader's campaign against the Turks and of his coronation as Shah when in the area. It is one of the few non-Persian sources about these years in Transcaucasia. Abraham wrote that many villages had been left destitute by the Ottoman invasion and that the area was sufferingly greatly. Abraham was invited as a guest of honor at Nader's coronation, and Armenian princes were granted autonomy. Abraham recorded detailed conversations he had with the Shah, most likely partly to serve as a record of the many privileges granted to Armenians by the shah and to serve as an example to the Ottomans who also ruled over a large Armenian population. Nader Shah visited the Armenian mother church of Etchmiadzin and reconfirmed its tax-exempt status.

Abraham III died in April 1737 at Etchmiadzin and was buried there after his short but successful reign.

== Notes ==
Preceded by Abraham II of Armenia	Catholicos of the Holy See of St. Echmiadzin and All Armenians; 1734–1737	Succeeded by Lazar_I_of_Armenia
