= Tegher =

Tegher may refer to:

- Tegher monastery, Armenia
- Tegher, Armenia, village in Armenia
