= Surp Hovhannes Church, Byurakan =

Historic church in Aragatsotn Province, Armenia

Surb Hovhannes Church
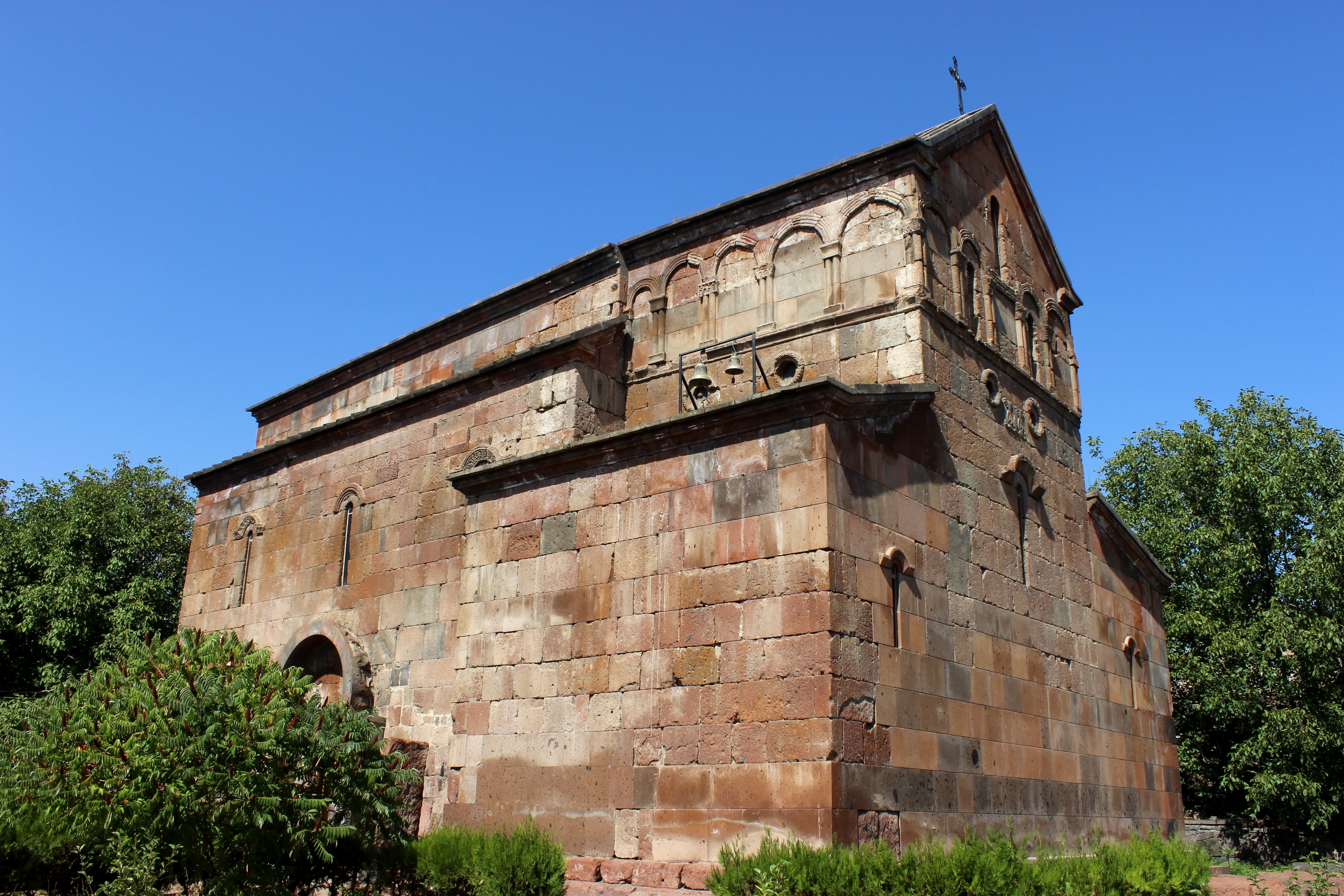
- Basilica Church of S. Hovhannes at Byurakan

- Location within Armenia Location within Aragatsotn

Religion
- Affiliation: Armenian Apostolic Church

Location
- Location: Byurakan, Aragatsotn Province, Armenia
- Coordinates: 40.3400°N 44.2703°E

Architecture
- Type: Basilica without dome
- Style: Armenian
- Completed: 10th century

Surp Hovhannes Church (Armenian: Սուրբ Հովհաննես եկեղեցի; translates to the "Church of Saint John") is an important 10th-century basilica located in the village of Byurakan in the Aragatsotn Province of Armenia. Not very far away from S. Hovhannes in the same village, are the ruins of the Artavazik Church of the 7th century with a huge 13th-century khachkar monument directly across the ravine from the structure.

== Architecture ==
Surp Hovhannes has two portals that lead into the building. The main entrance is from the side of the church, and has an inscription upon the lintel above the portal. Indications of the structure's age can be seen in the temple style steps leading up to S. Hovhannes and the Maltese Crosses carved into the façade.

Khachkars and other decorative stones may be found around the premises.

== Gallery ==
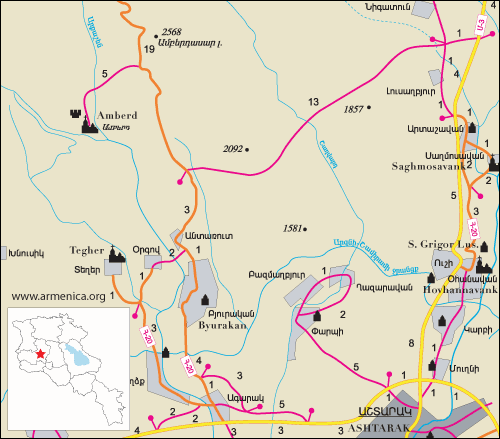
Road map of Byurakan and surrounding region.

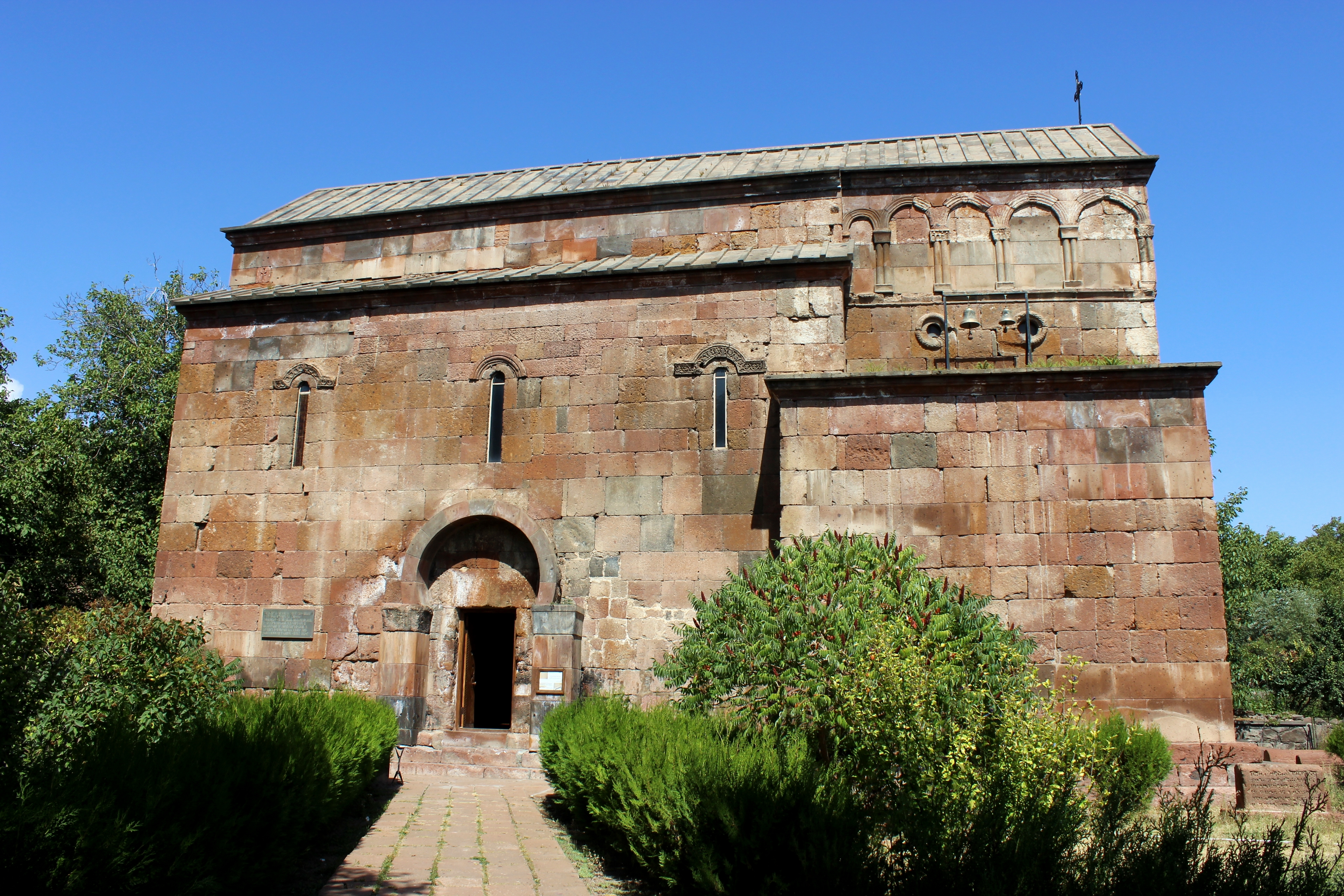
Front view

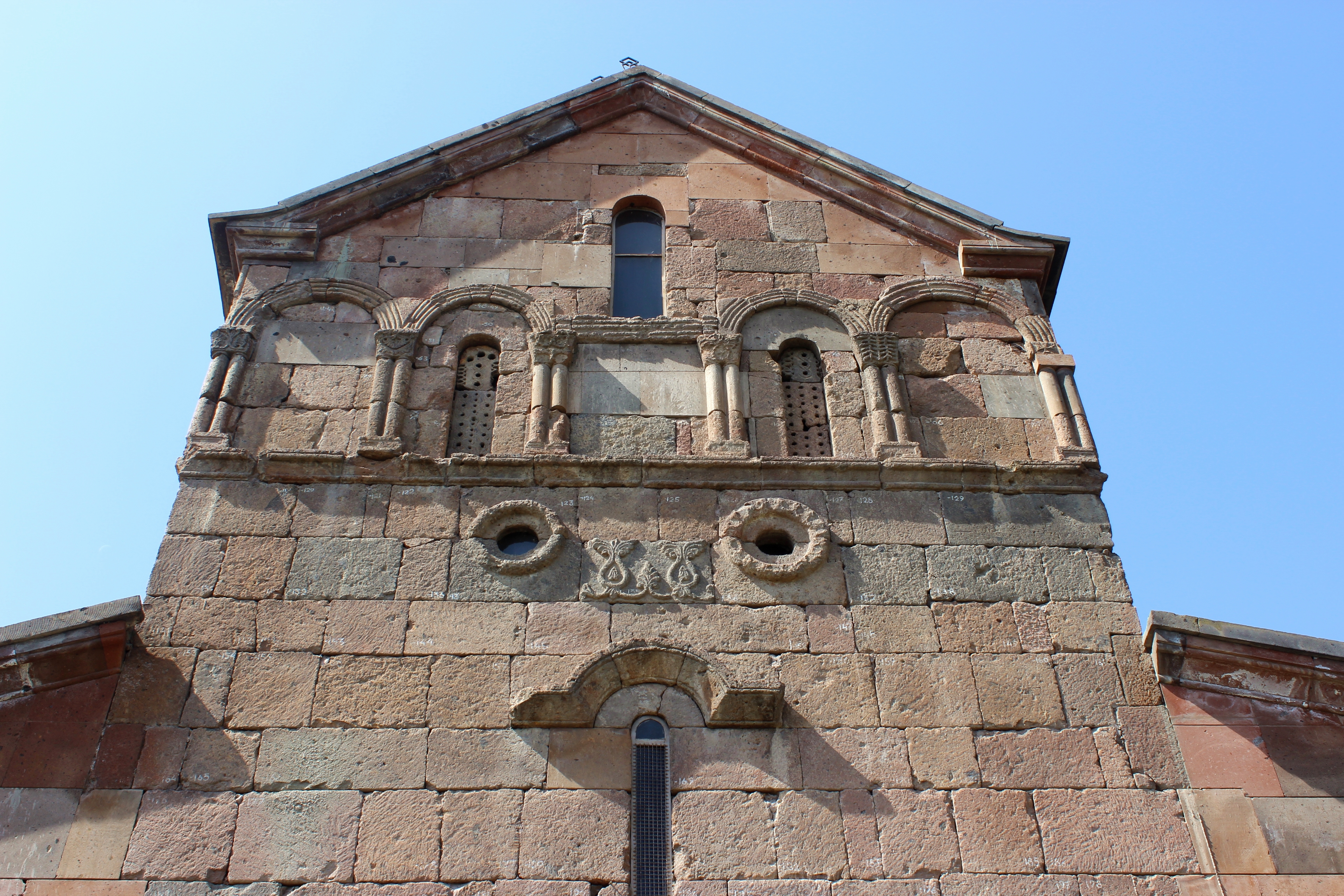

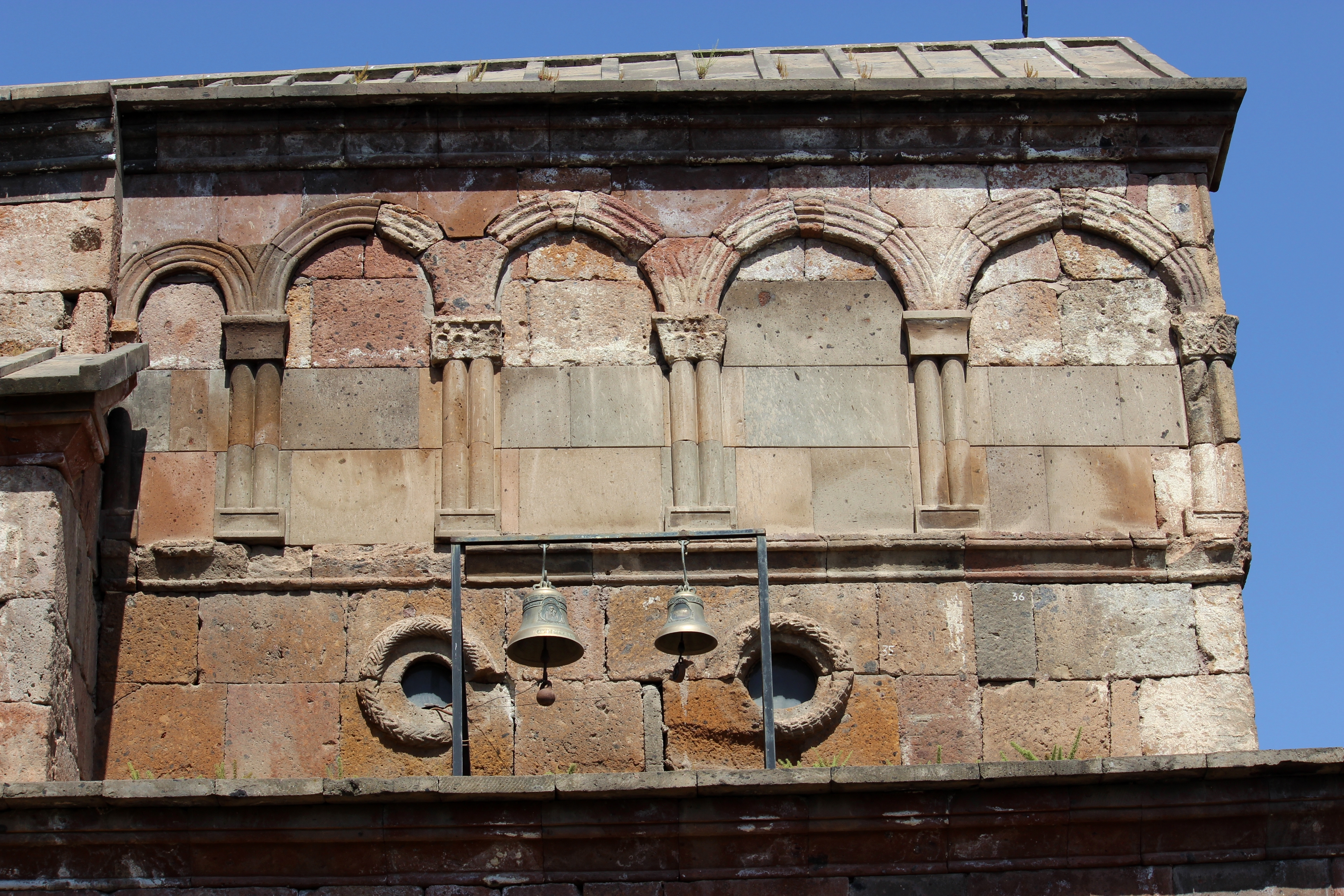
View of the church bells and upper story windows

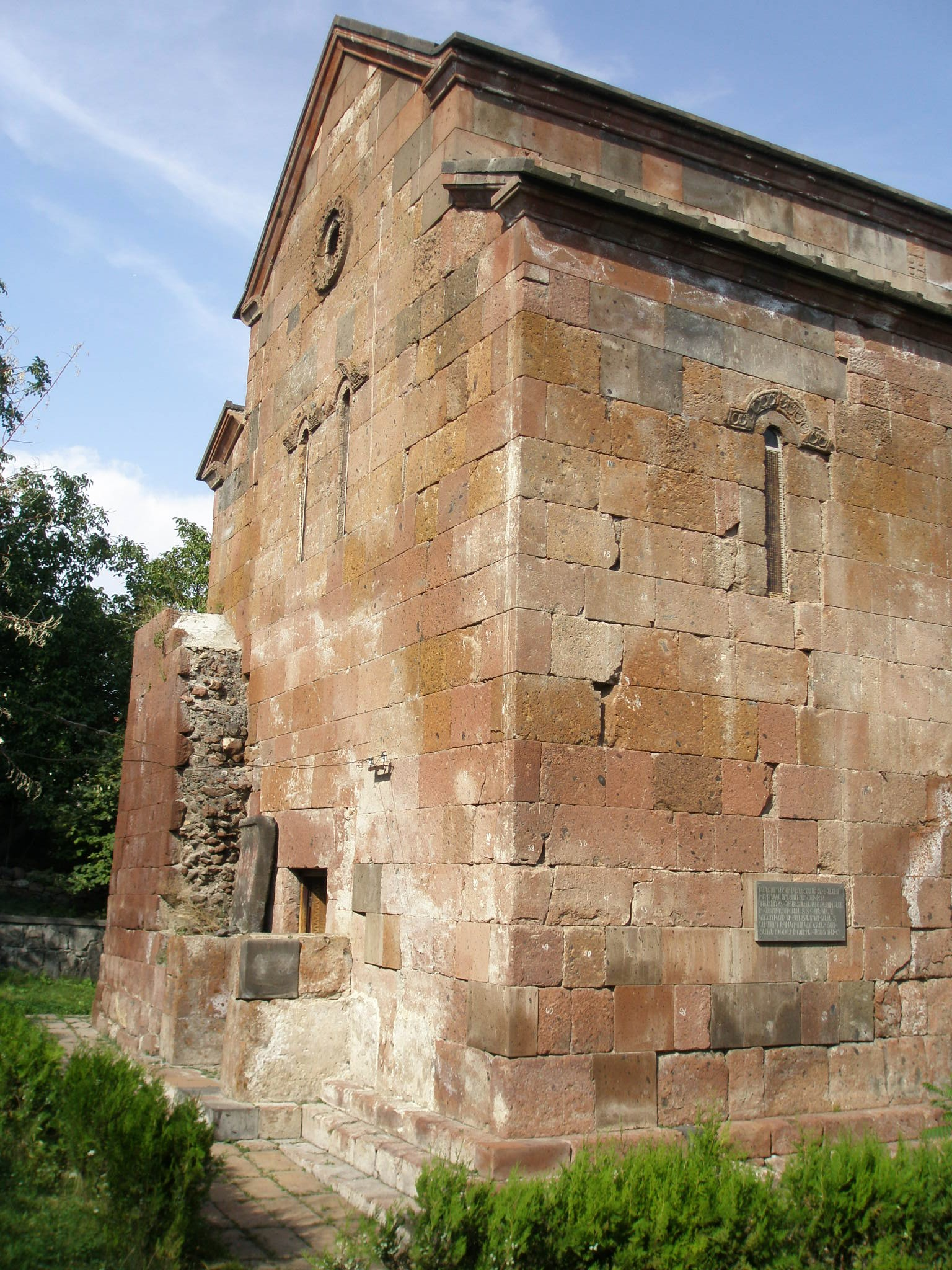
Rear of the basilica with portal.

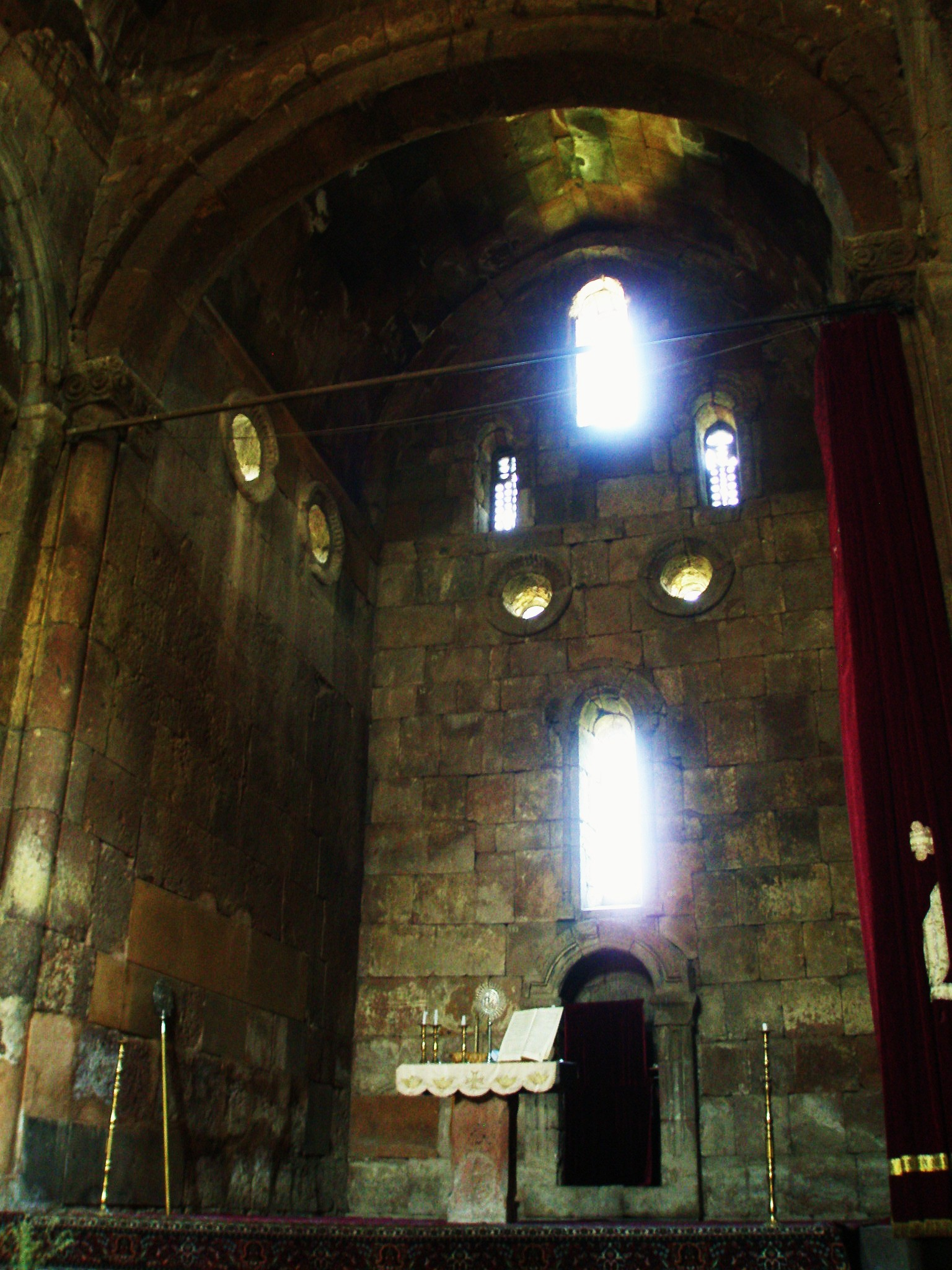
Interior of the basilica.

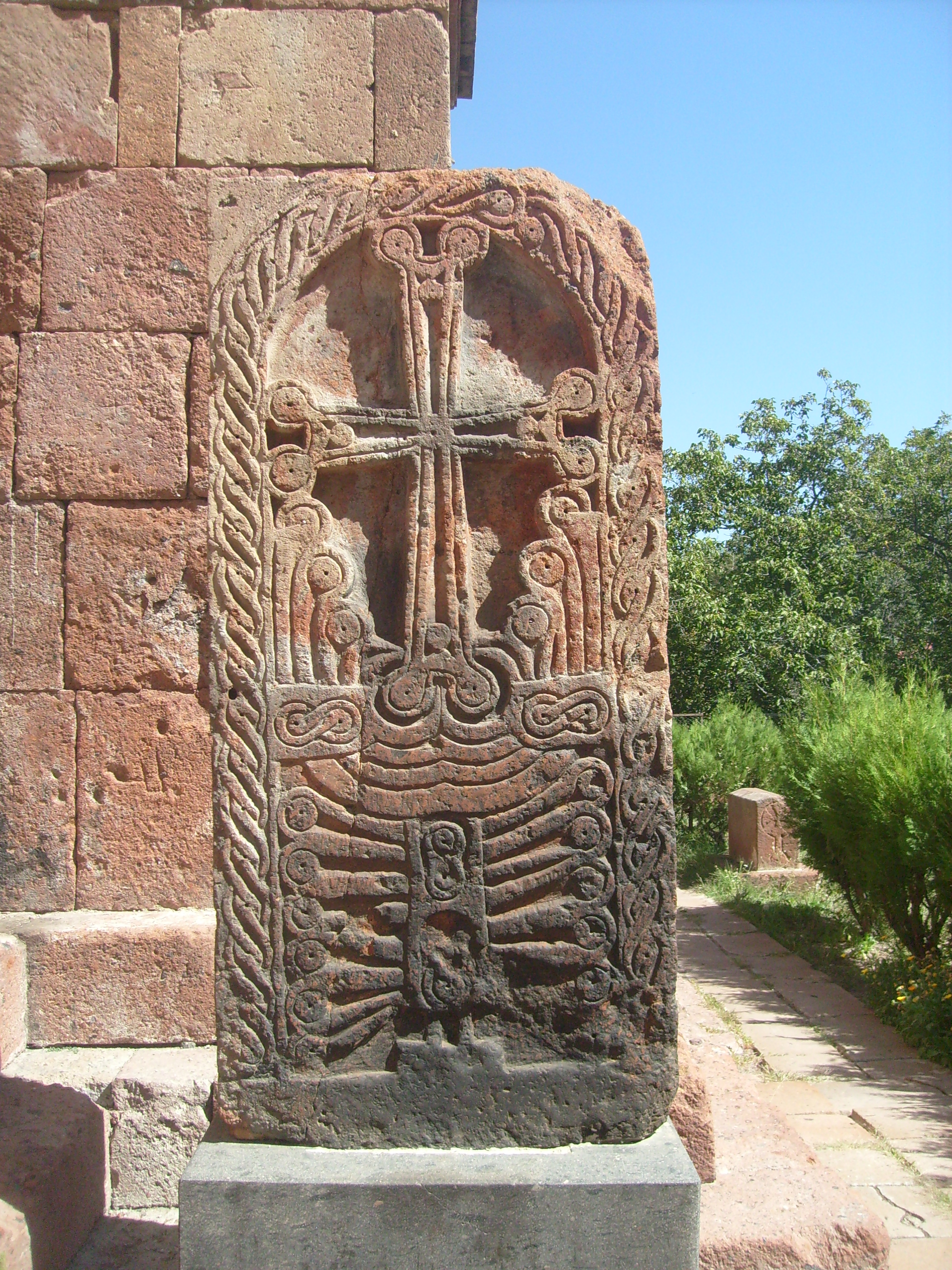
Khachkar with twelve arms (below cross) representing the Twelve Apostles at the Last Supper

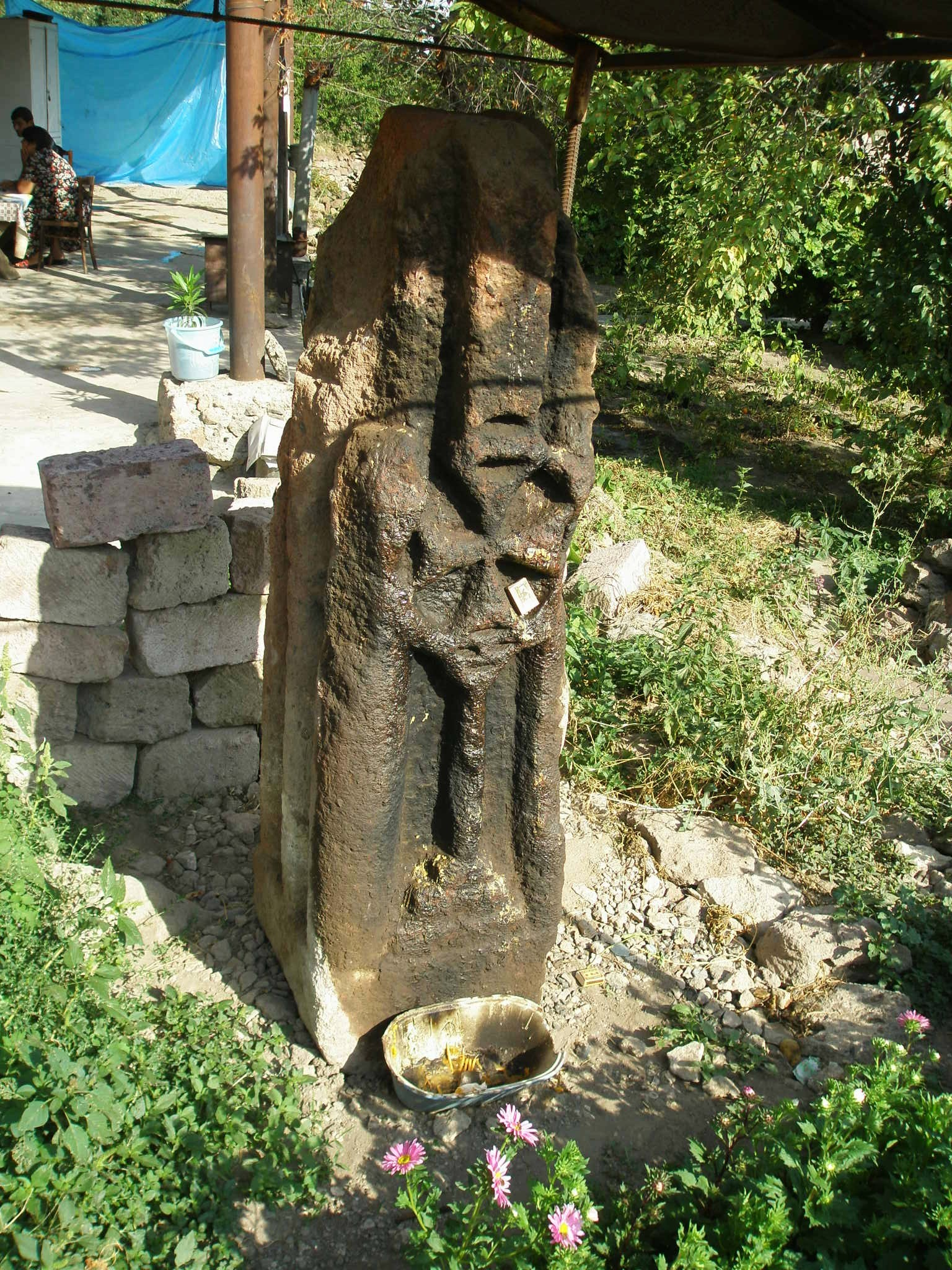
Unusual pillar style khachkar with a Maltese Cross located down the road from the church.
