= Tegher Monastery =

13th-century Armenian monastery and church

Tegher Monastery Տեղերի Վանք
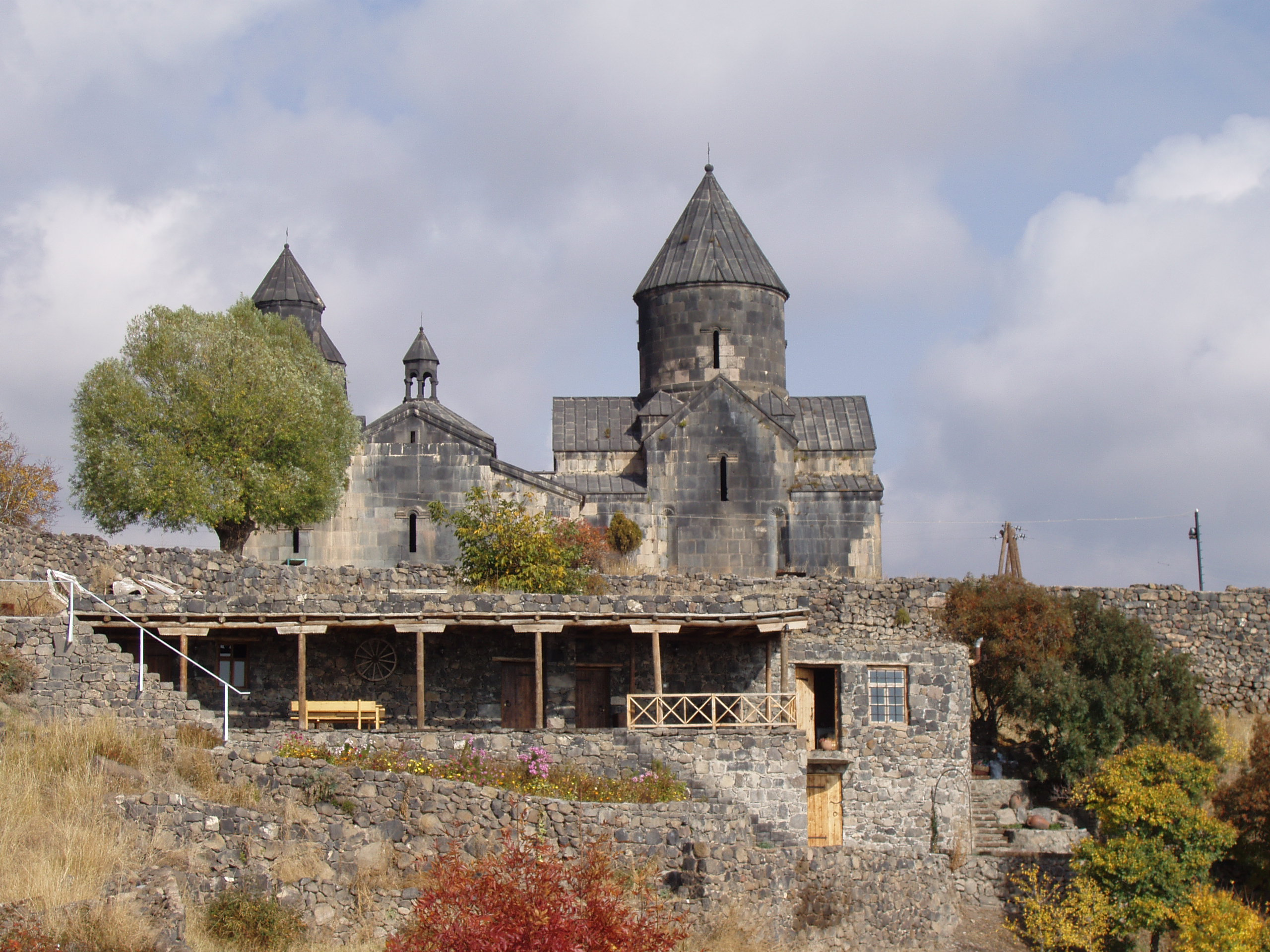
- The Monastery of Tegher.

- Location within Armenia Location within Aragatsotn

Religion
- Affiliation: Armenian Apostolic Church

Location
- Location: Near the modern village of Tegher and across the gorge from Byurakan, Aragatsotn Province, Armenia
- Coordinates: 40.345092°N 44.240544°E

Architecture
- Architect: Vardapet Aghbayrik
- Style: Armenian
- Completed: 13th century

Tegher Monastery (Armenian: Տեղեր or Տեղերի Վանք; also Tegheri Vank) is an early 13th-century Armenian monastery and church located on the southeastern slopes of Mount Aragats near the modern village of Tegher, and across the gorge from the village of Byurakan in the Aragatsotn Province of Armenia. It was built for Princess Khatun (also known as Mamakhatun), the wife of Prince Vache I Vachutian who had purchased the district of Aragatzotn from the Zakarian brothers. The architect Vardapet Aghbayrik designed Tegher and the monasteries of Saghmosavank and Hovhannavank during the 13th century. The monastery survived intact during a time when Mongol invasions plagued the lands.

Ruins of the 9th century village of Tegher (Old Tegher) sit a short-distance walk from the monastery. Numerous foundations may be seen, along with the remains of a Tukh Manuk funerary chapel of the 5th century. Nearby is also the medieval to 19th century cemetery with some mausoleums and khachkars.

== Architecture ==
=== Church ===
The church of Surb Astvatsatsin was built in 1213, and is constructed from dark gray basalt. It is a cruciform type plan with a chamber in each of the four corners and a semicircular apse at the end of the hall. A central tall round drum rests above with a tent style dome, supported by the corners of the square which is supported by columns below. The roof of the church is gabled. The structure is simply decorated except for the cornice moldings and accentuation of the arches in the main area. From the exterior, the building is rectangular with two wall niches and windows on the north, east, and south.

=== Gavit ===
The gavit adjacent to S. Astvatsatsin was finished in 1221. It is a large central-plan with four large columns. Intersecting arches support the square on which a dome with an oculus sits. Situated towards the front of the gavit at either corner, are two second-story rooms where students of the monastery once lived and were able to escape persecution from potential invading forces. Above these rooms are towers that are similar in construction to the main dome and drum of the church. On one of the columns of the gavit is an inscription that gives credit to the architect Vardapet Aghbayrik for designing S. Astvatsatsin and its gavit. In this same structure are numerous graves, one of which is the noble Princess Khatun and another is her husband Prince Vatcheh Vatchutian. Just outside the gavit, upon the front façade above the portal are a grouping of cross designs carved into the stone. Each is a memorial to a wealthy donor who supported the construction of the monastery, and is thus given "free passage" to heaven.

== Gallery ==
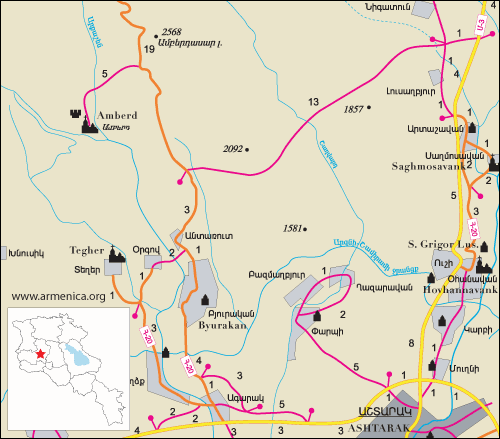
Road map showing the location of Tegher Monastery and the surrounding region.

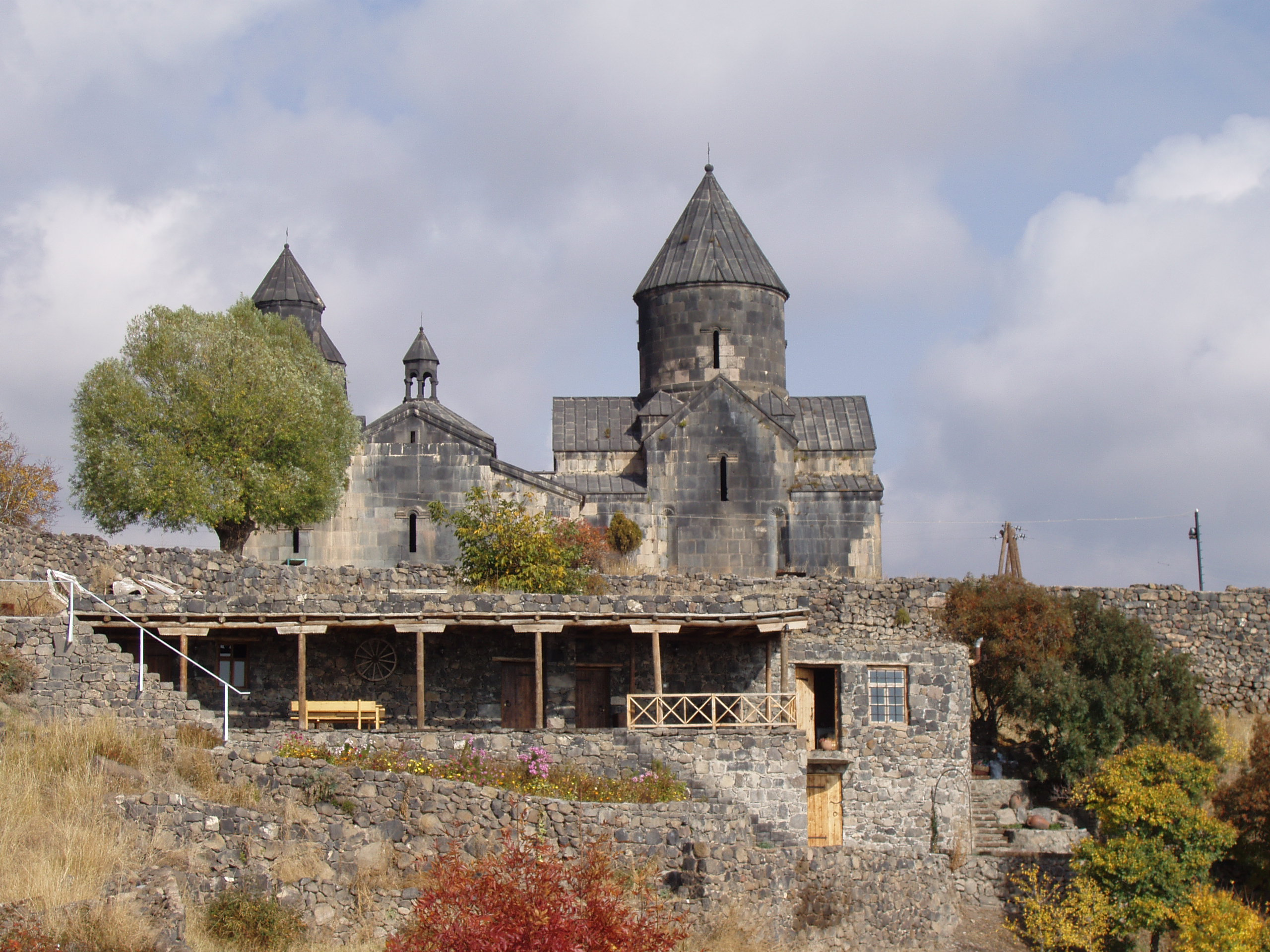
View with the foundation.

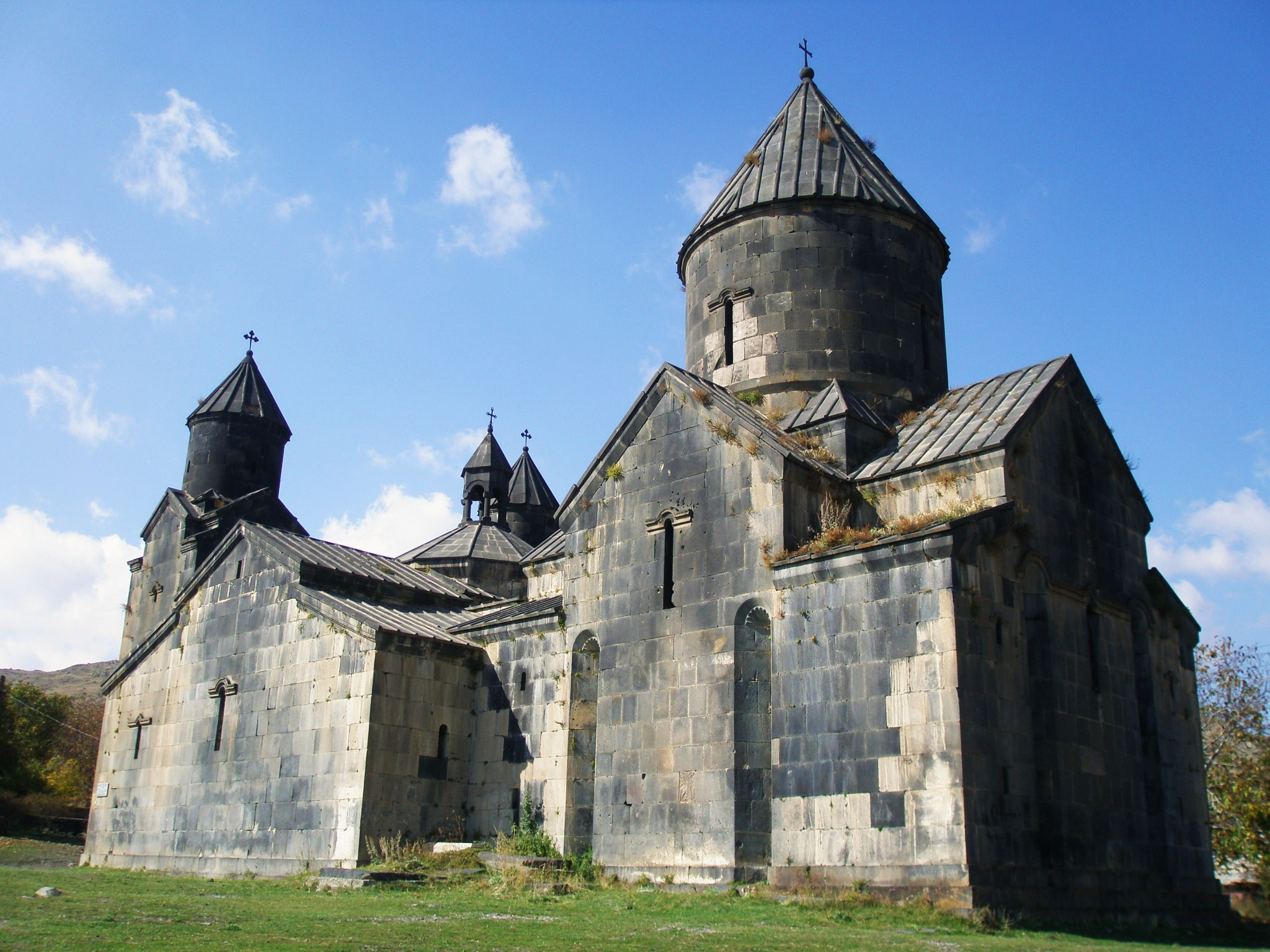
View from the southeast side.

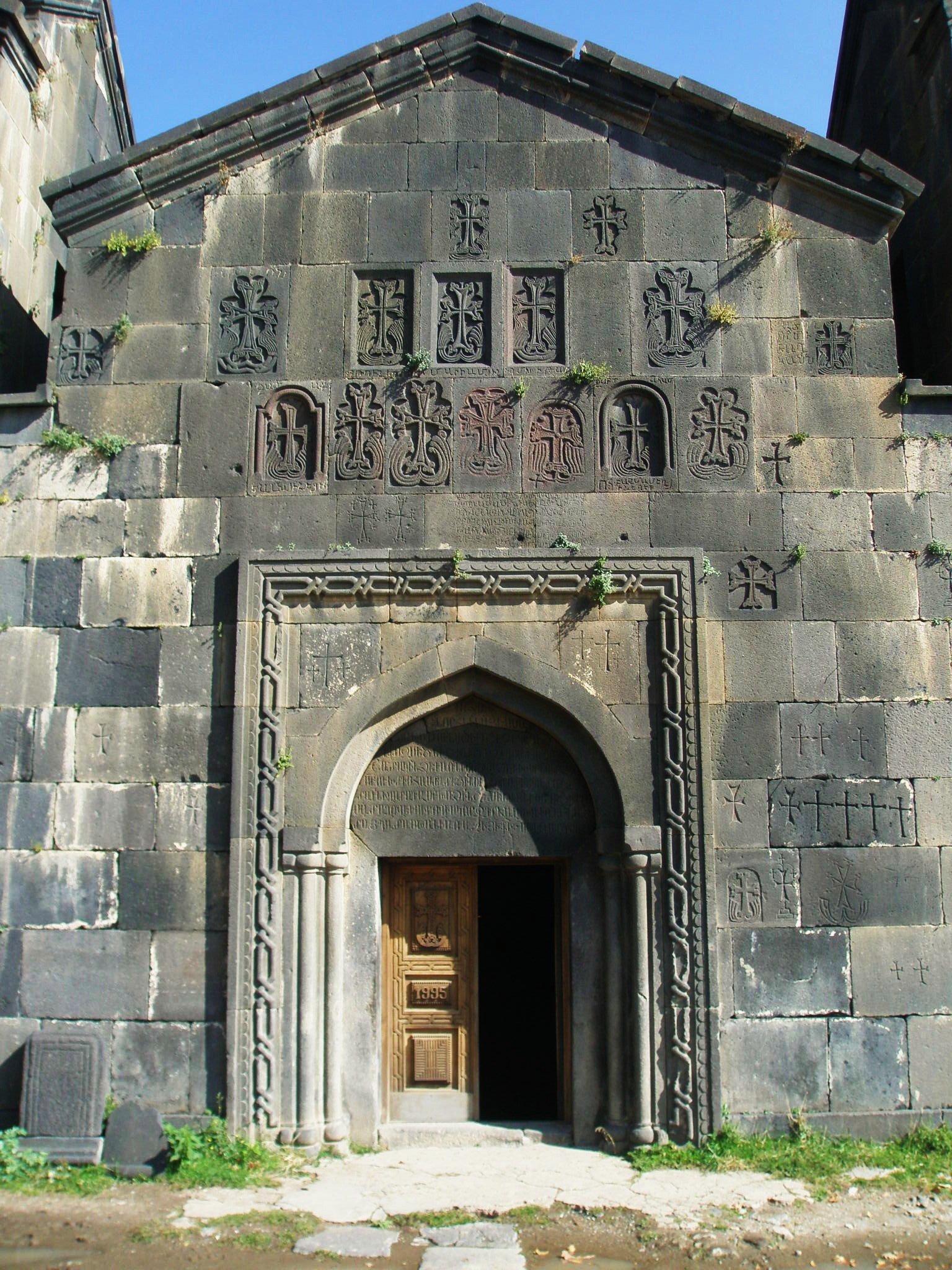
Portal at the front façade of the gavit.

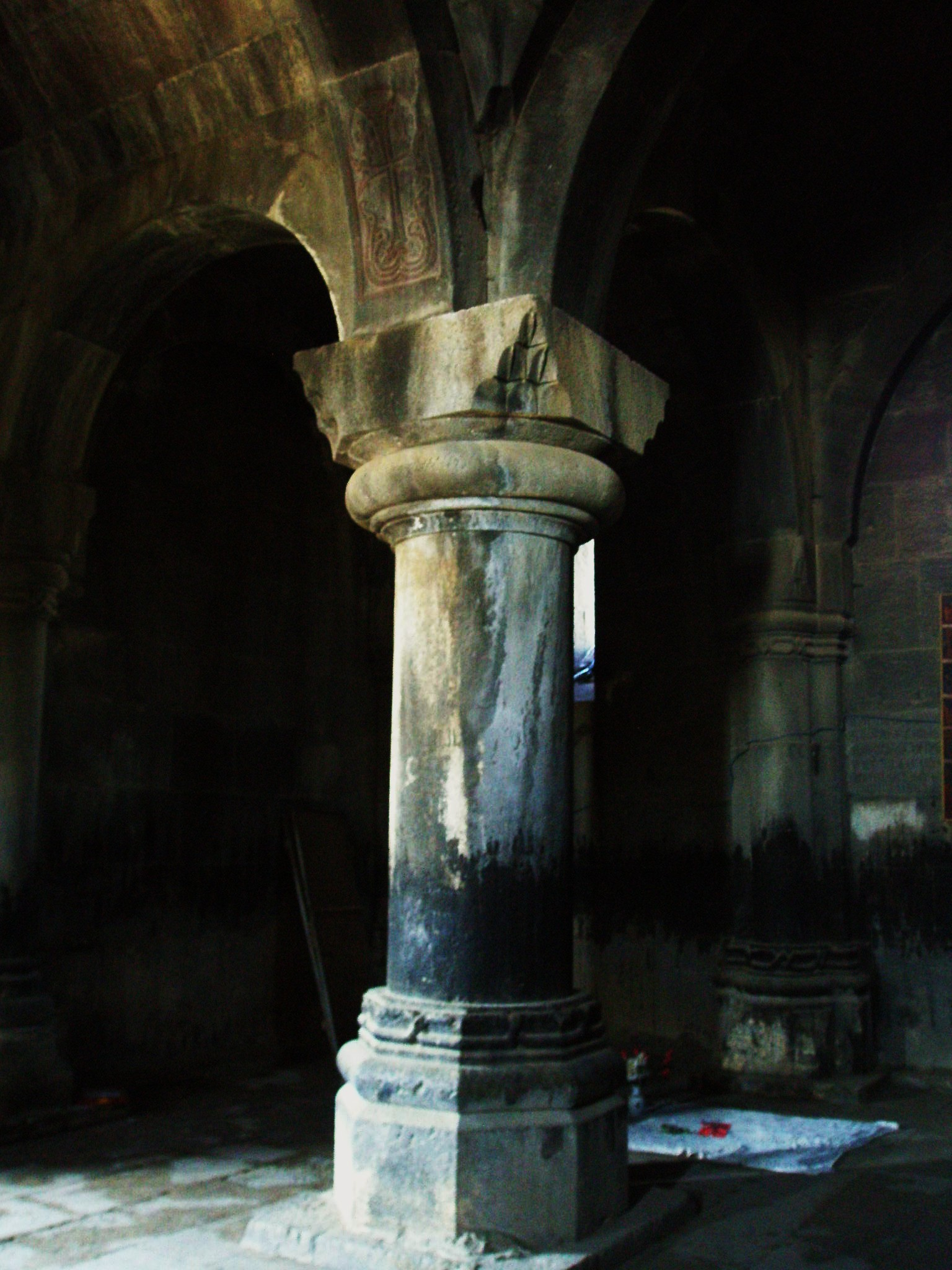
One of the columns of the gavit. The grave of Princess Khatun lays covered with a white cloth behind.

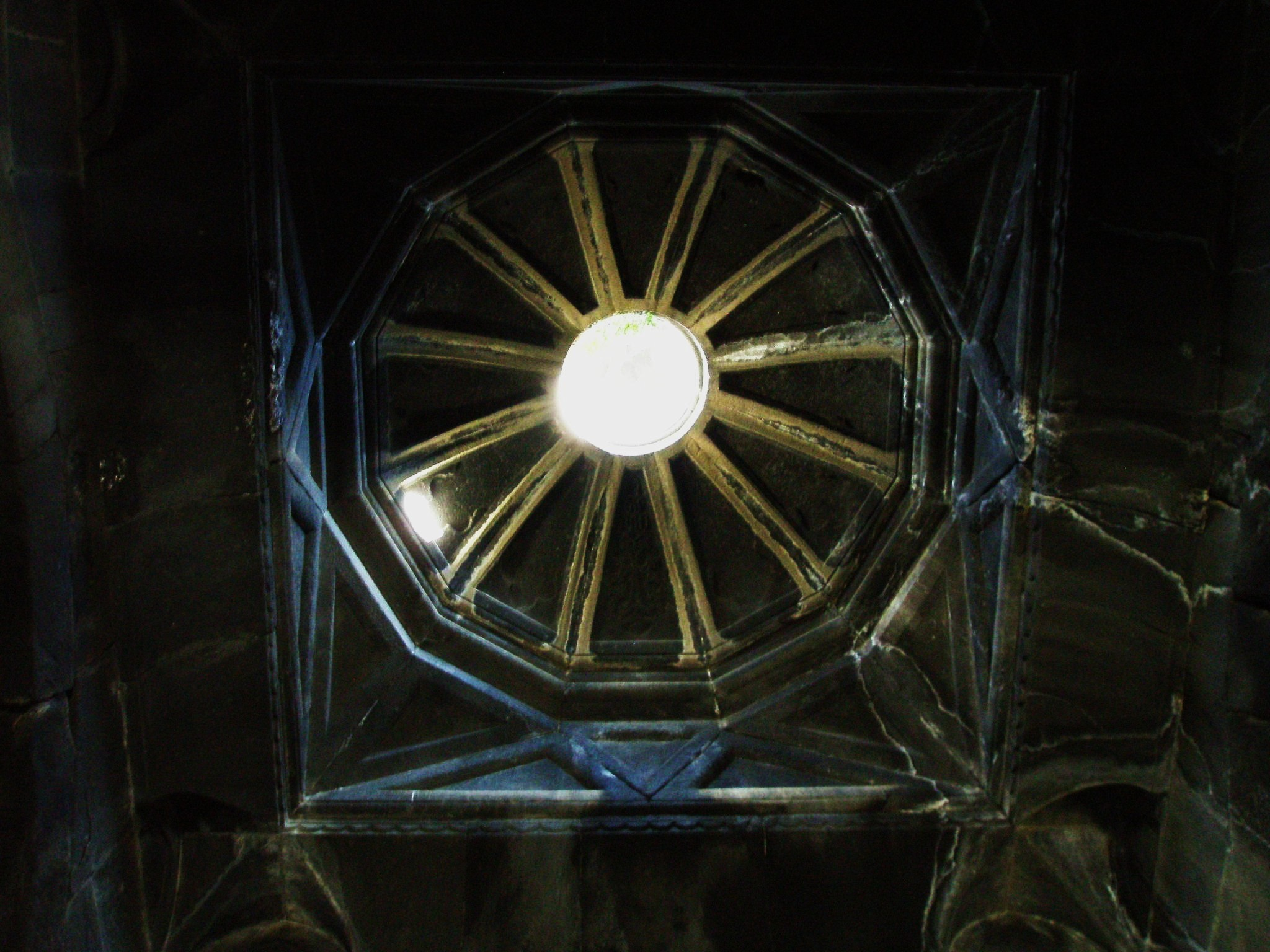
Dome located centrally above the gavit.

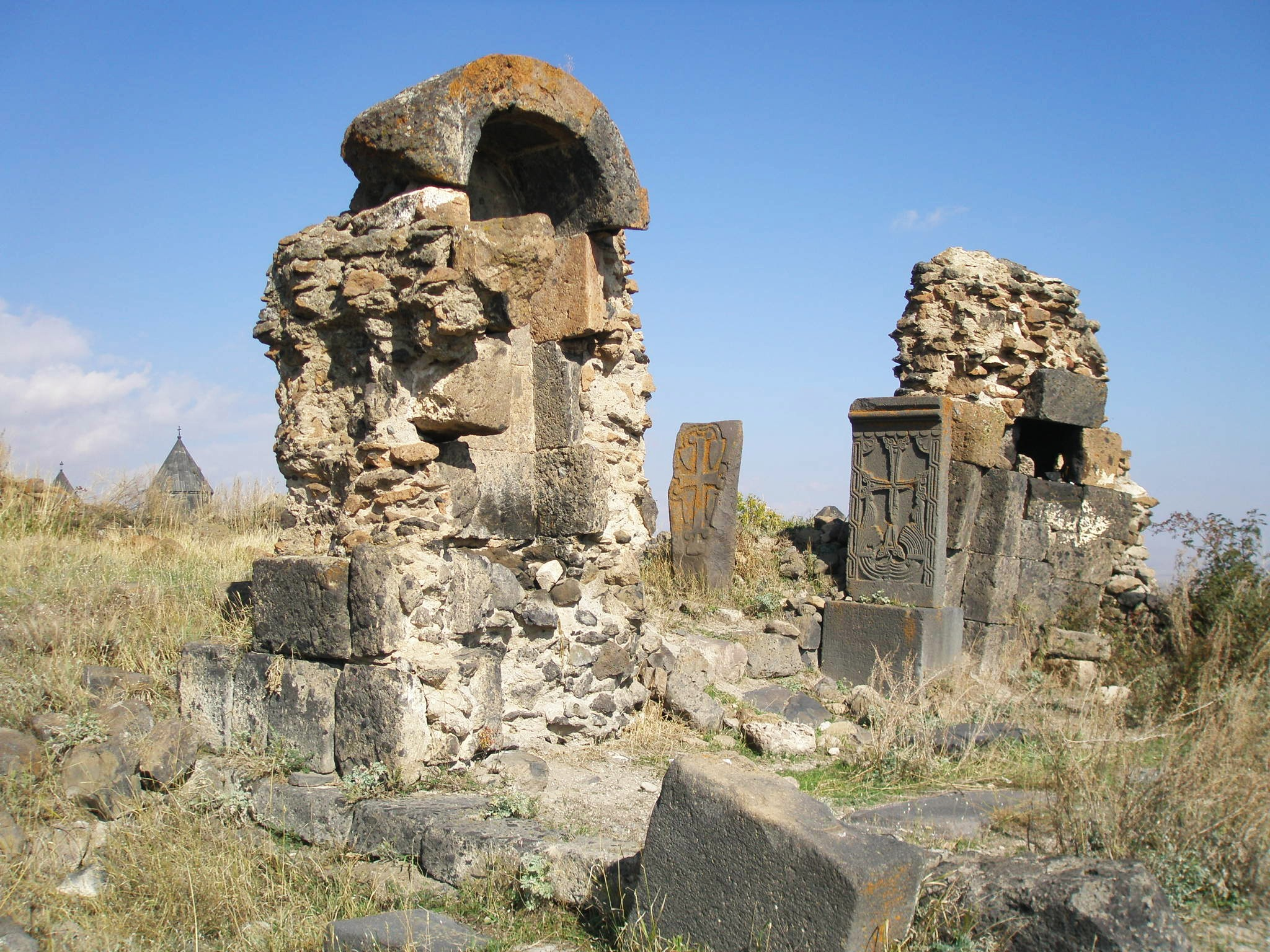
5th century Tukh Manuk Chapel ruins near the monastic complex.

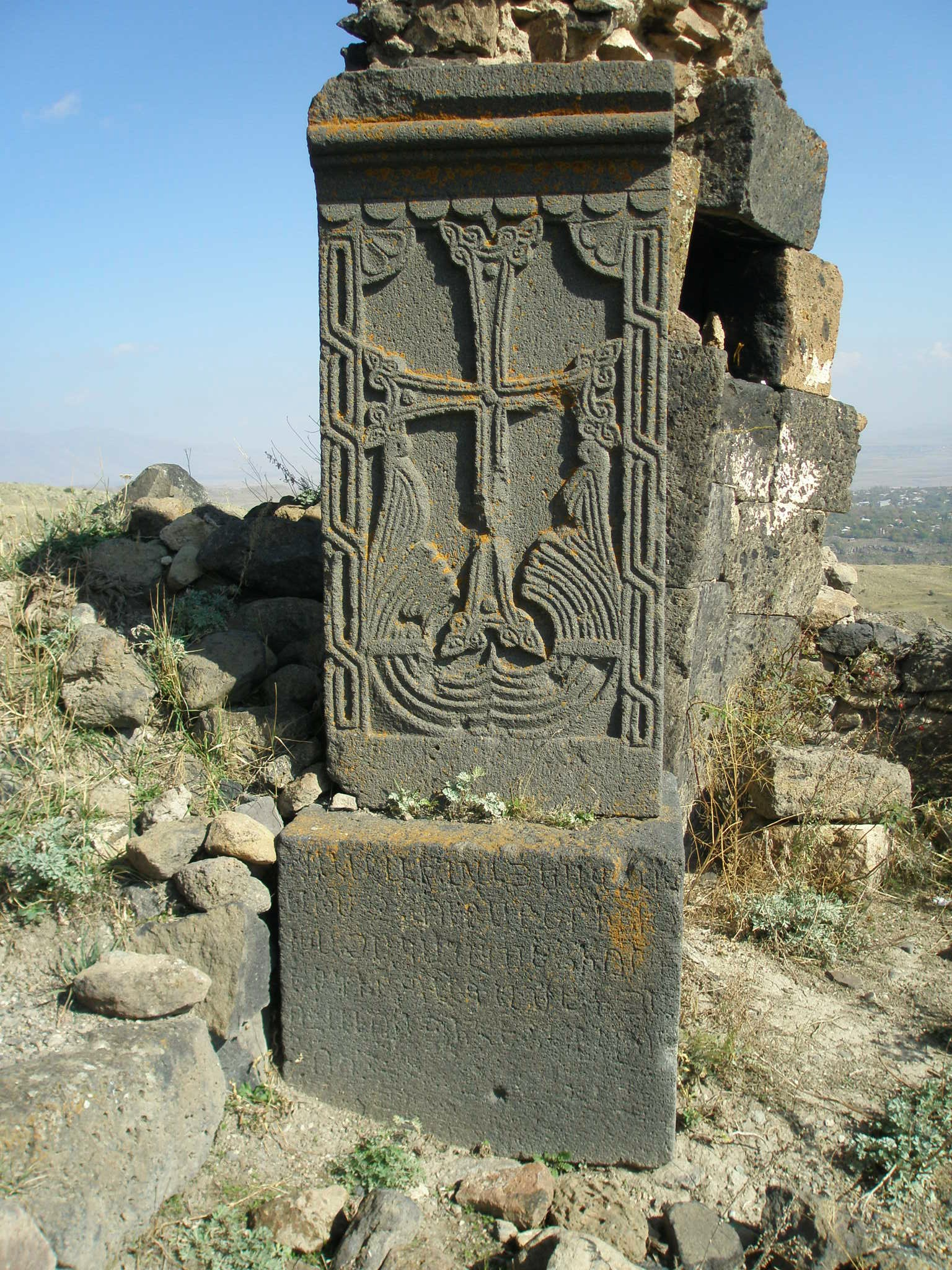
Khachkar at the chapel.
