= Byurakan =

Byurakan Բյուրական
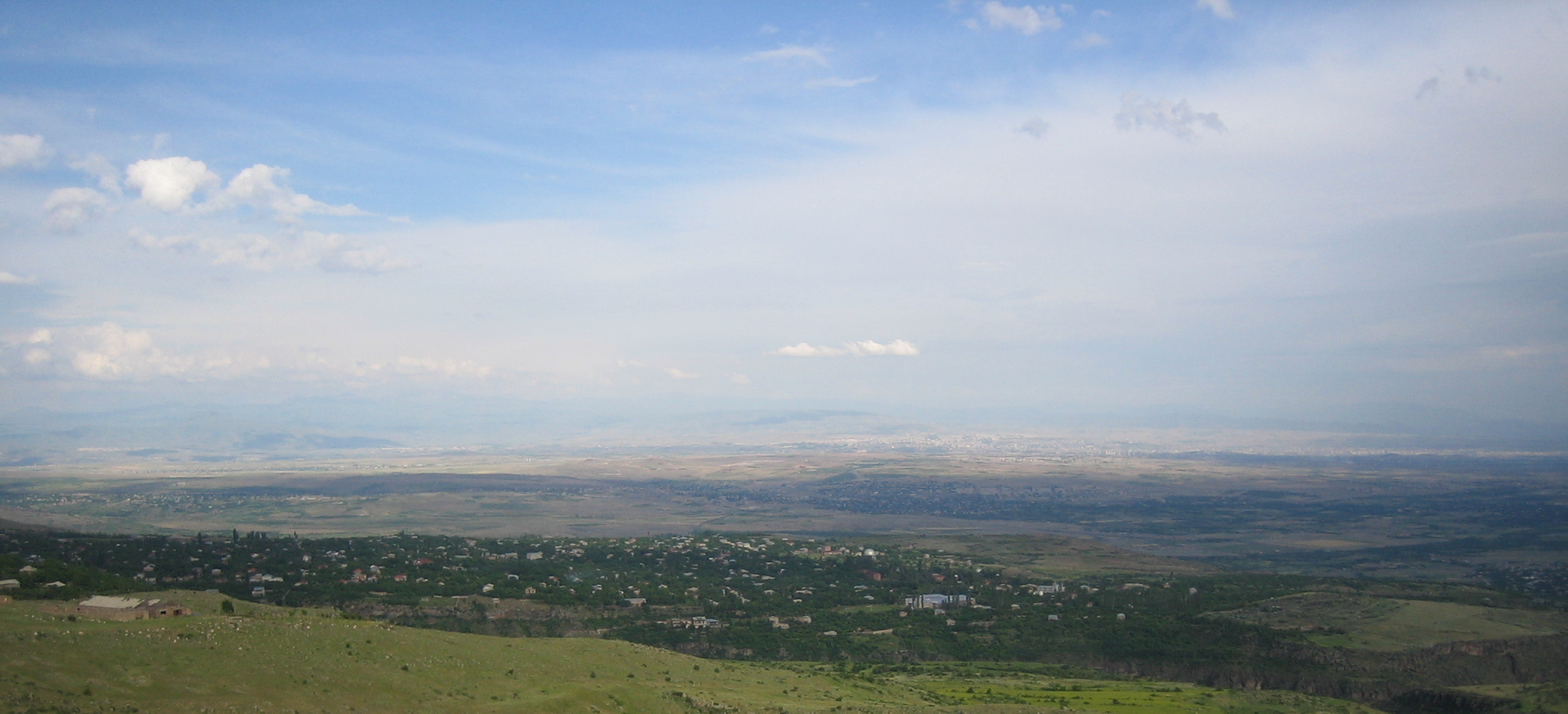
- View of Byurakan as seen from the village of Tegher

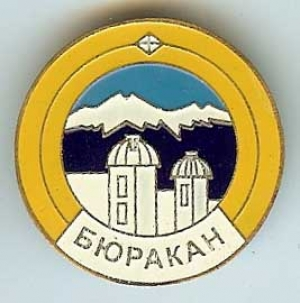
- Coat of arms

- Location within Armenia Location within Aragatsotn
- Coordinates: 40°20′24″N 44°16′13″E
- Country: Armenia
- Province: Aragatsotn
- Municipality: Ashtarak

Government
  - Mayor: Zarzand Babayan

Area
  - Total: 21.27 km^{2} (8.21 sq mi)
- Elevation: 1,460 m (4,790 ft)

Population (2011)
  - Total: 4,345
- Time zone: UTC+4
  - Summer (DST): UTC+5

Byurakan (Armenian: Բյուրական) is a village in the Ashtarak Municipality of the Aragatsotn Province of Armenia, located on the slope of Mount Aragats. The village is home to several historical sites including the 7th-century Artavazik Church, the 10th-century basilica of Saint Hovhannes and a huge 13th-century khachkar monument.

It is also home to the Byurakan Observatory.

== Byurakan Observatory ==
Byurakan observatory is founded in 1946 by Viktor Hambardzumyan, Armenian scientist. There are several telescopes. The diameter of the biggest telescope is 2.6m (the biggest telescope in Caucasus). There is also a 1m Schmidt telescope.

== Gallery ==
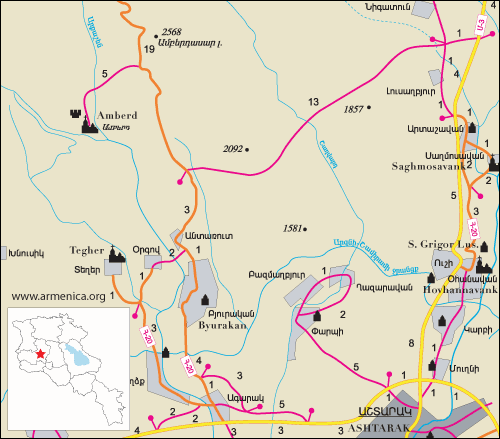
Road map of Byurakan and surrounding region.

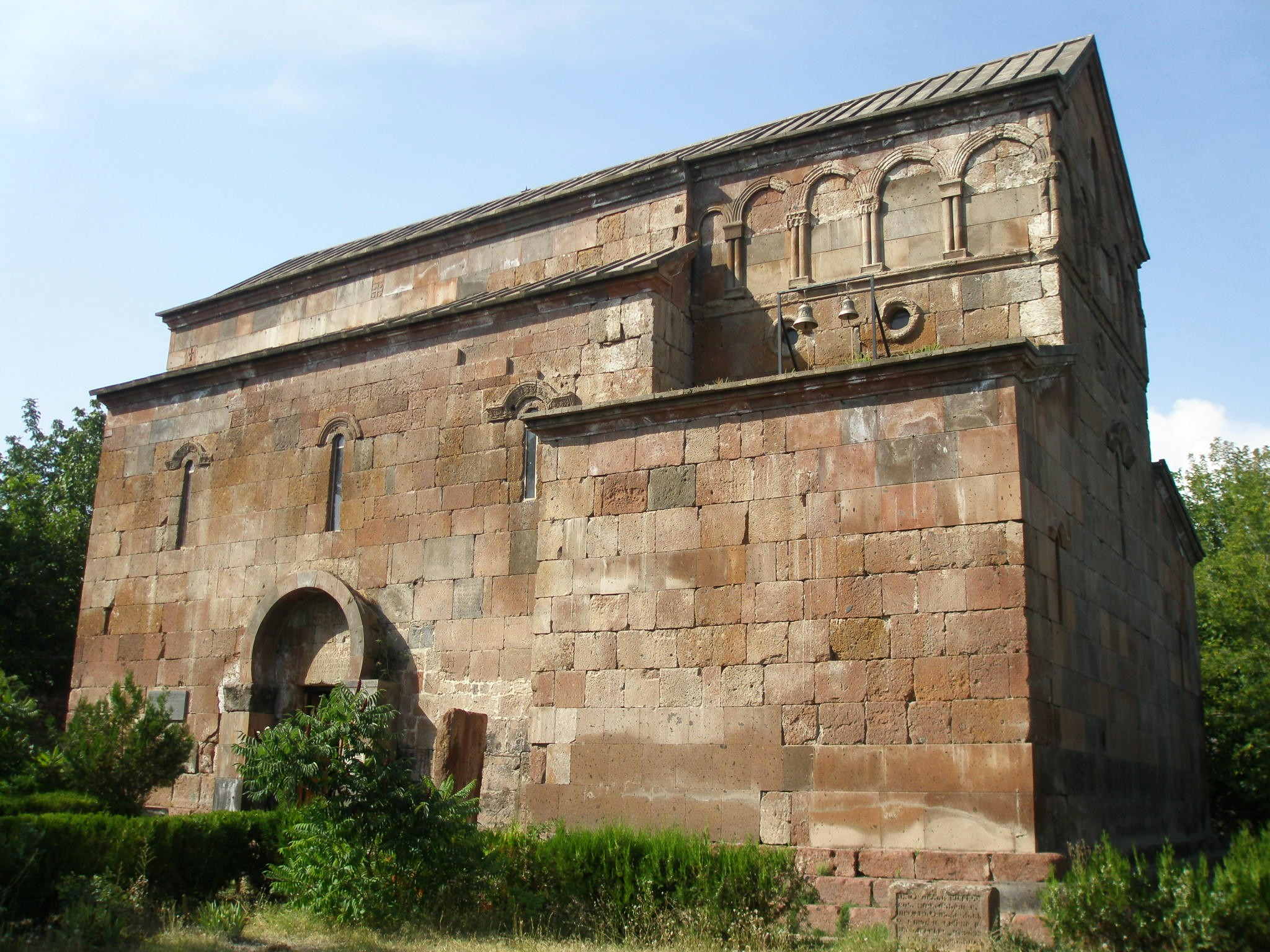
Basilica of S. Hovhannes of the 10th century

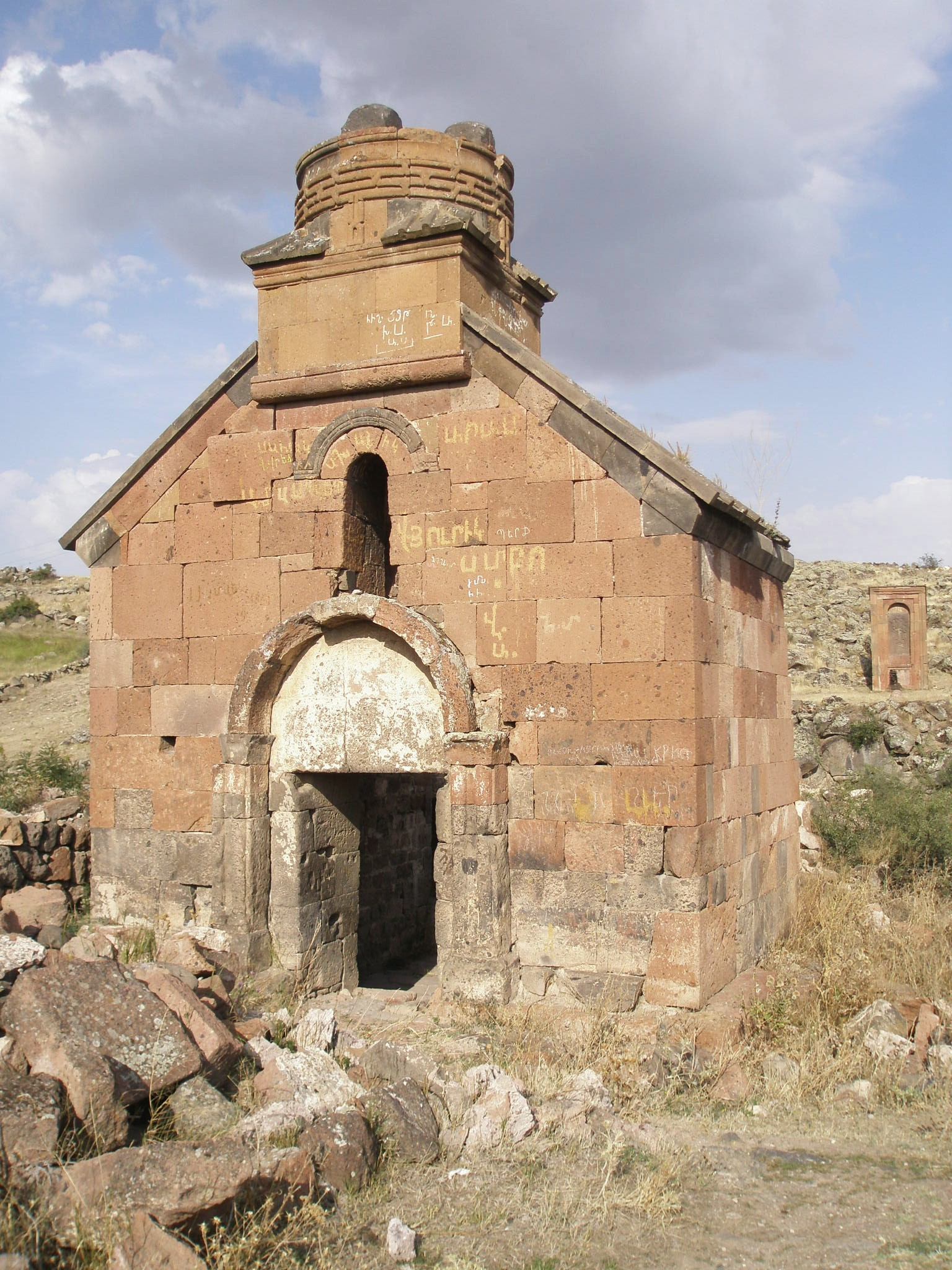
Artavazik Church of the 7th century with huge khachkar monument behind.

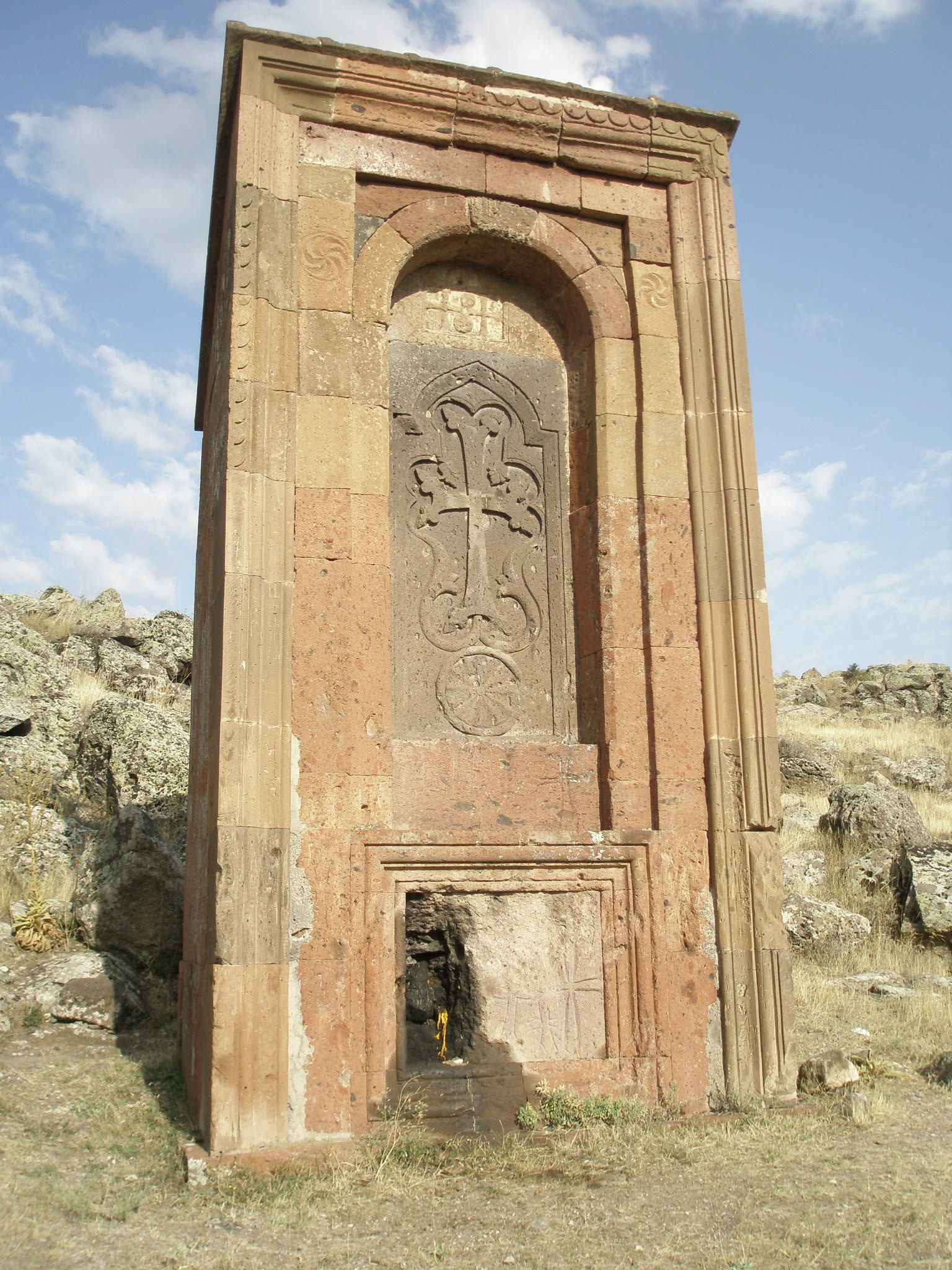
Huge khachkar monument behind Artavazik Church of the 13th century

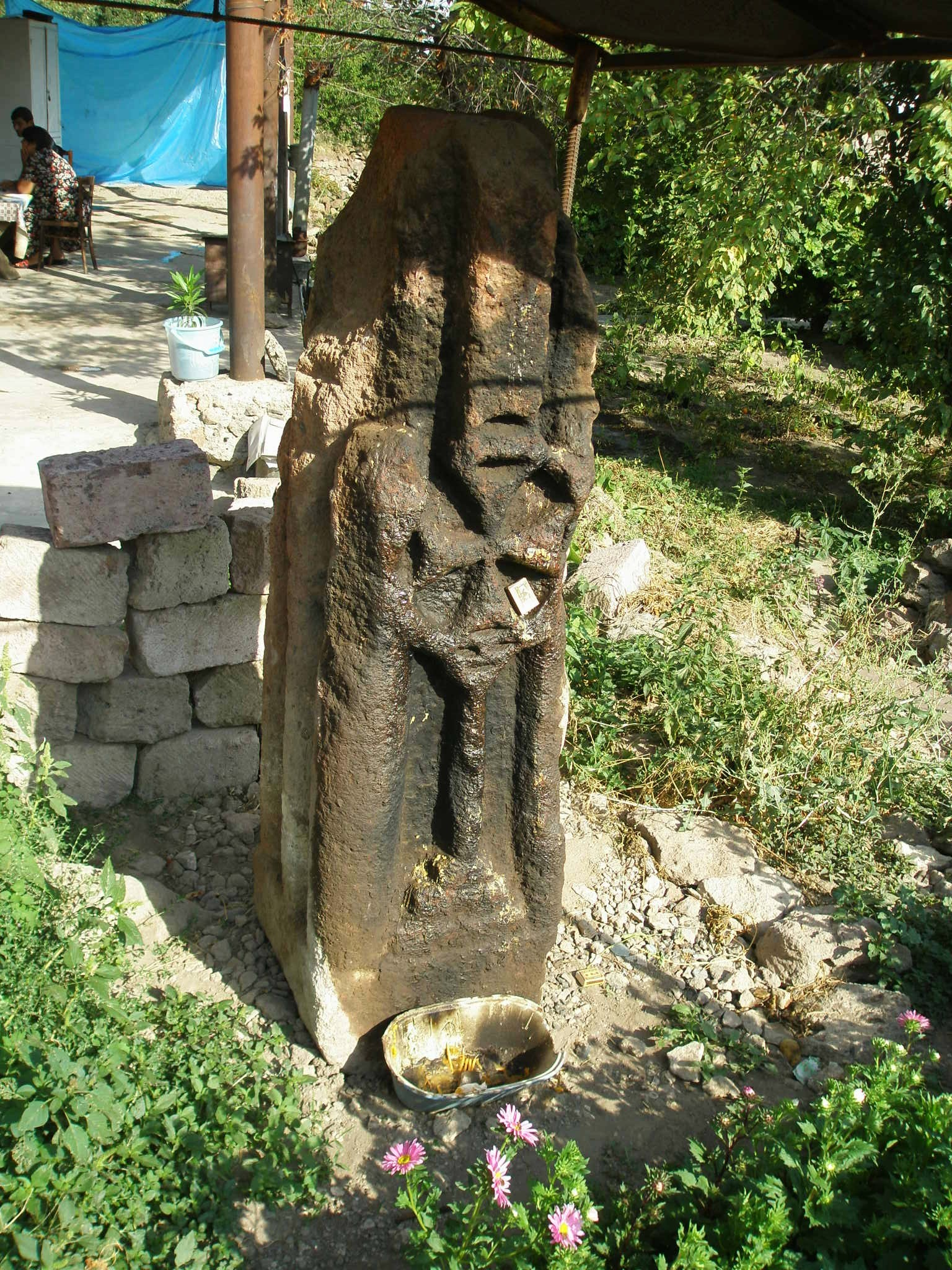
Pillar style khachkar with a Maltese Cross located behind a house in the village.
