= Artavazik Church =

Cultural heritage monument of Armenia

Artavazik Church Արտավազիկ եկեղեցի
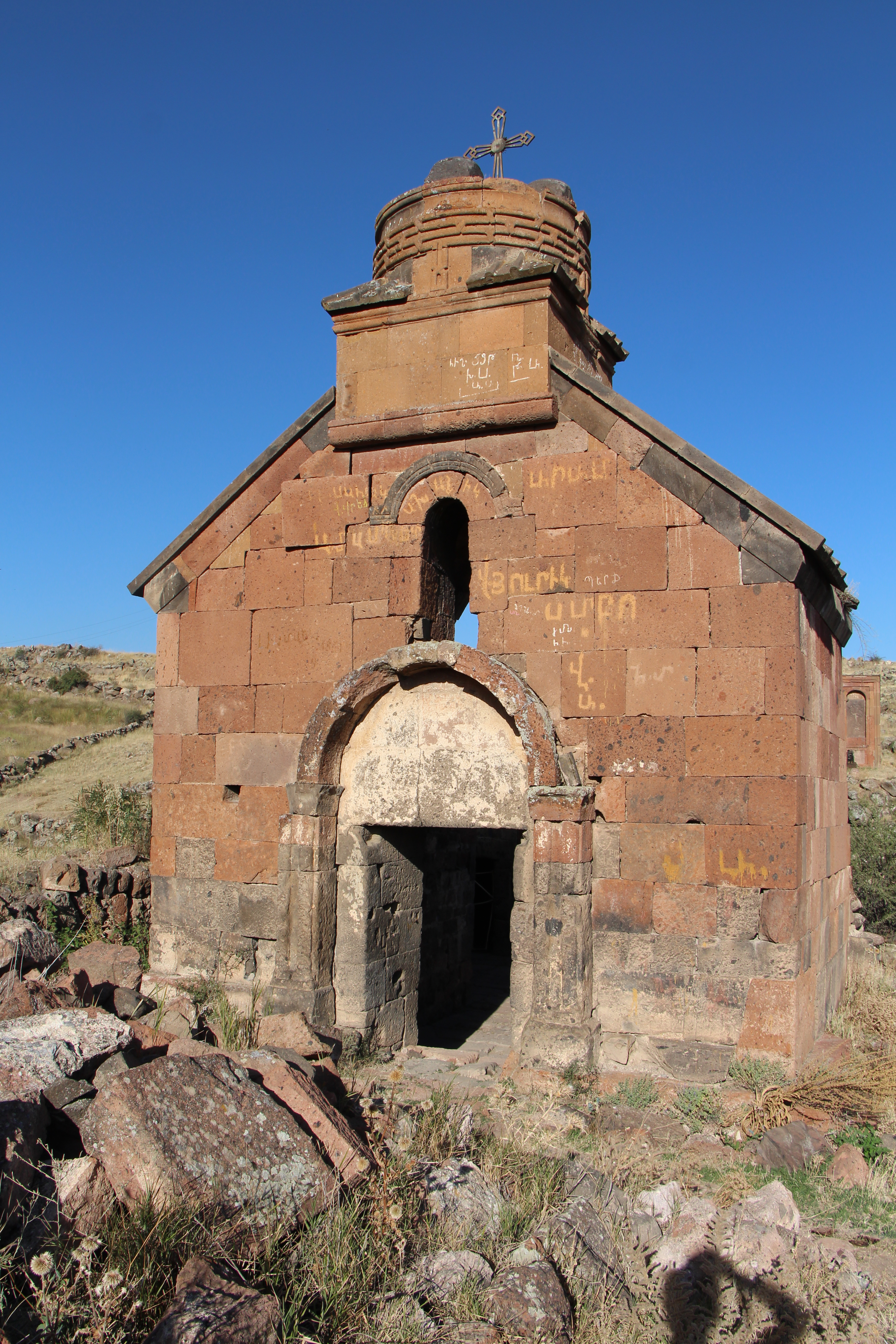
- Artavazik Church with a large khachkar monument seen behind the church across the ravine.

- Location within Armenia Location within Aragatsotn

Religion
- Affiliation: Armenian Apostolic Church
- Status: Inactive, ruins

Location
- Location: Byurakan, Aragatsotn Province, Armenia
- Coordinates: 40.3400°N 44.2703°E

Architecture
- Type: Small cruciform central-plan
- Style: Armenian
- Completed: 7th century, with a 13th-century khachkar monument behind.
- Domes: 1 (collapsed); belfry drum preserved (belfry dome collapsed).

Artavazik Church (Armenian: Արտավազիկ եկեղեցի) of the 7th century is located in a stone field one kilometer northeast just a little outside the village of Byurakan in the Aragatsotn Province of Armenia. The name of the church goes back to the Armenian king at the time, presumed to be the founder.

== Architecture ==
The church is a small cruciform monocoque type structure with a long west arm and semicircular eastern apse that is narrower by far than the other three arms. In the northeast corner adjacent to the apse is a "study" or prayer room. Large portions of walls and a section of the gable roof at the western end are preserved, as well as a large section of the lower-drum of a belfry that rests above the front entry. The belfry had been added in the 13th century but has recently collapsed. Four tall and thin columns stood on the rim of a lower drum and once supported a slightly narrower upper drum with a small conical dome above. A small portion of their footings may still be seen attached to the base drum. These lower and upper drums were both decorated with interwoven geometric knot designs that encircled the structural elements. There was originally a large octagonal drum and dome that stood above the center of the church before the collapse of its main roof. Close to the church to the southwest are the remains of the badly damaged main dome.

Behind the church and across a small ravine is a huge khachkar monument from the 13th century with a shed roof at the rear.

== Gallery ==
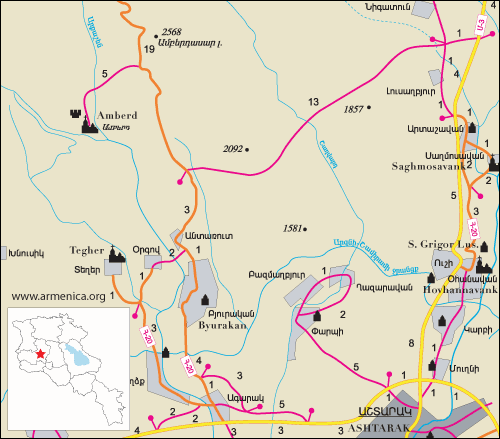
Road map of Byurakan and surrounding region.

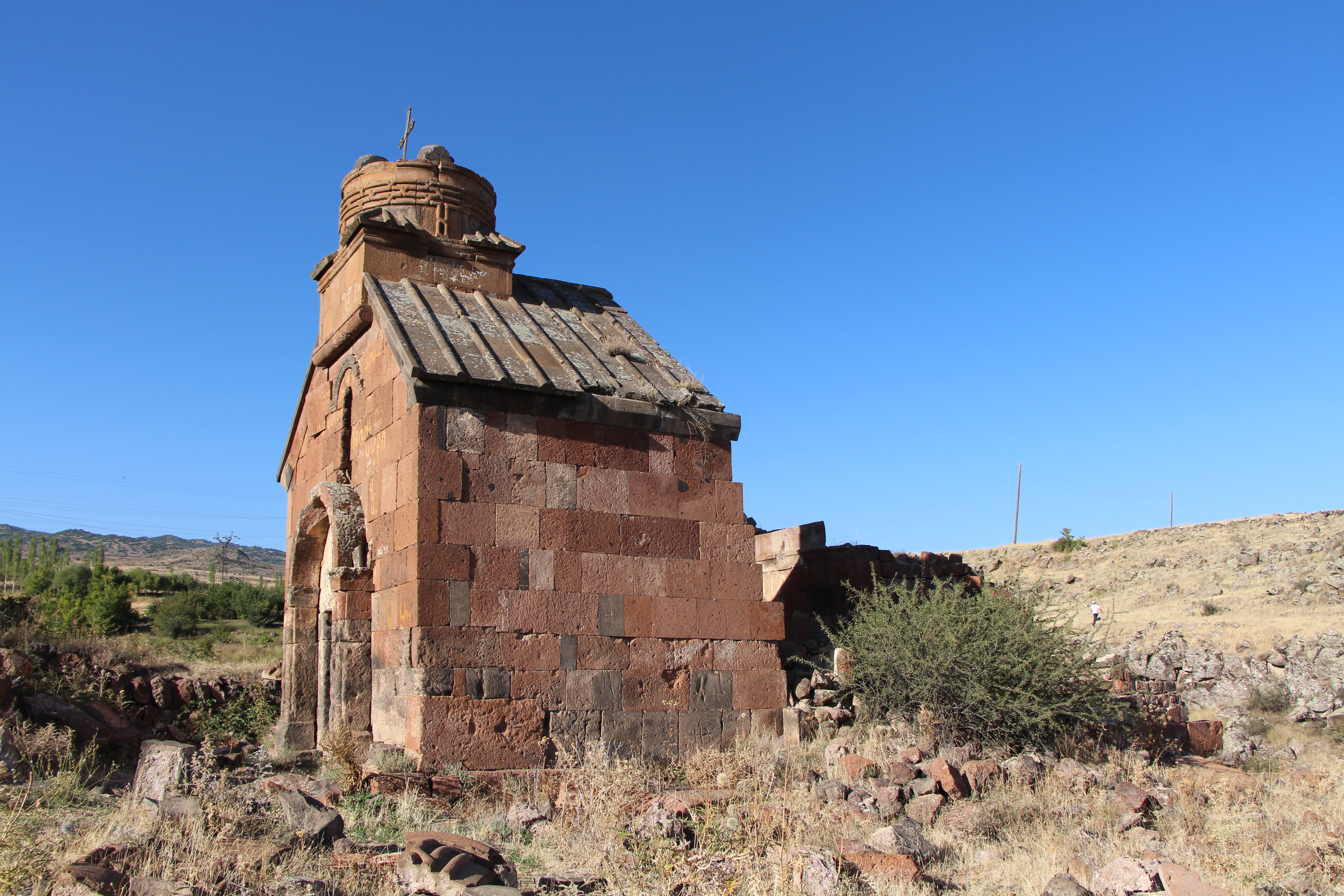
Southern exterior wall.

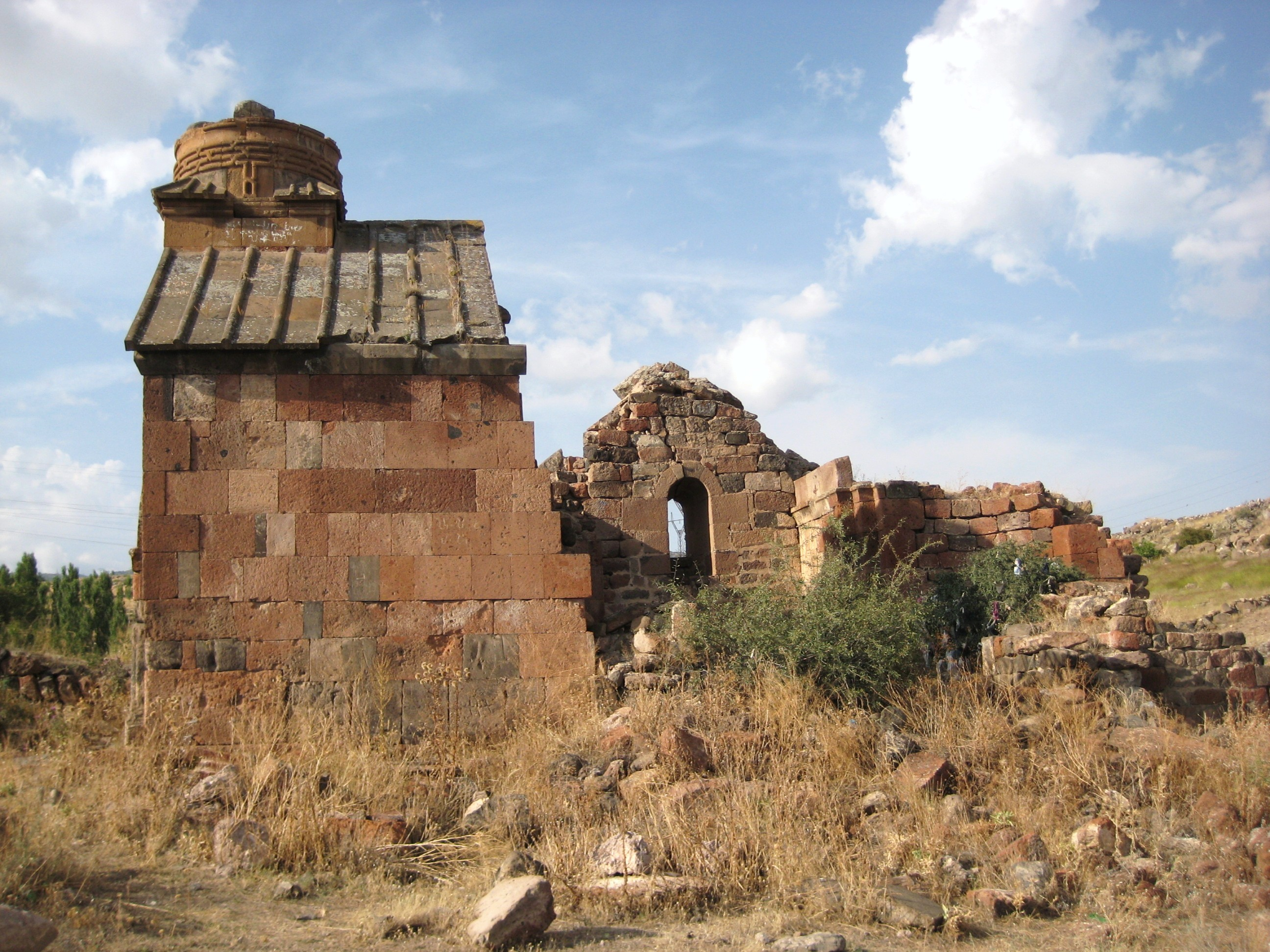
Southern exterior wall.

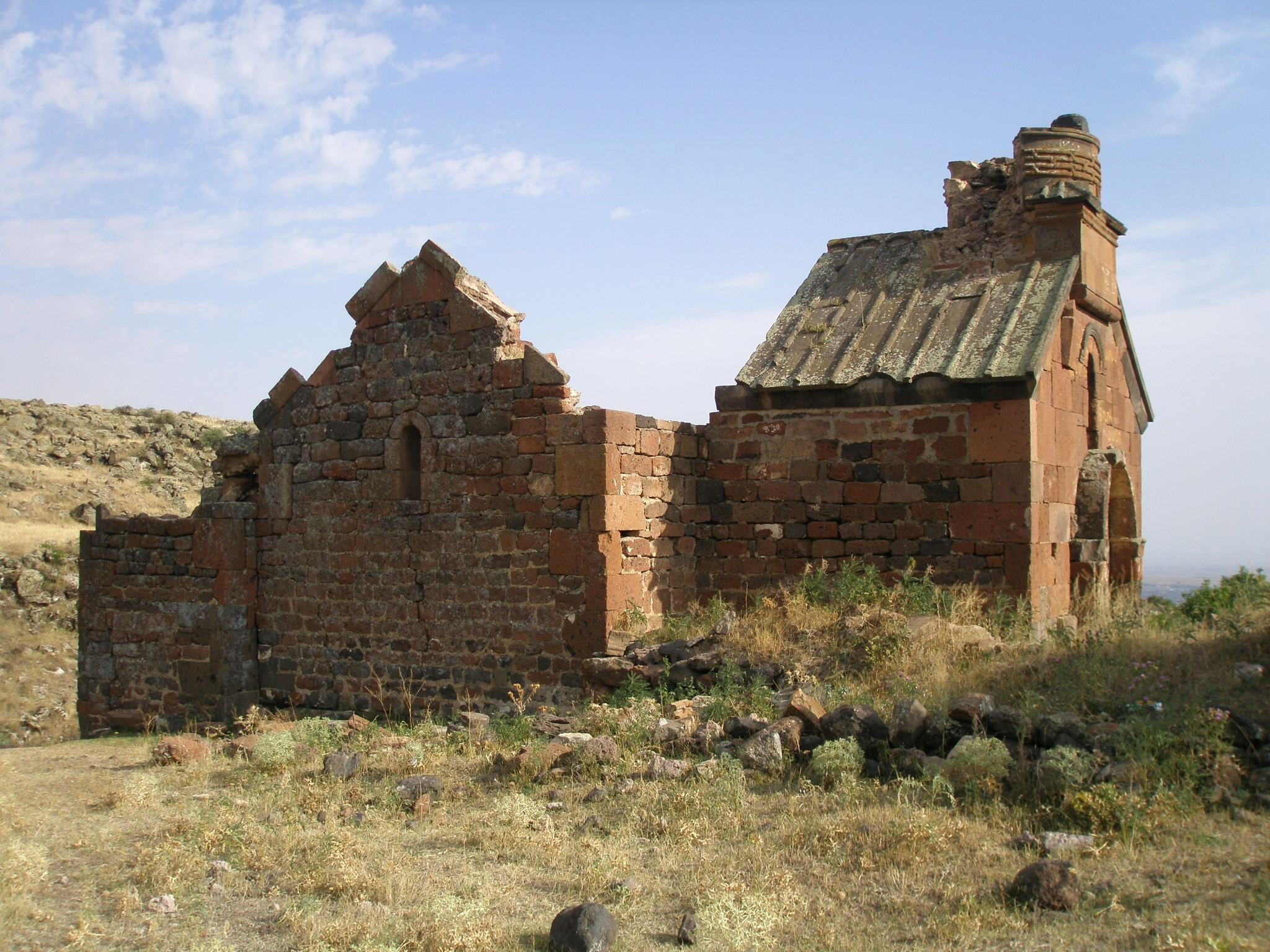
Northern exterior wall.

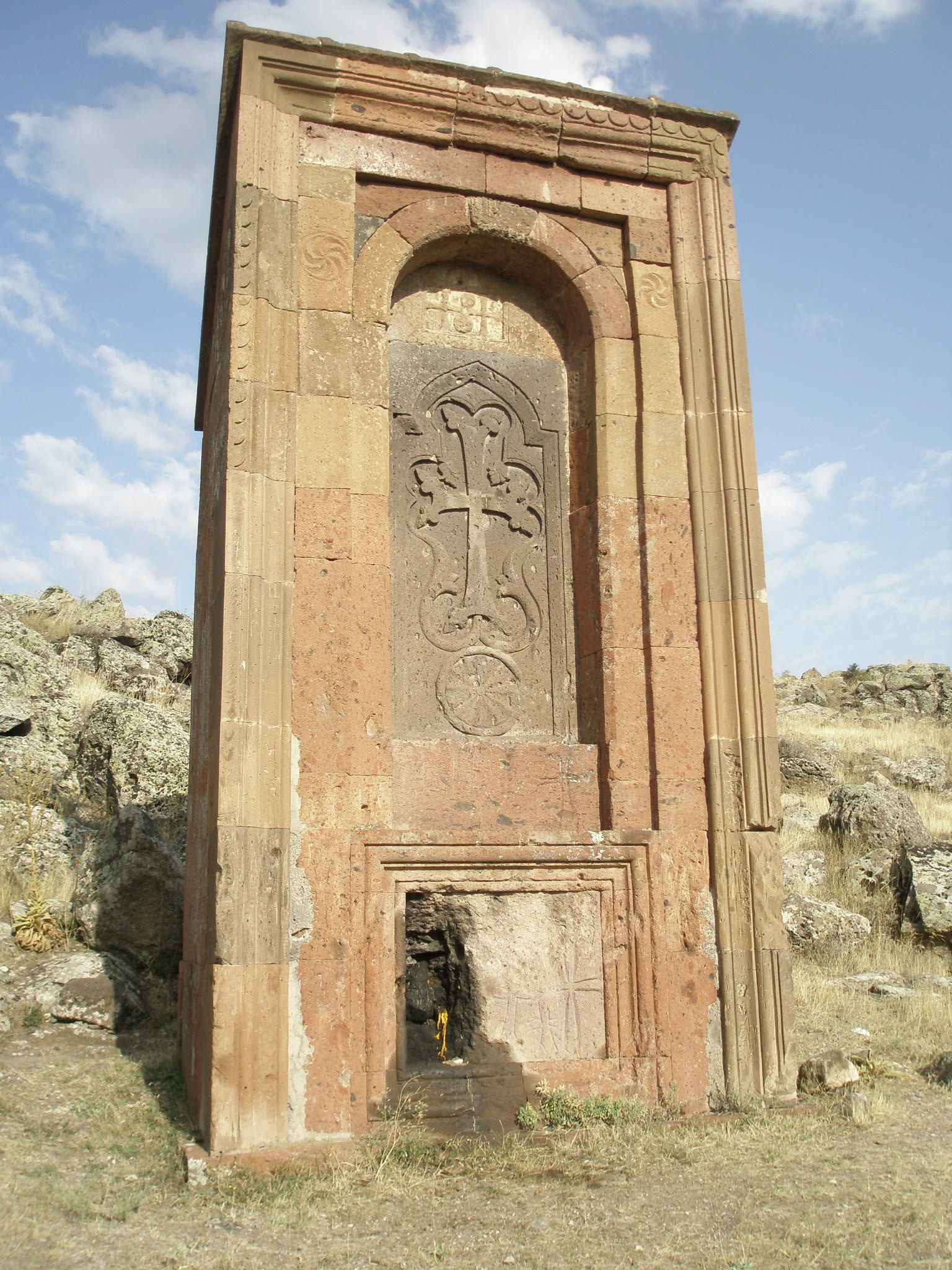
Huge 13th-century khachkar monument located behind the church across the small ravine.

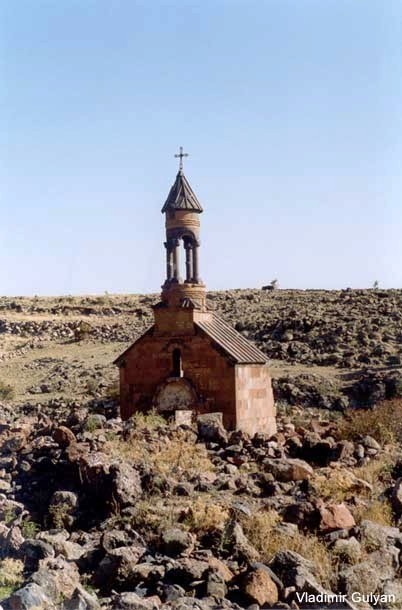
Front view with belfry still intact. (Photo taken prior to 2005)

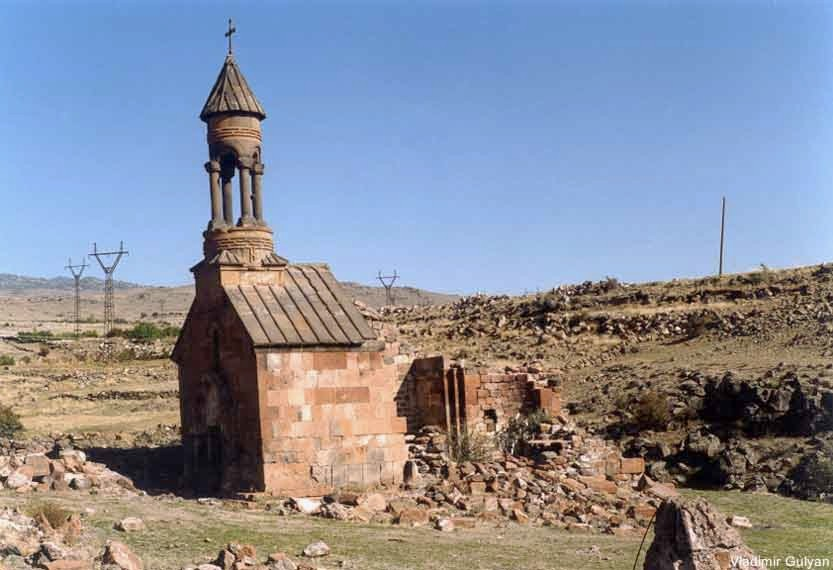
Side view with belfry still intact. (Photo taken prior to 2005)

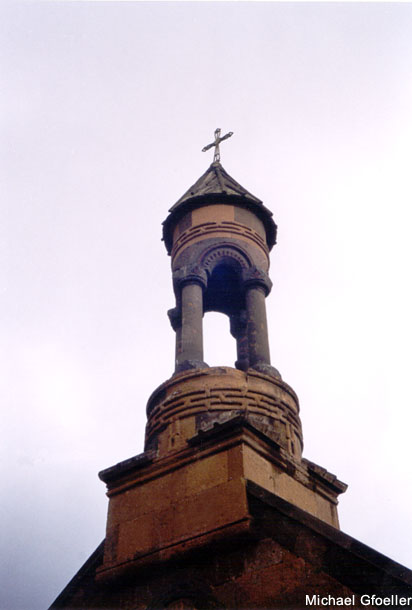
Detailed view of the belfry. (Photo taken prior to 2005)
