= Tegher, Armenia =

Tegher Տեղեր
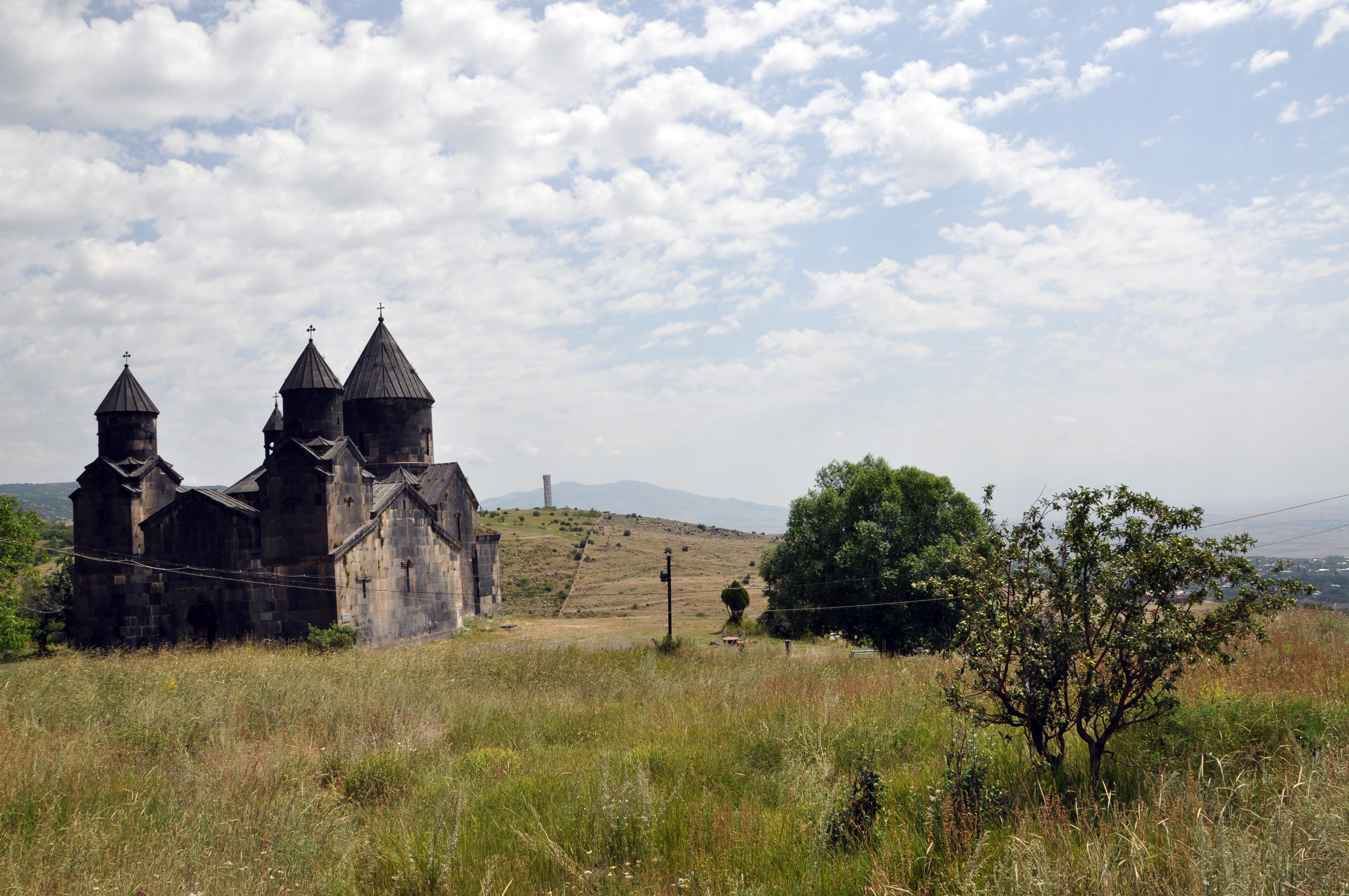
- Tegher Monastery

- Location within Armenia Location within Aragatsotn
- Coordinates: 40°20′43″N 44°14′11″E
- Country: Armenia
- Province: Aragatsotn
- Municipality: Ashtarak
- Elevation: 1,710 m (5,610 ft)

Population (2011)
  - Total: 57
- Time zone: UTC+4
  - Summer (DST): UTC+5

Tegher (Armenian: Տեղեր) is a village in the Ashtarak Municipality of the Aragatsotn Province of Armenia on the southern slope of Mount Aragats.

The town contains the Monastery of Tegher built in 1213. The ruins of the 9th century village of Tegher (Old Tegher) sit a short distance walk from the monastery. Numerous foundations may be seen, along with the remains of a Tukh Manuk funerary chapel of the 5th century. Nearby is also a medieval to 19th century cemetery with some mausoleums and khachkars.

Nearby is also a large radio telescope as well as an unfinished solar power plant, both from the Soviet era.

== Gallery ==
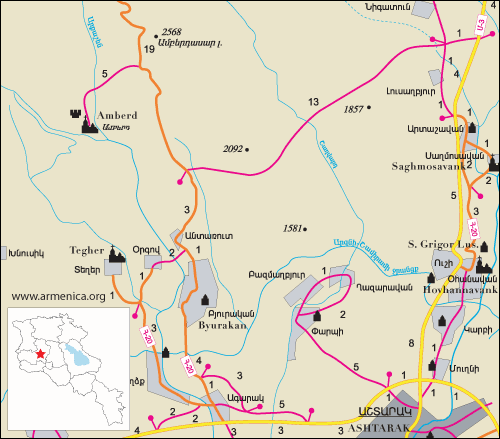
Road map of Tegher and the surrounding region.

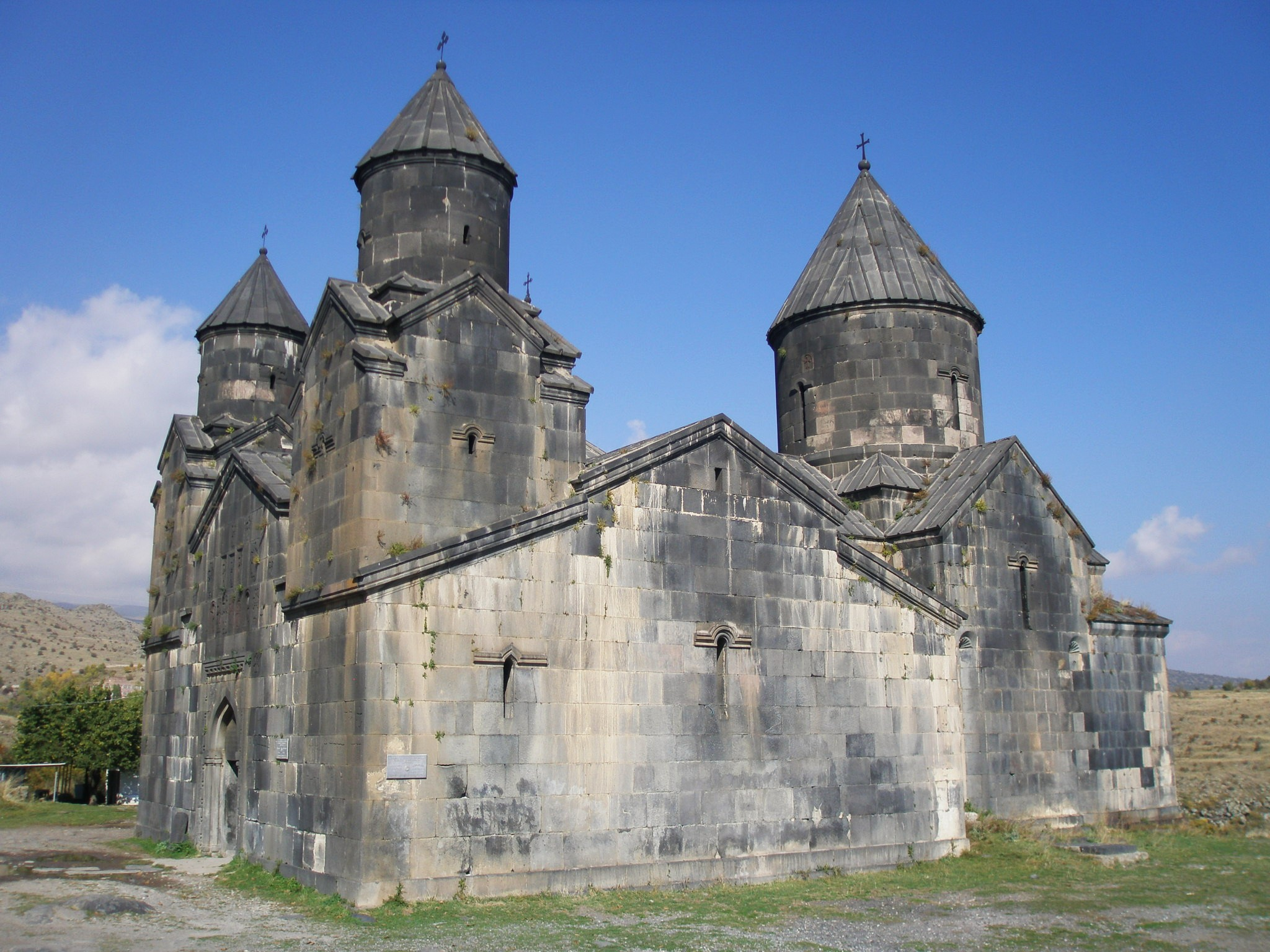
Tegher Monastery

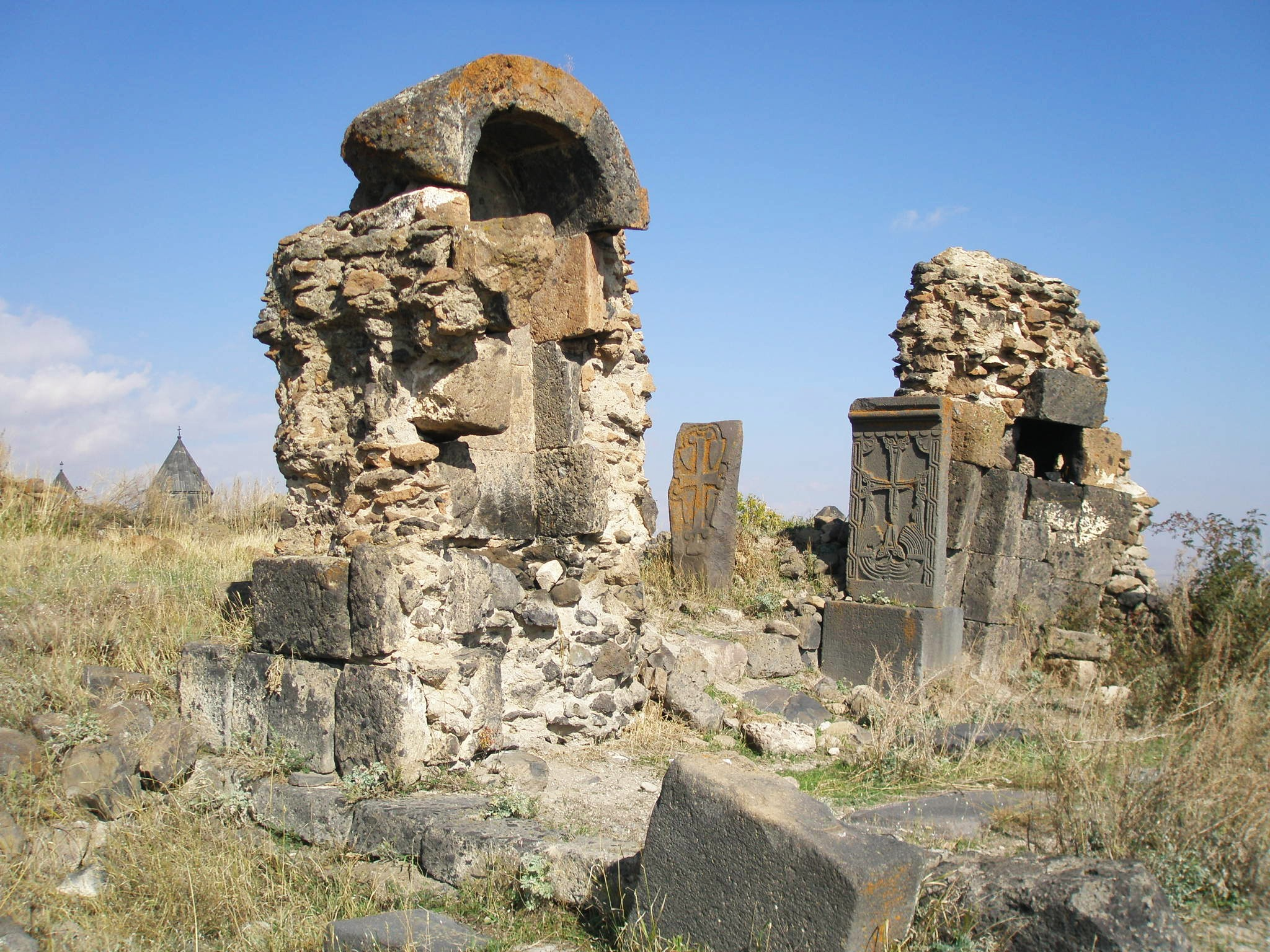
5th century Tukh Manuk Chapel ruins near the monastic complex.

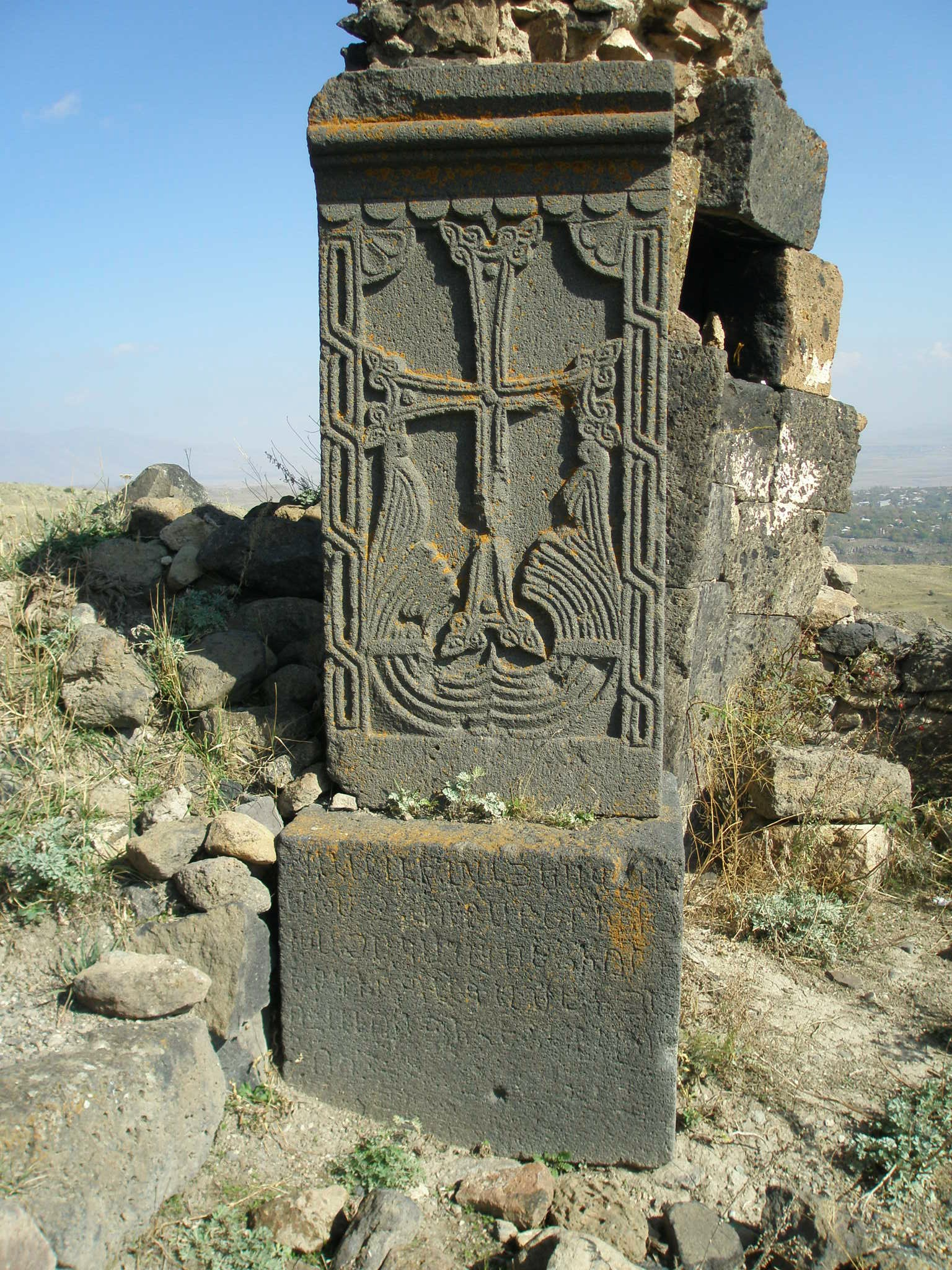
Khachkar at the chapel.

== Demographics ==
| Year | 1831 | 1873 | 1897 | 1922 | 1926 | 1931 | 1939 | 1959 | 2001 | 2011 |
| Population | 35 | 364 | 459 | 506 | 408 | 367 | 655 | 554 | 90 | 57 |
