= Saint Gevork Monastery of Mughni =

Monastery in Armenia

Saint Gevork Monastery Սուրբ Գեւորգ Վանք
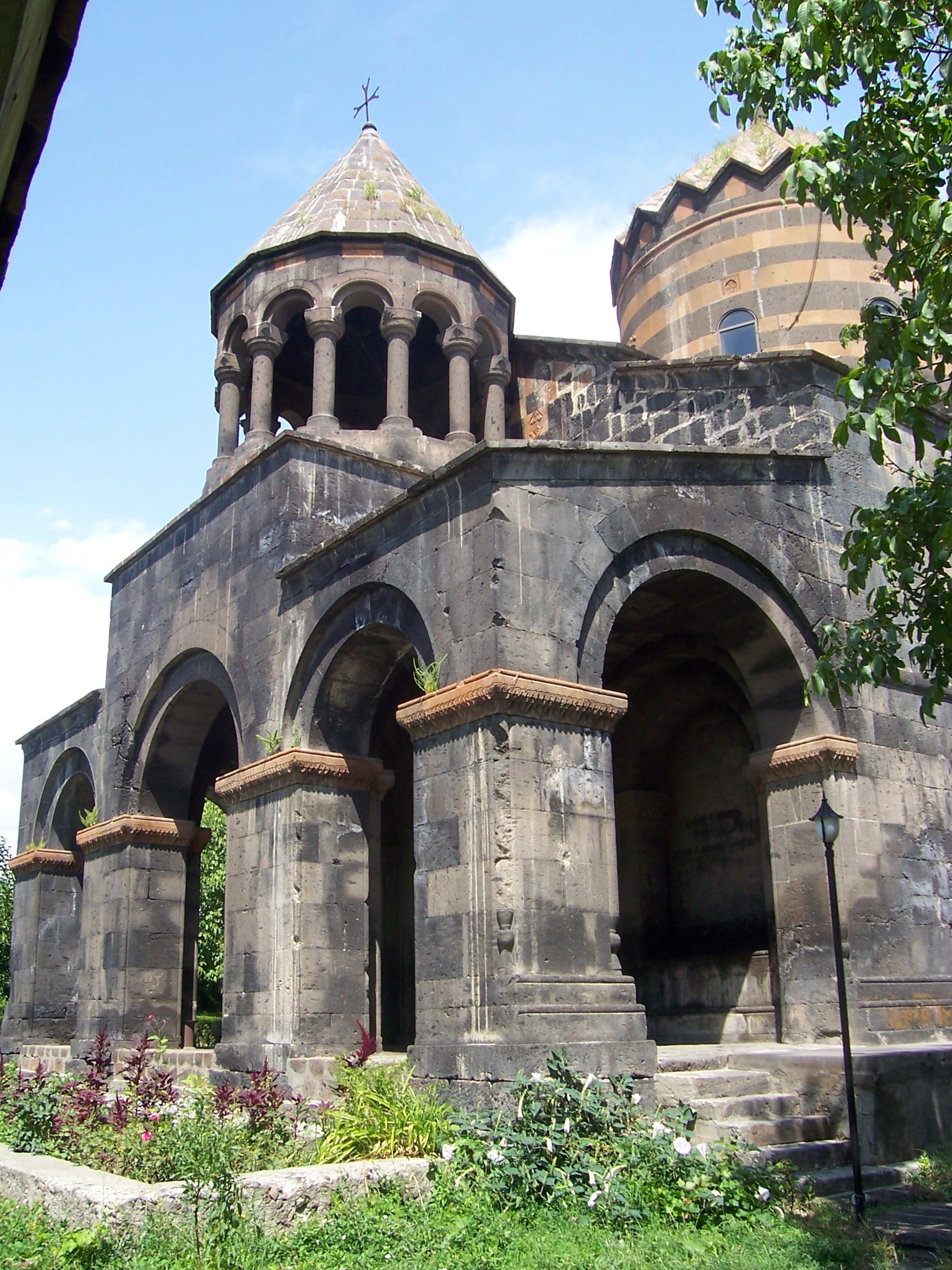
- The Church of Saint Gevork

- Location within Armenia Location within Aragatsotn

Religion
- Affiliation: Armenian Apostolic Church

Location
- Location: Mughni, Aragatsotn Province, Armenia
- Coordinates: 40.315001°N 44.371628°E

Architecture
- Architects: Reconstruction: Sahak Khizanetsi and his successor Murat
- Type: Cruciform central-plan inside; Rectangular plan outside
- Style: Armenian
- Completed: 14th century. Reconstruction of the drum and dome 1661-1669
- Dome: 1

Saint Gevork Monastery or Saint George's Monastery of Mughni (Armenian: Սուրբ Գեւորգ Եկեղեցի or Սուրբ Գեւորգ Վանք; pronounced Surp Gevork) is located just off the main road that runs through the village of Mughni near Ashtarak in the Aragatsotn Province of Armenia. It was built to house some of the remains of Saint George who was known as the "Slayer of Dragons".

== Architecture ==
The church of Saint Gevork stands within a rectangular walled monastery. It has a single cylindrical drum notable for the horizontal alternating striped pattern that surrounds it, and a conical umbrella type dome above. The striped pattern repeats some within the interior portion of the dome. The front façade is made up of a triple-arched walkway with an arch on either side adjacent that leads underneath a belfry. The belfry consists of sixteen equally spaced columns with an equal amount of smaller arches that support the weight of the cupola above.

A main portal leads into the church decorated by an intricately carved arched lintel and door frame. Another smaller doorway is located on the façade to the right of the front of the church. It is almost as intricately carved as the main entry door.

Many portions of the stonework on the church of Saint Gevork use two colors of stone; a darker grey tuff and an apricot colored tuff. In particular the doorways, the drum, the peaks of the façades, and the capitals of the rectangular columns of the triple-archway in front are accentuated by the alternating stone colors.

In the interior of the church there are numerous religious frescoes around the apse and on the left wall leading to the tomb of S. George of whom the church is named after. They were most likely painted in the 17th century by Naghash Hovnatan whose other works include decoration of the Etchmiadzin Cathedral and other churches near Yerevan and Agulis. A single marble tomb sits in a room adjacent to the apse with semi-circular stone of green marble on top worn down from the many people who have touched it. It is said to come from Jerusalem. A chapel built in the 6th century had at one point served to house the remains of S. George, but was later replaced by the church of Saint Gevork.

== Gallery ==
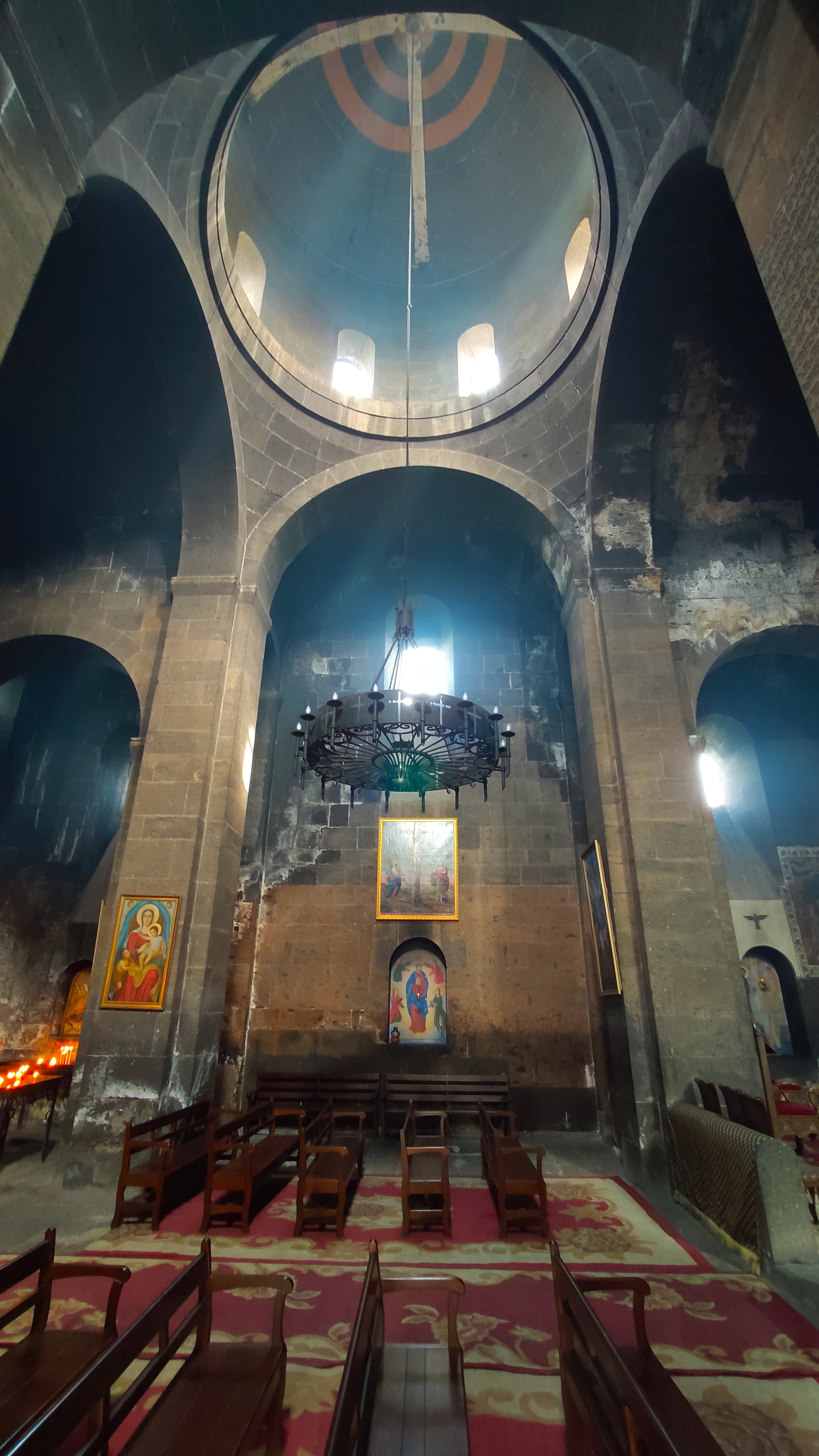
Մուղնու Սբ. Գևորգ եկեղեցու ներքին տեսքը

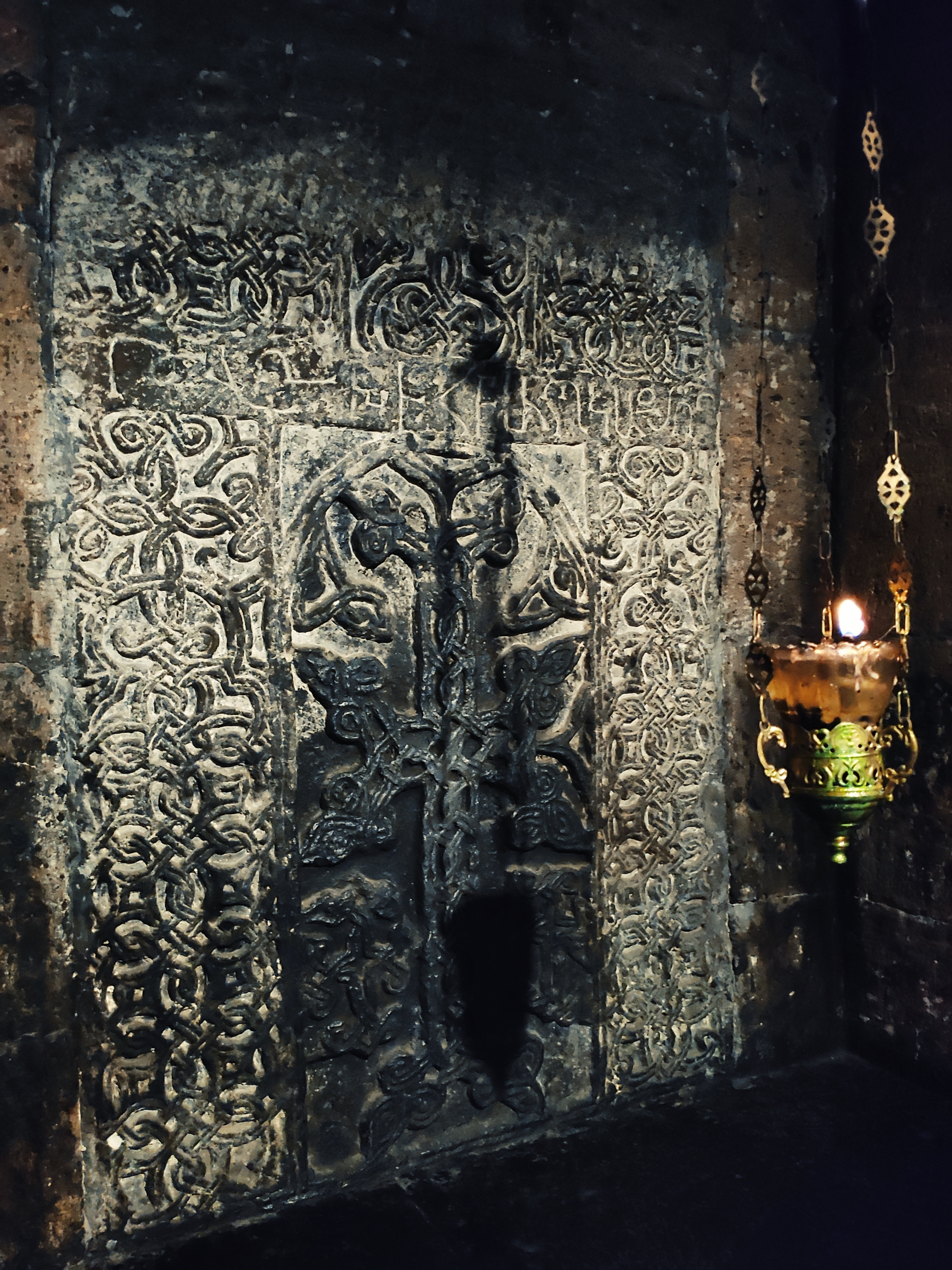
Խաչքար Մուղնու Սբ. Գևորգ եկեղեցու ներսում

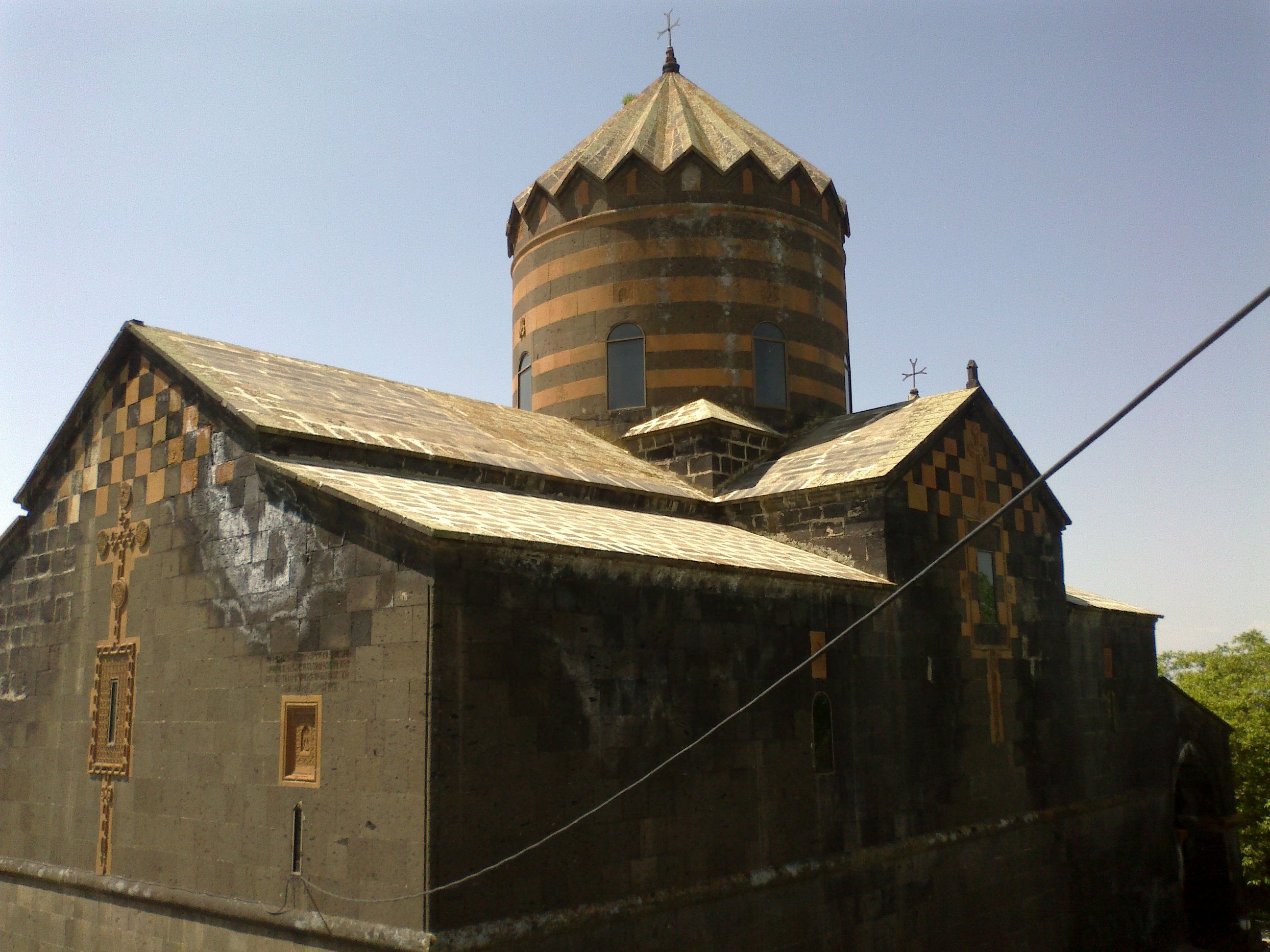

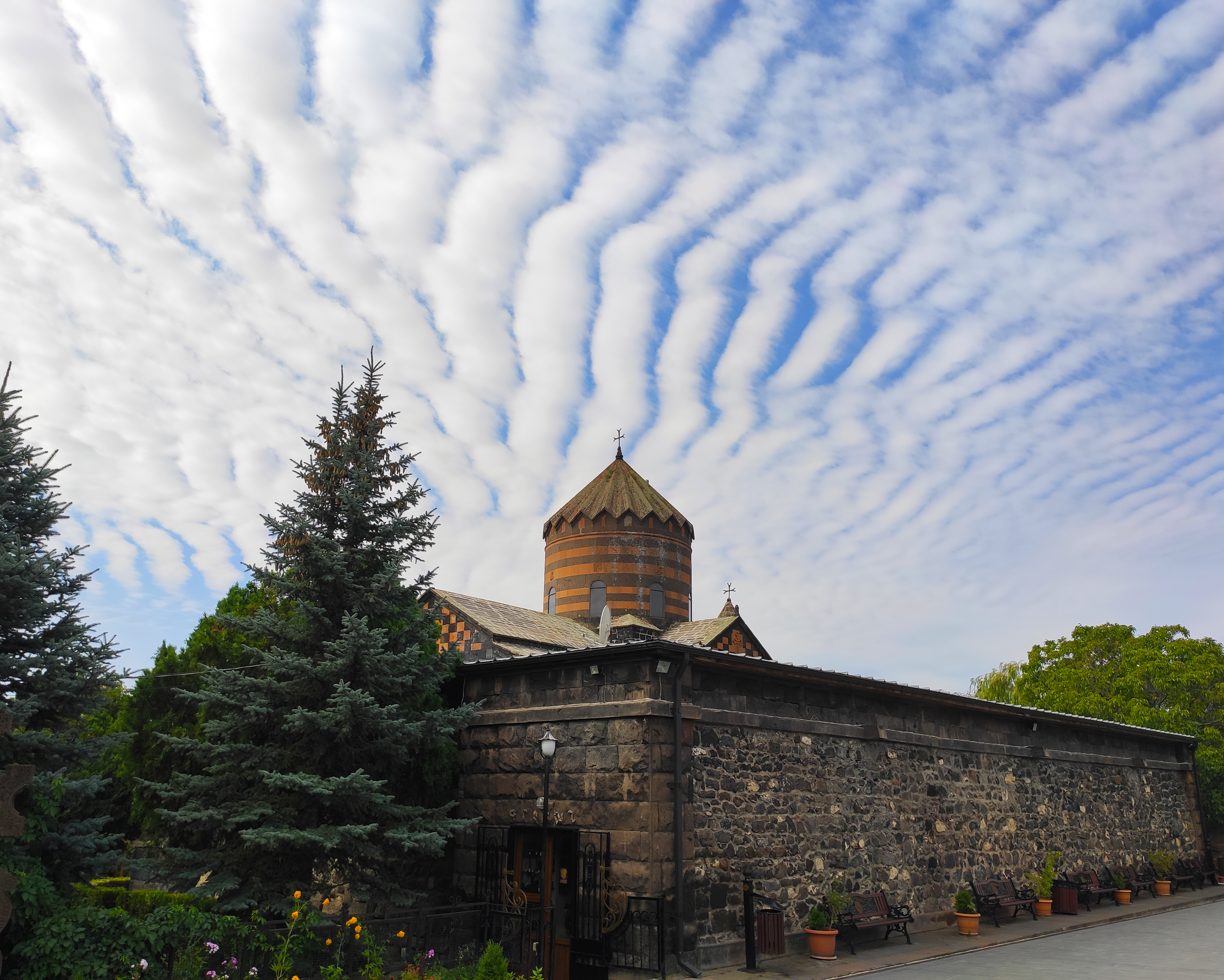
Մուղնու Սբ. Գևորգ եկեղեցու արտաքին տեսքը

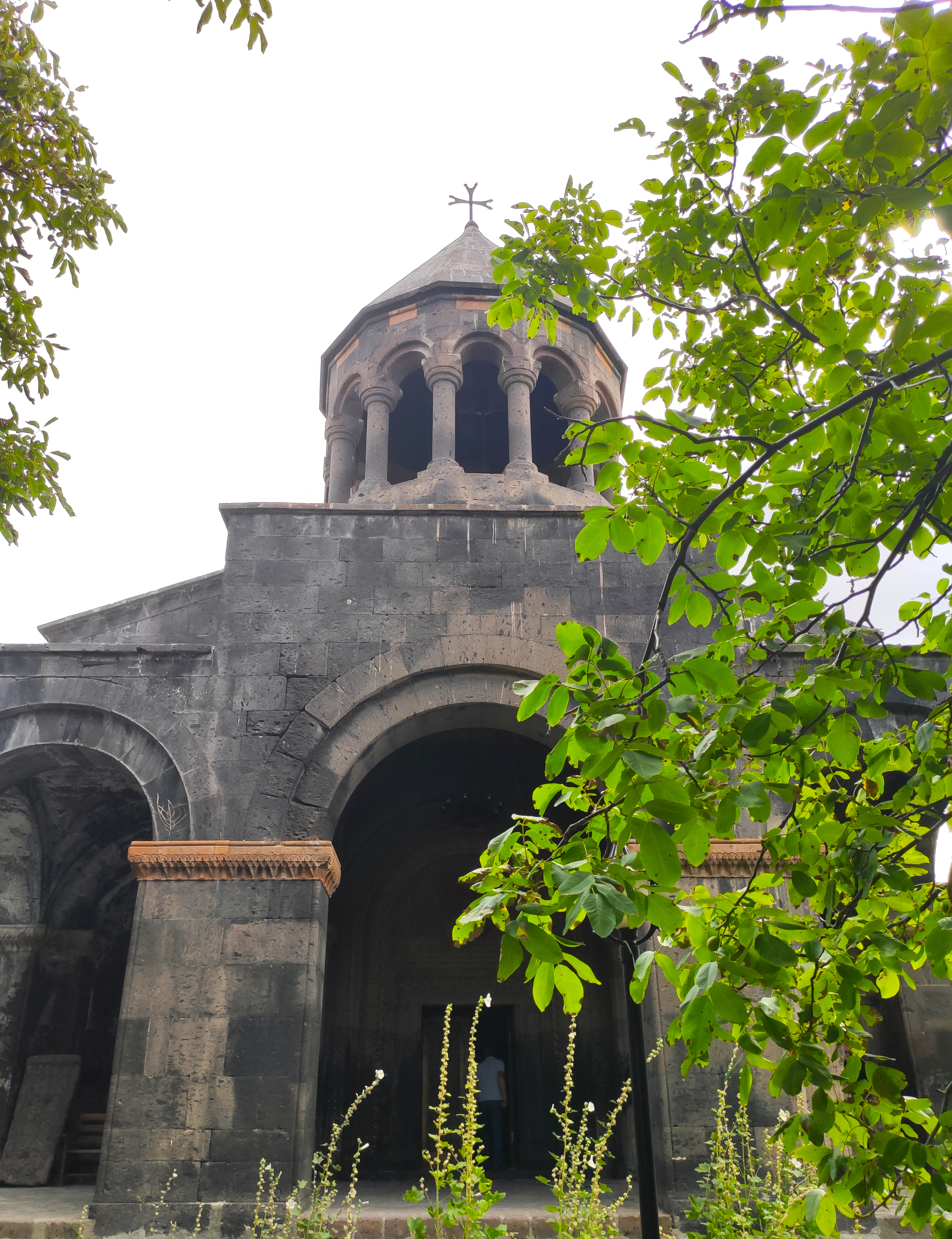
Մուղնու Սբ. Գևորգ եկեղեցու արտաքին տեսքը

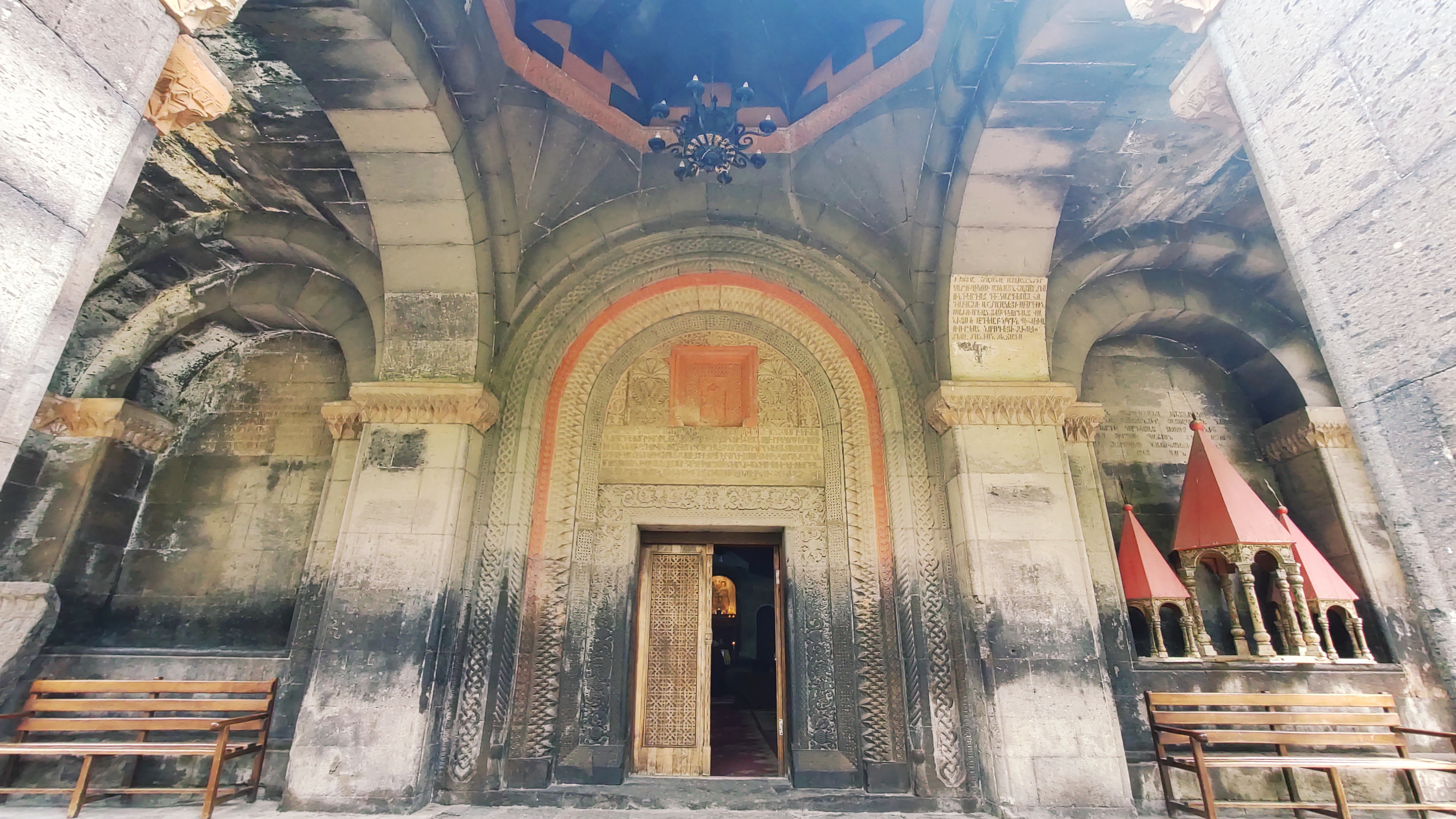
Մուղնու Սբ. Գևորգ եկեղեցու մուտքը

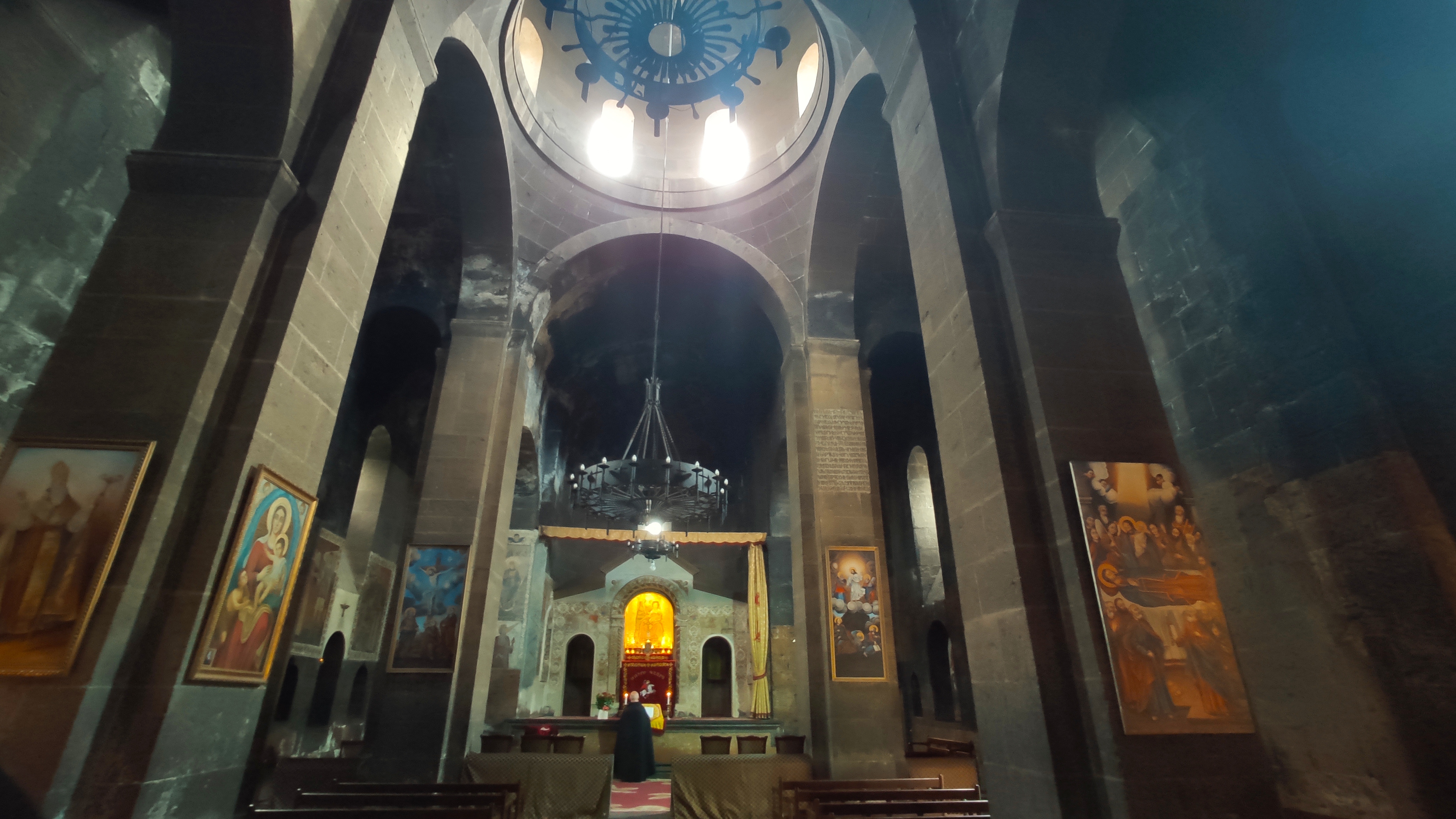
Մուղնու Սբ. Գևորգ եկեղեցու ներքին տեսքը և խորանը

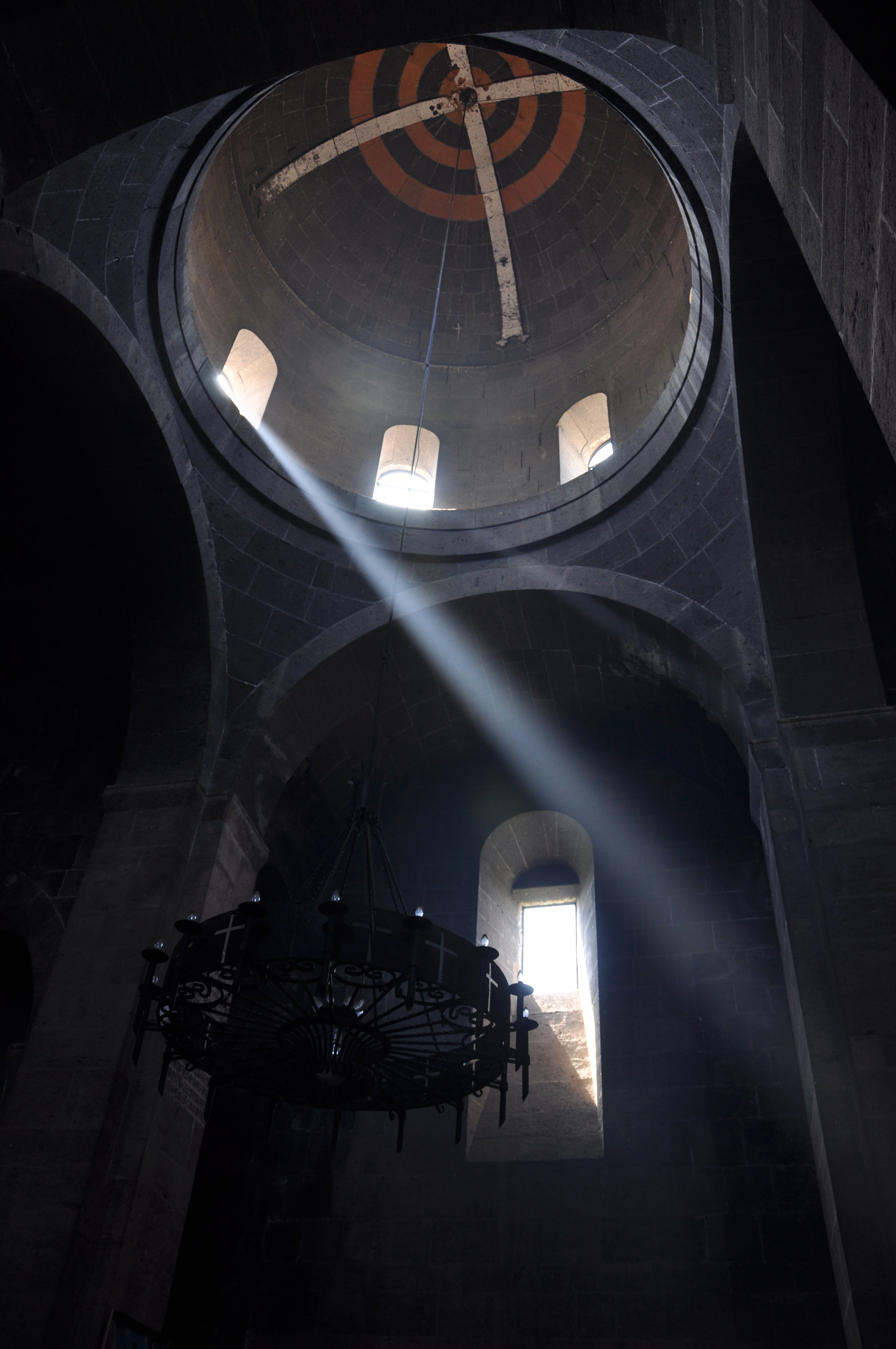
Interior of the dome.

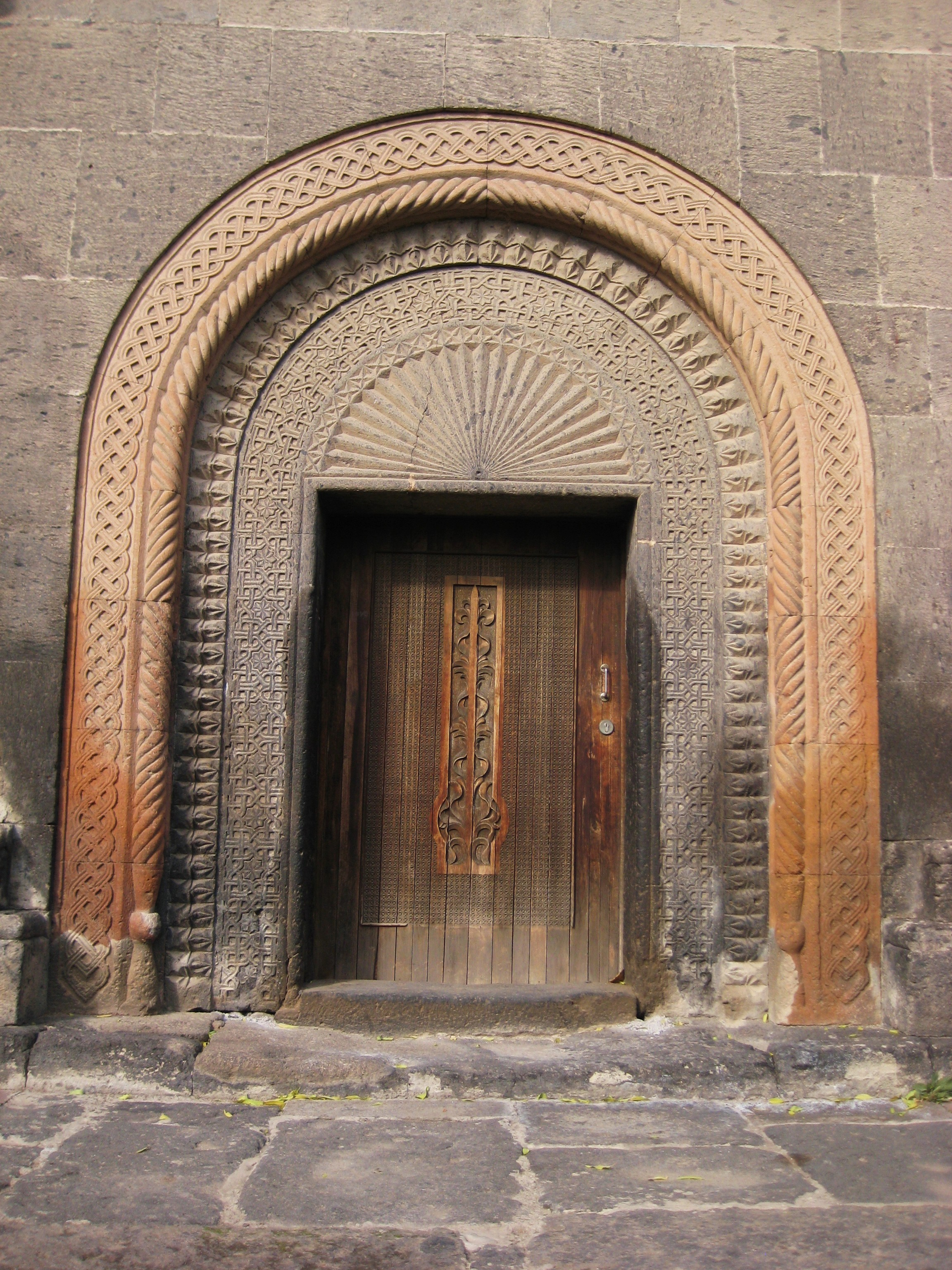
Side portal of the church

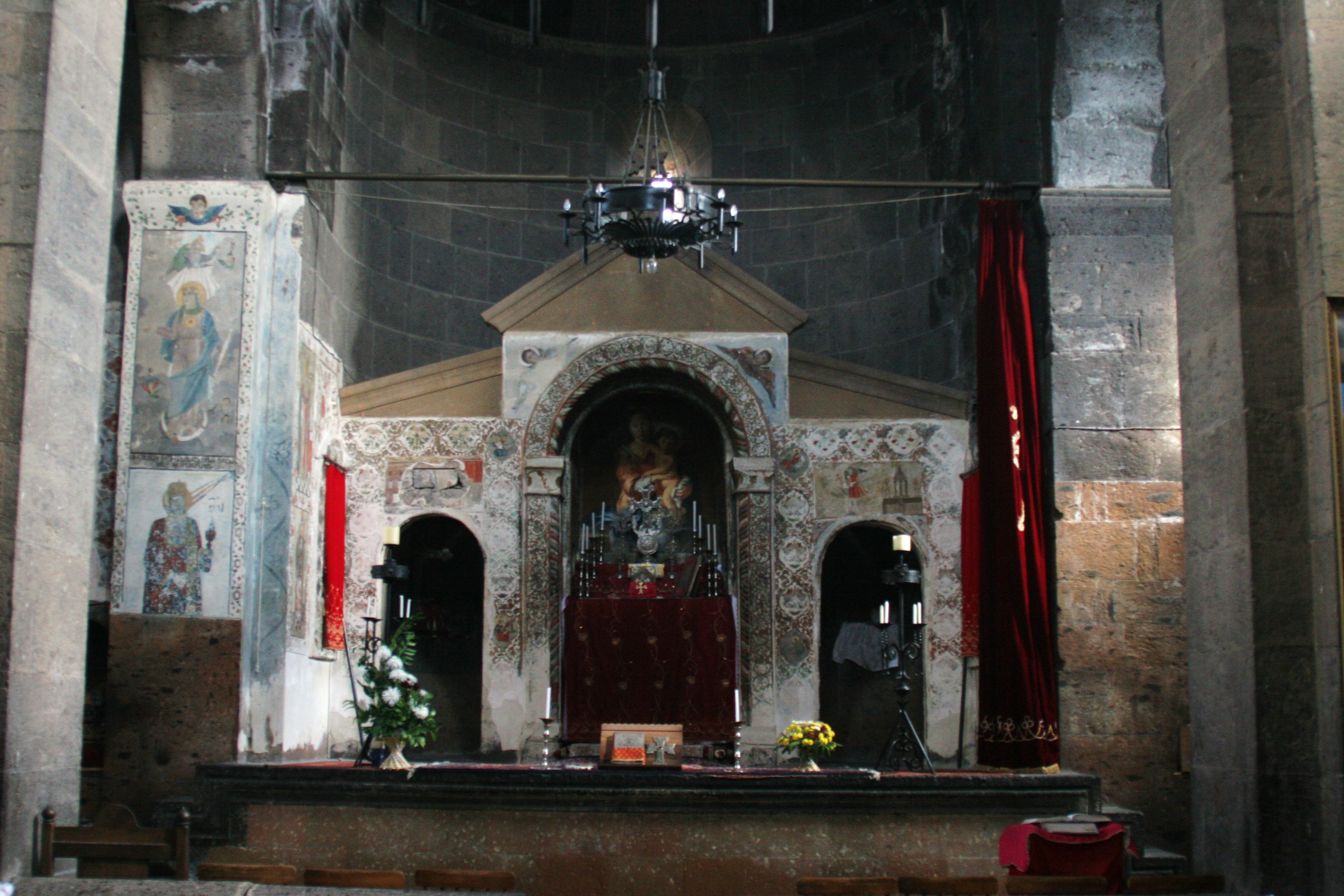
Interior frescoes at the apse

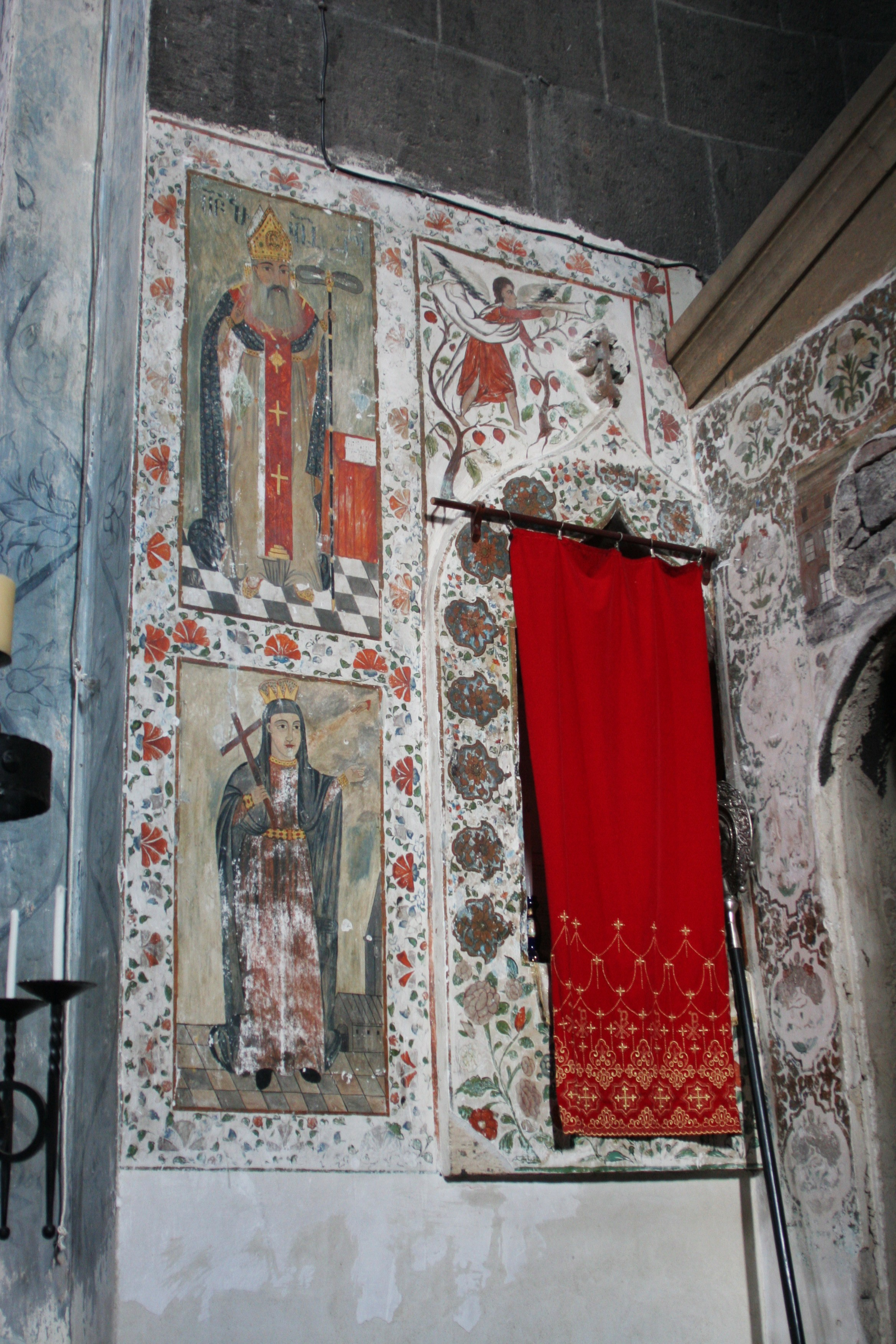
Interior frescoes

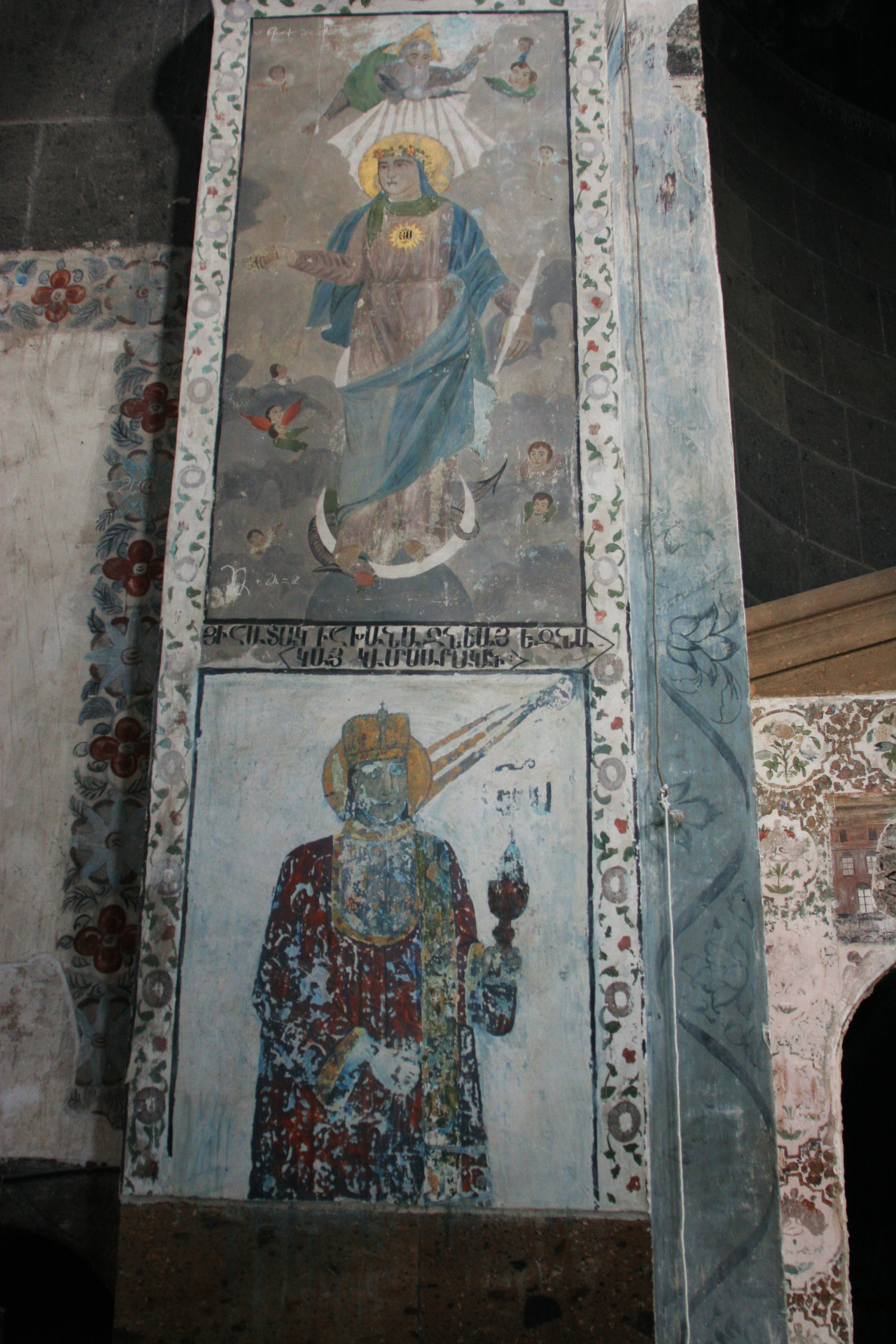
Interior frescoes

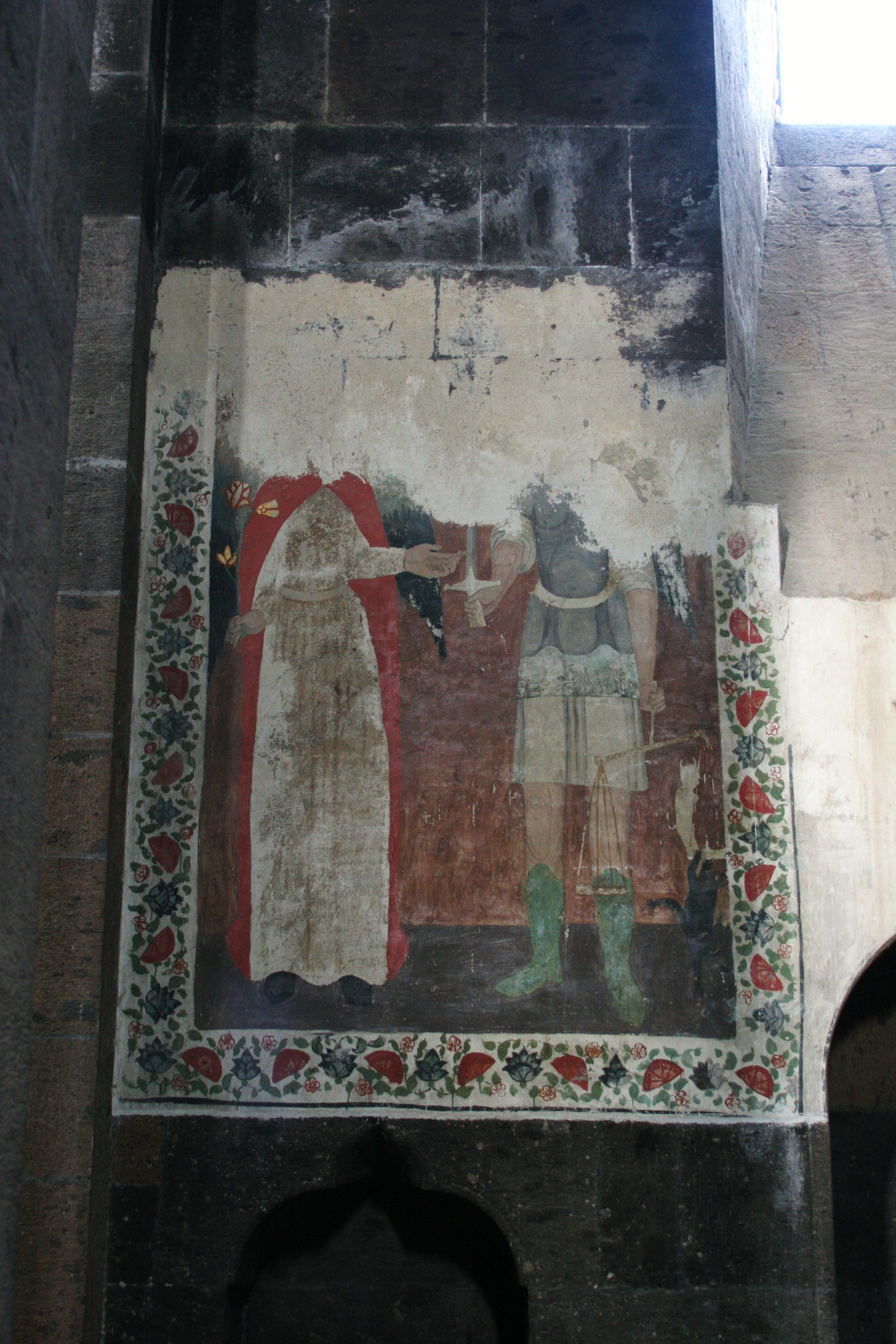
Interior frescoes

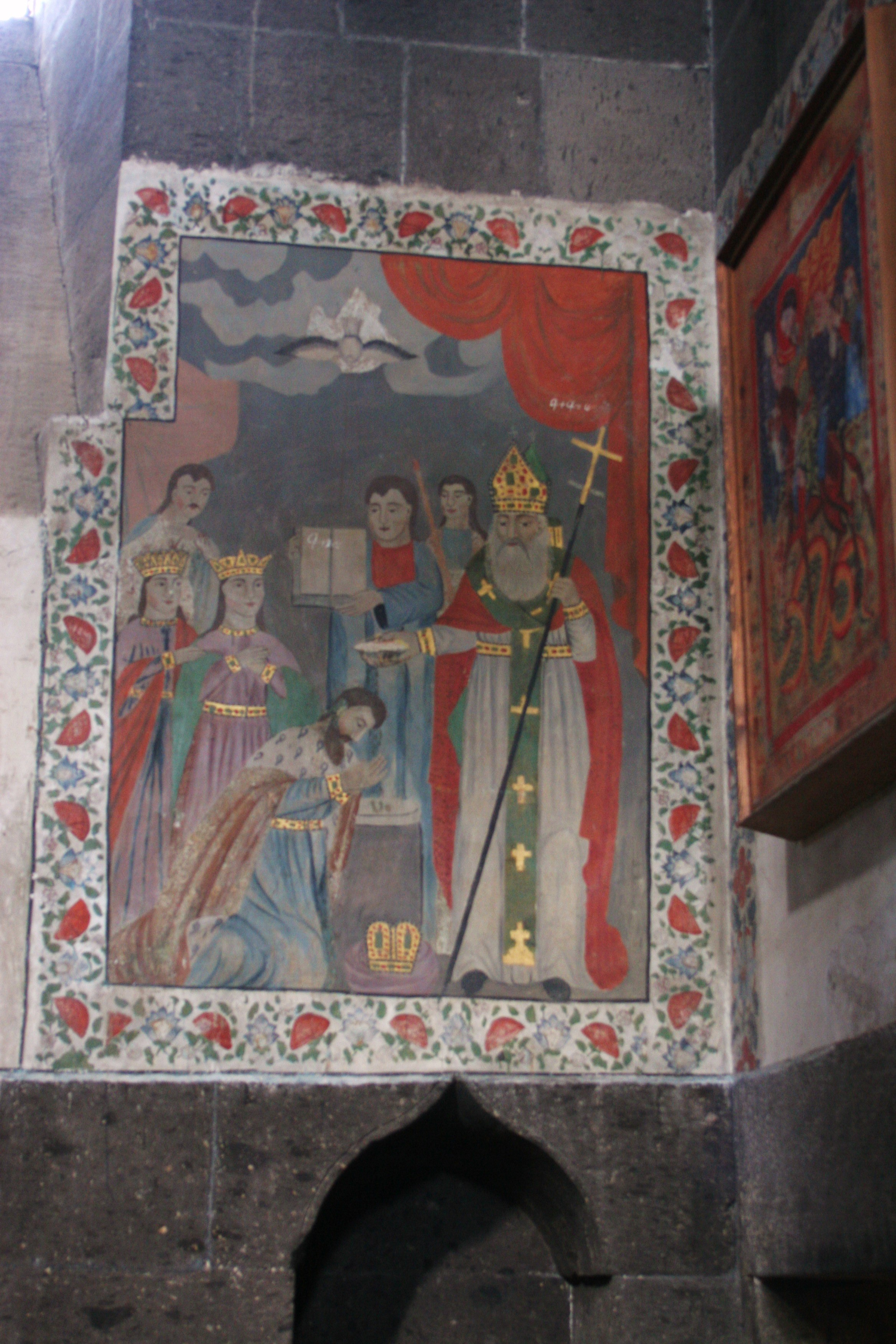
Interior frescoes

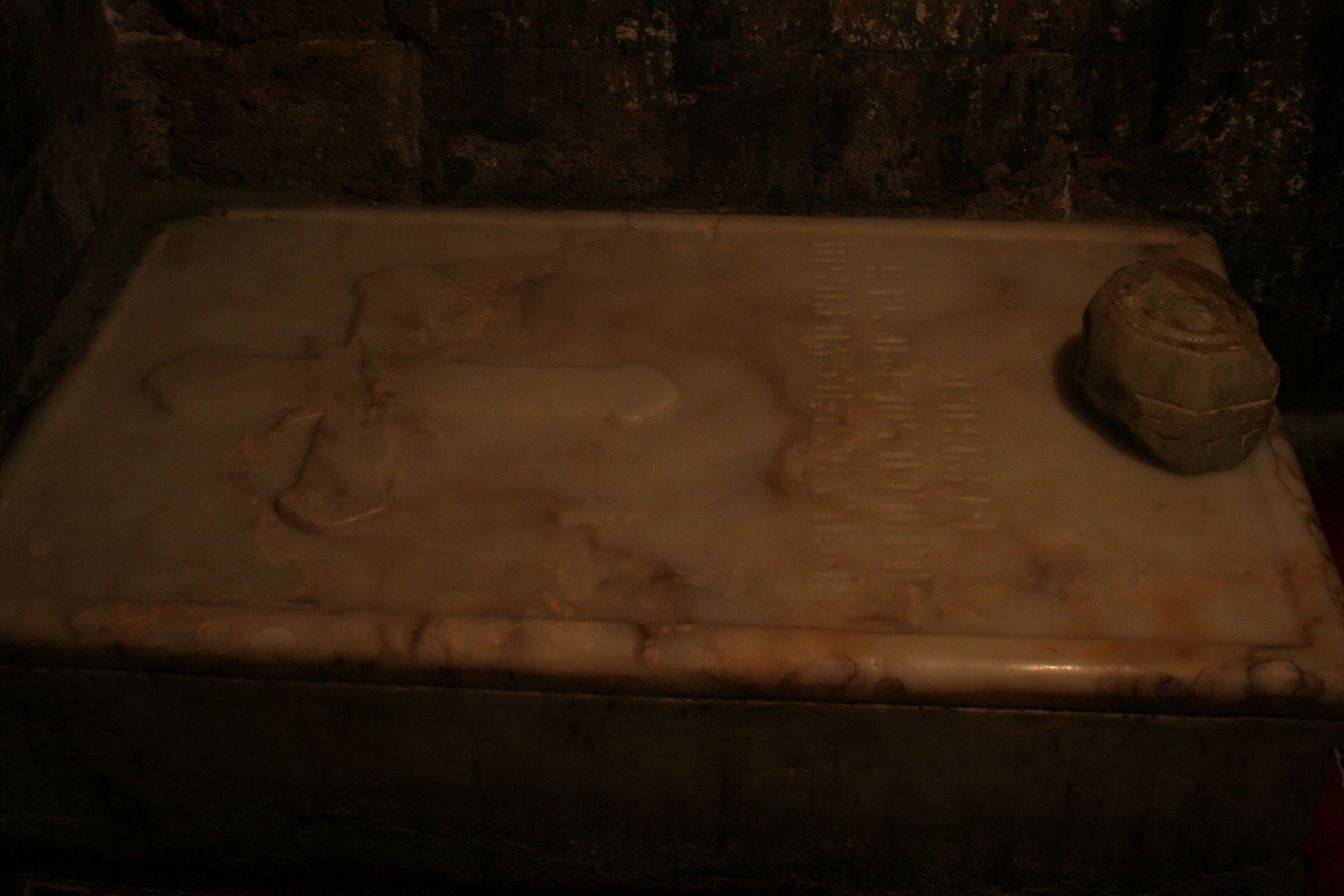
The tomb of Saint George within the church. The stone sitting on top is said to be from Jerusalem

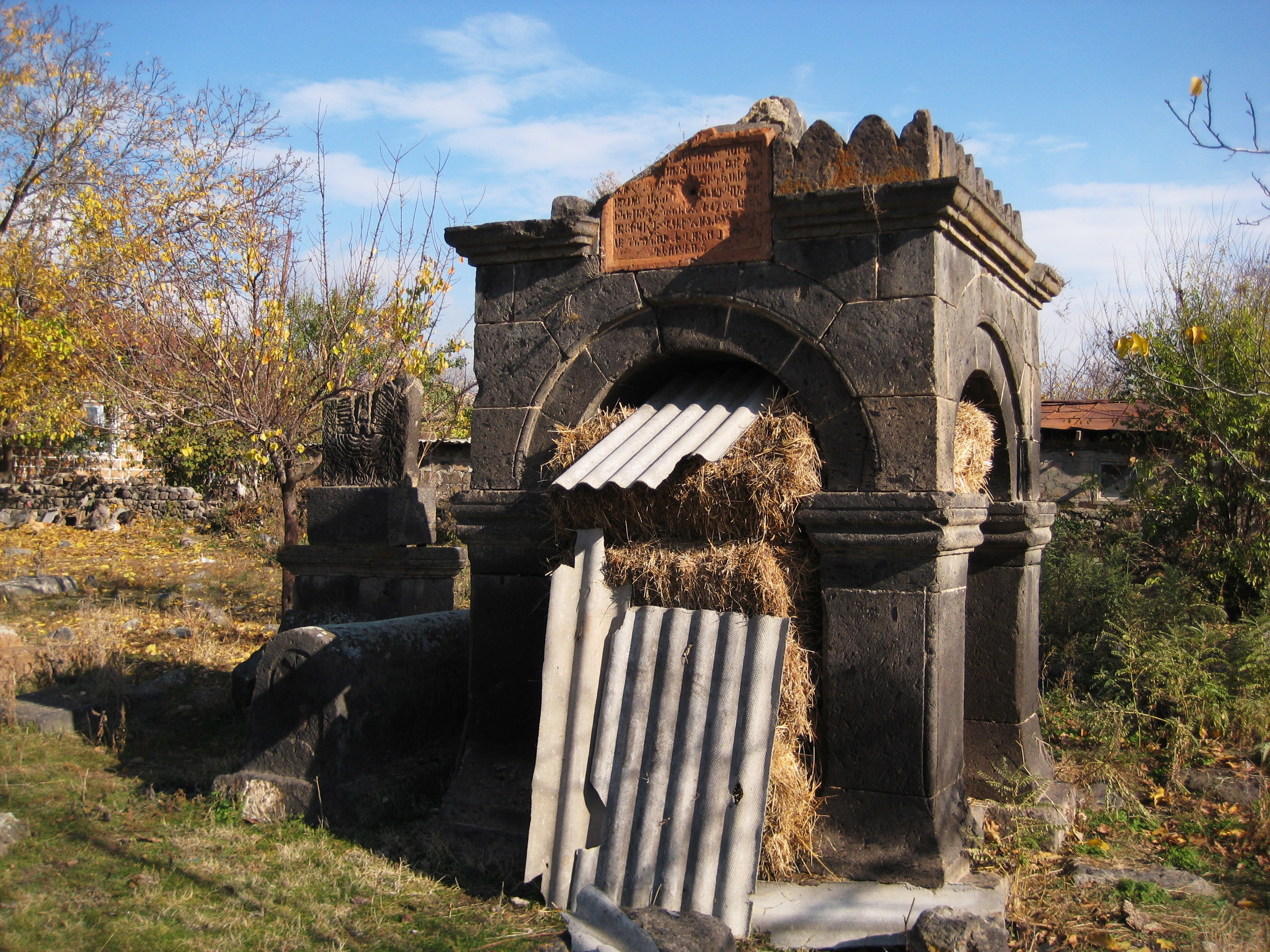
A tomb/monument at a cemetery directly across the street from Saint Gevork Monastery

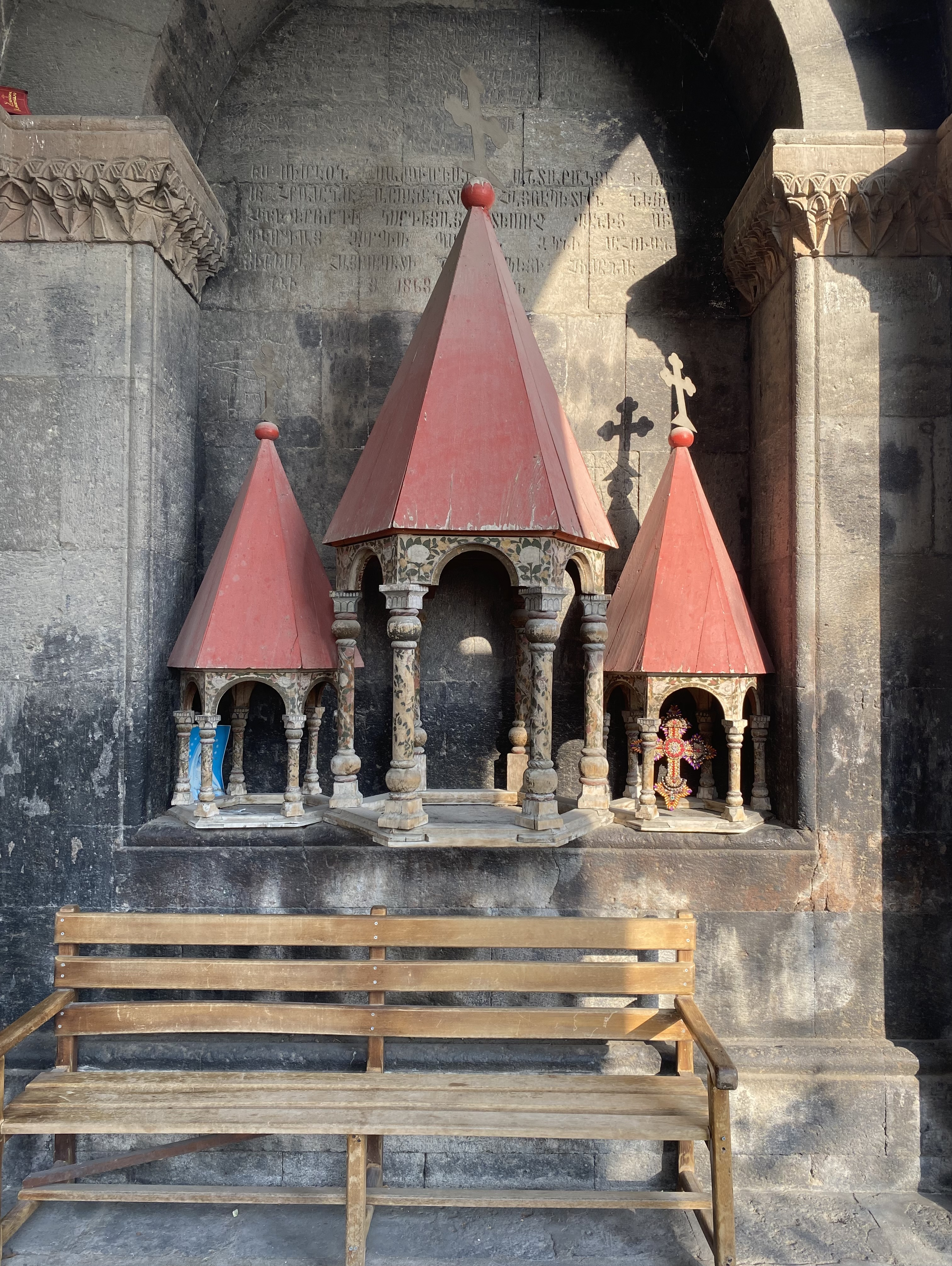
Wooden model of a church

== See also ==
- List of churches under the patronage of Saint George
