= Mughni =

Village in Aragatsotn, Armenia

Mughni Մուղնի
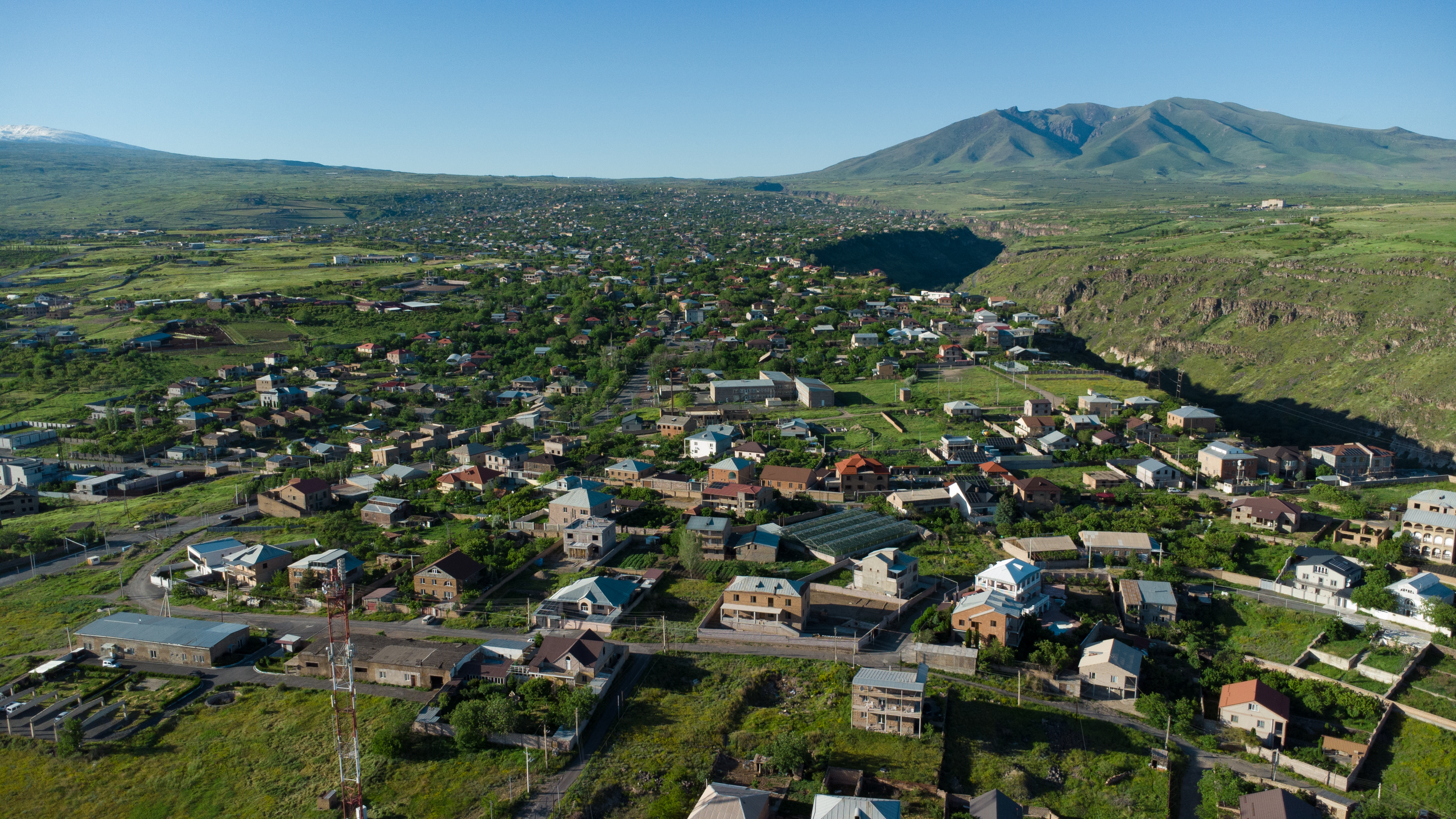
- Mughni

- Location within Armenia Location within Aragatsotn
- Coordinates: 40°18′56″N 44°22′18″E
- Country: Armenia
- Province: Aragatsotn
- Municipality: Ashtarak

Population (2011)
  - Total: 781
- Time zone: UTC+4
  - Summer (DST): UTC+5

Mughni (Armenian: Մուղնի) is a village situated in the Ashtarak Municipality of the Aragatsotn Province in Armenia. It is located just to the north of Ashtarak town and falls under its municipality. Prior to the Russian conquest, it held the distinction of being the southernmost town in the Aparan district. Mughni is renowned for housing the 14th-century Saint Gevork Monastery, which was once a prominent pilgrimage site and the residence of an archbishop. The dome of the church was reconstructed in the 1660s.

== Gallery ==
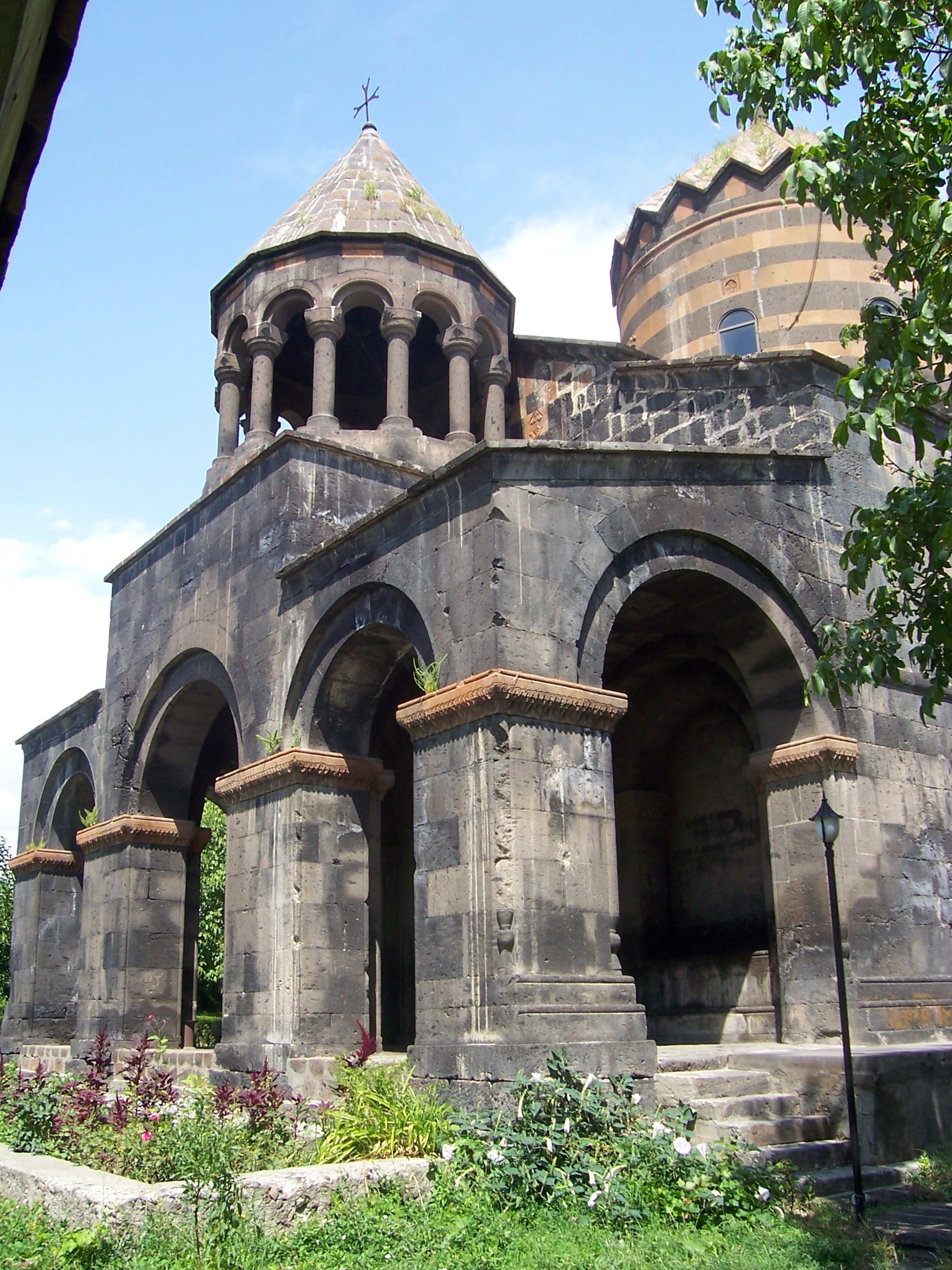
Saint Gevork Monastery of Mughni, 13th century

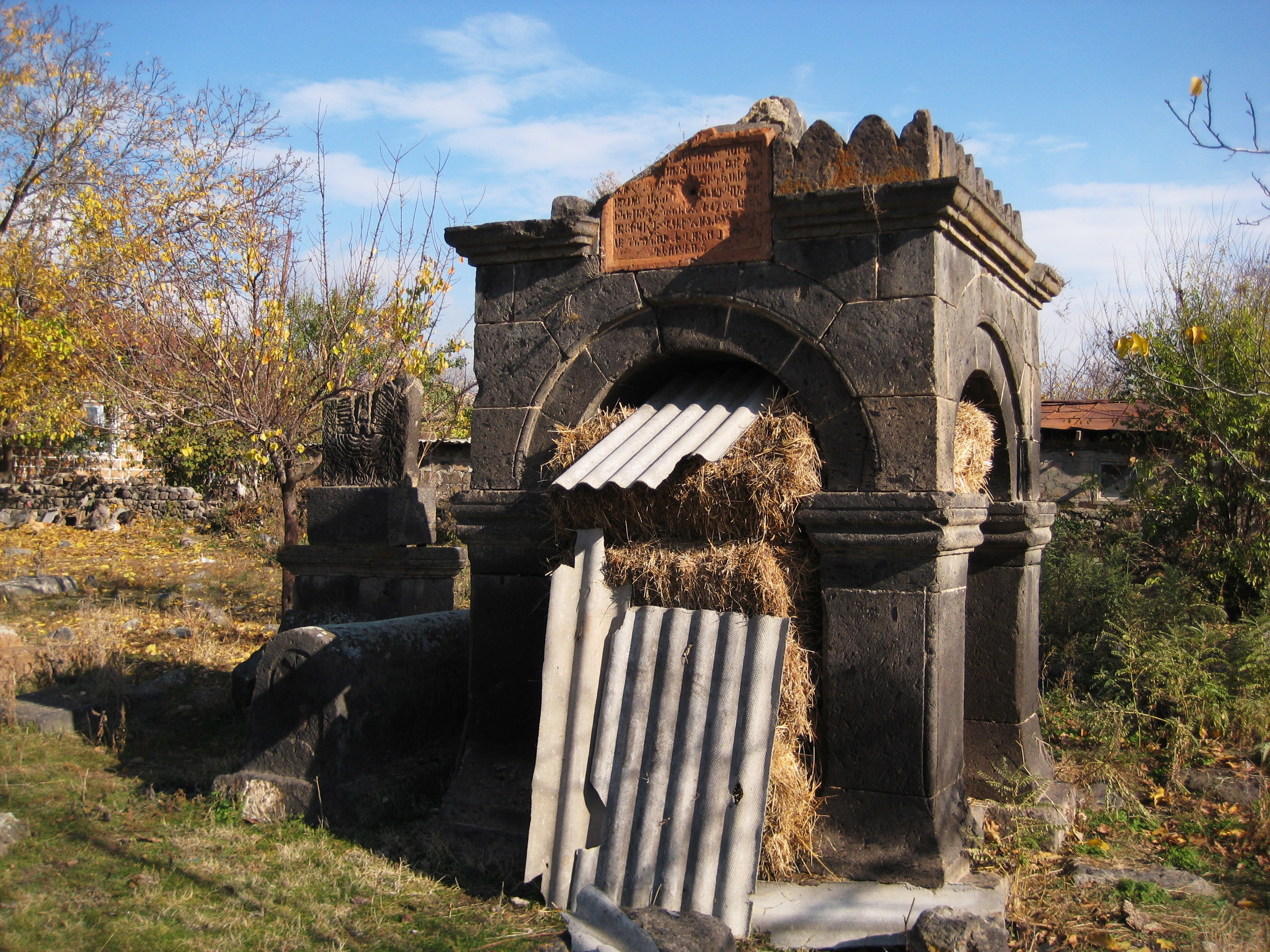
A tomb-monument at a cemetery directly across the street from Saint Gevork Monastery

== See also ==
- Saint Gevork Monastery of Mughni
