= Shenik =

Shenik may refer to:

- Shenik, Aragatsotn, Armenia
- Shenik, Armavir, Armenia
