= Shenik, Aragatsotn =

Shenik Շենիկ
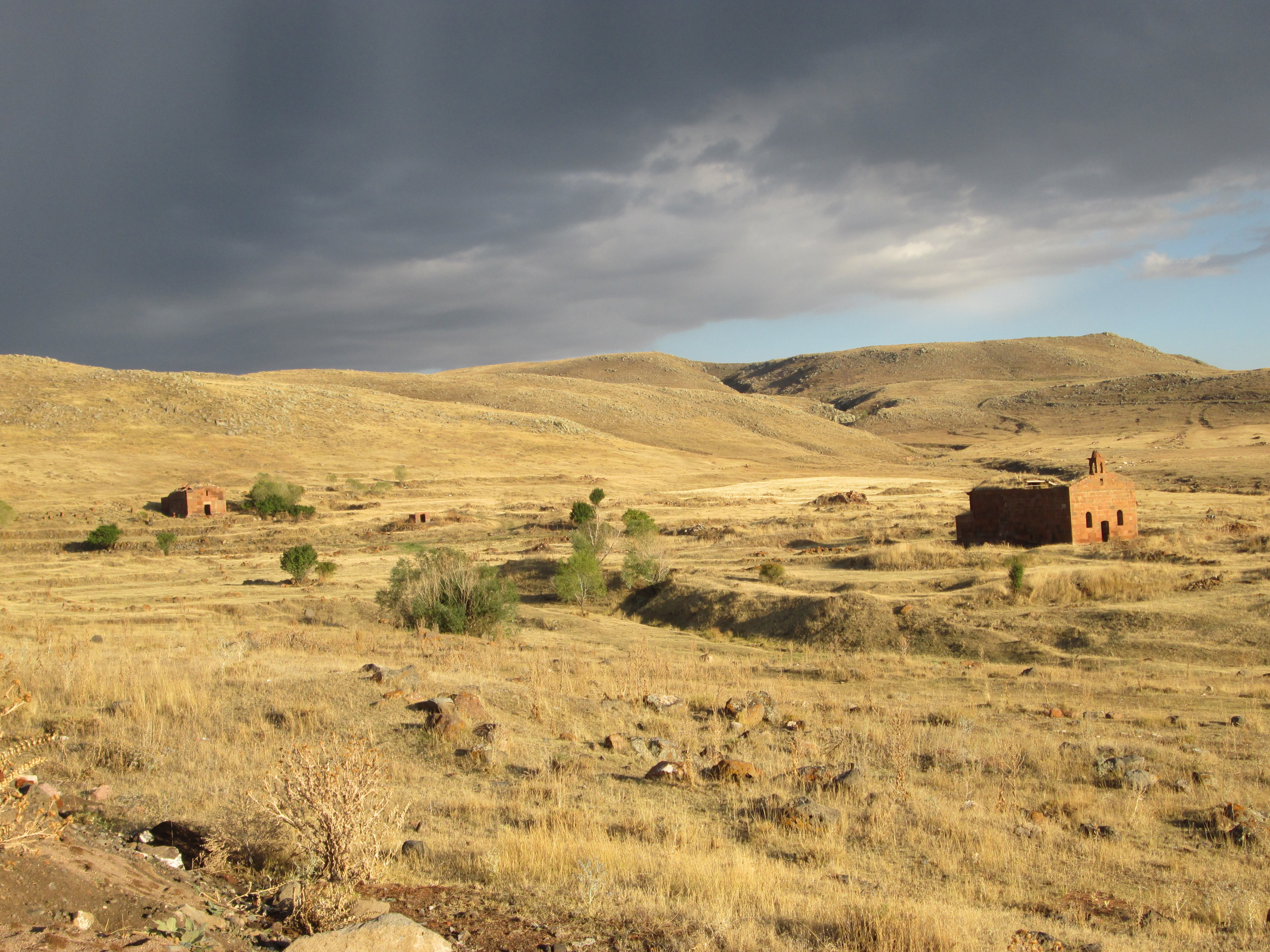
- Former settlement of Shenik

- Location within Armenia
- Coordinates: 40°26′40″N 43°56′00″E
- Country: Armenia
- Marz (Province): Aragatsotn
- Time zone: UTC+4 ( )

Shenik is a former settlement and an abandoned village in the Aragatsotn Province of Armenia. It is 3 km east of the Mastara village, and is home to the 5th-century church of Surp Amenaprkich (Holy Saviour), and the 7th-century church of Surp Astvatsatsin (Holy Mother of God).

== Gallery ==
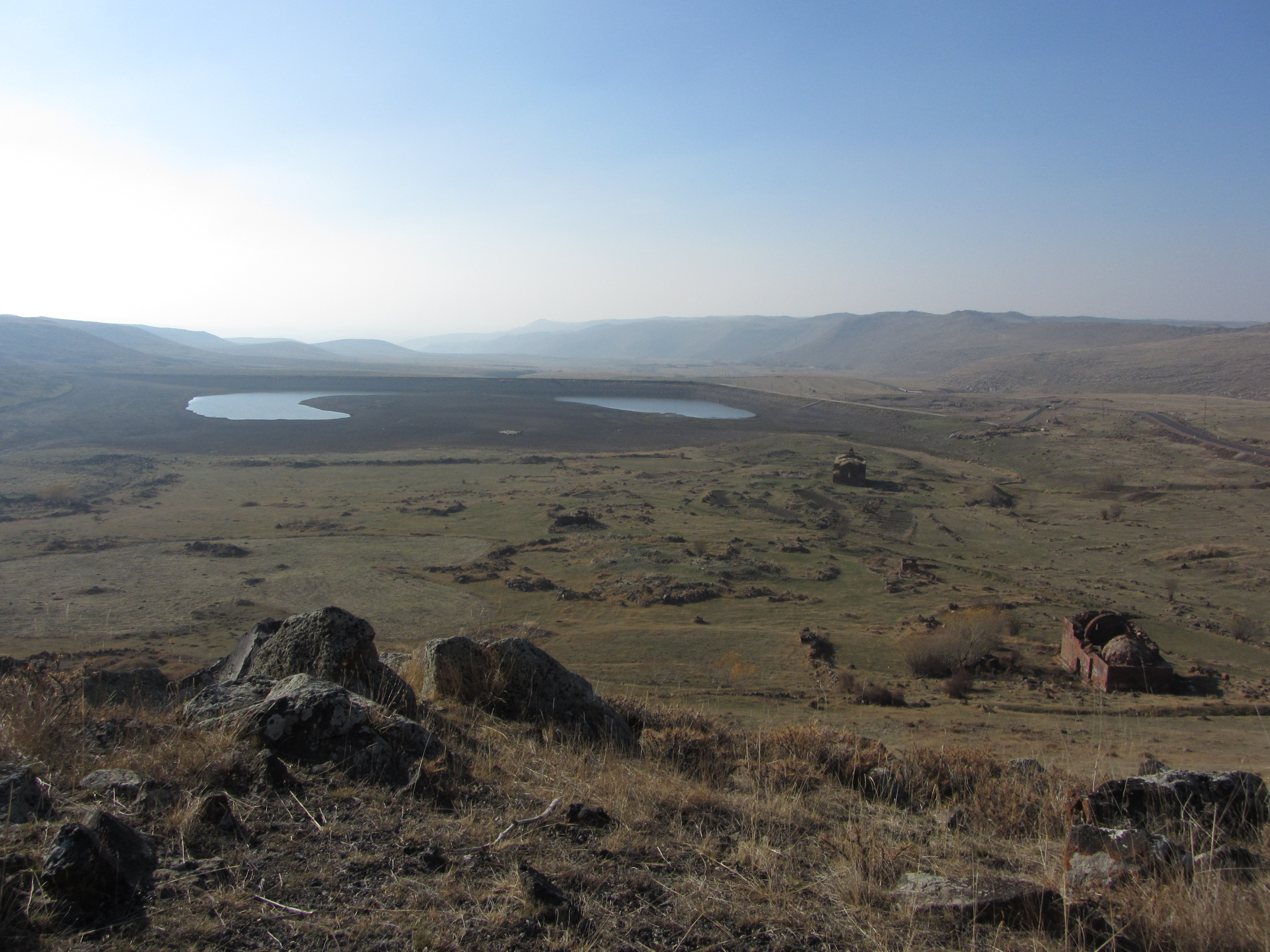
Settlement Shenik, general view

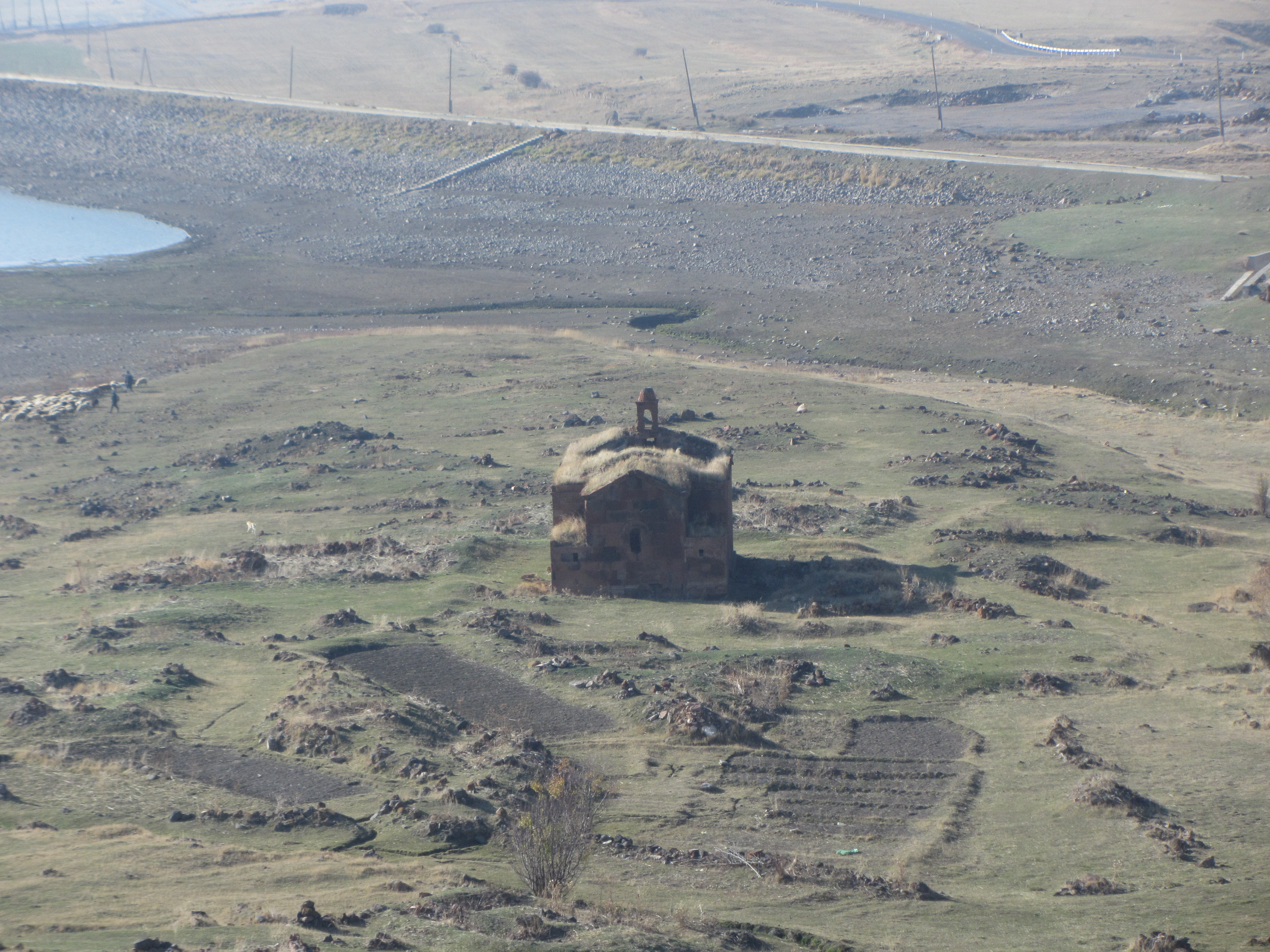
Settlement Shenik, Surb Astvatsatsin (Surb Sargis) Church

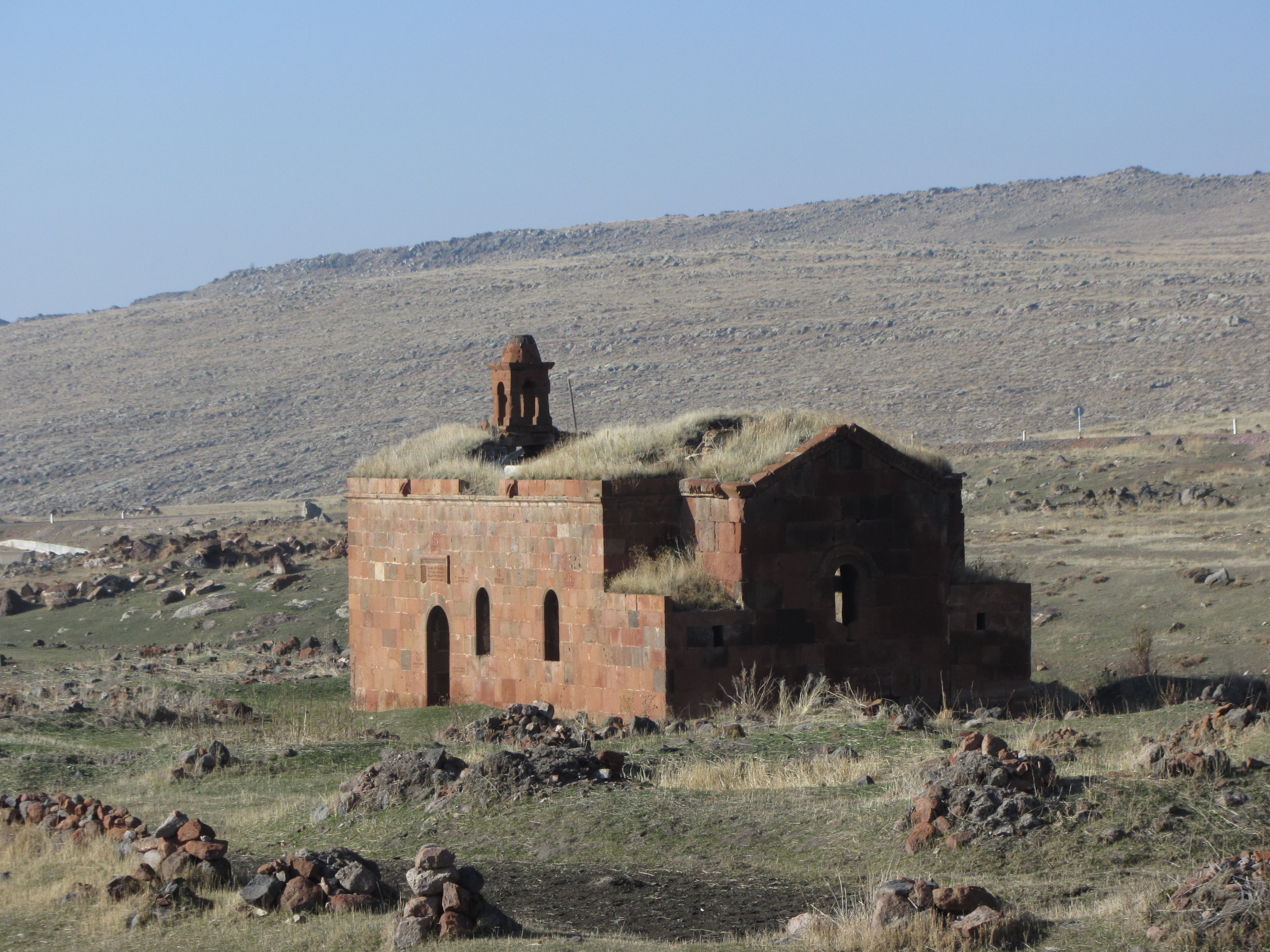
Surb Astvatsatsin (Surb Sargis) Church

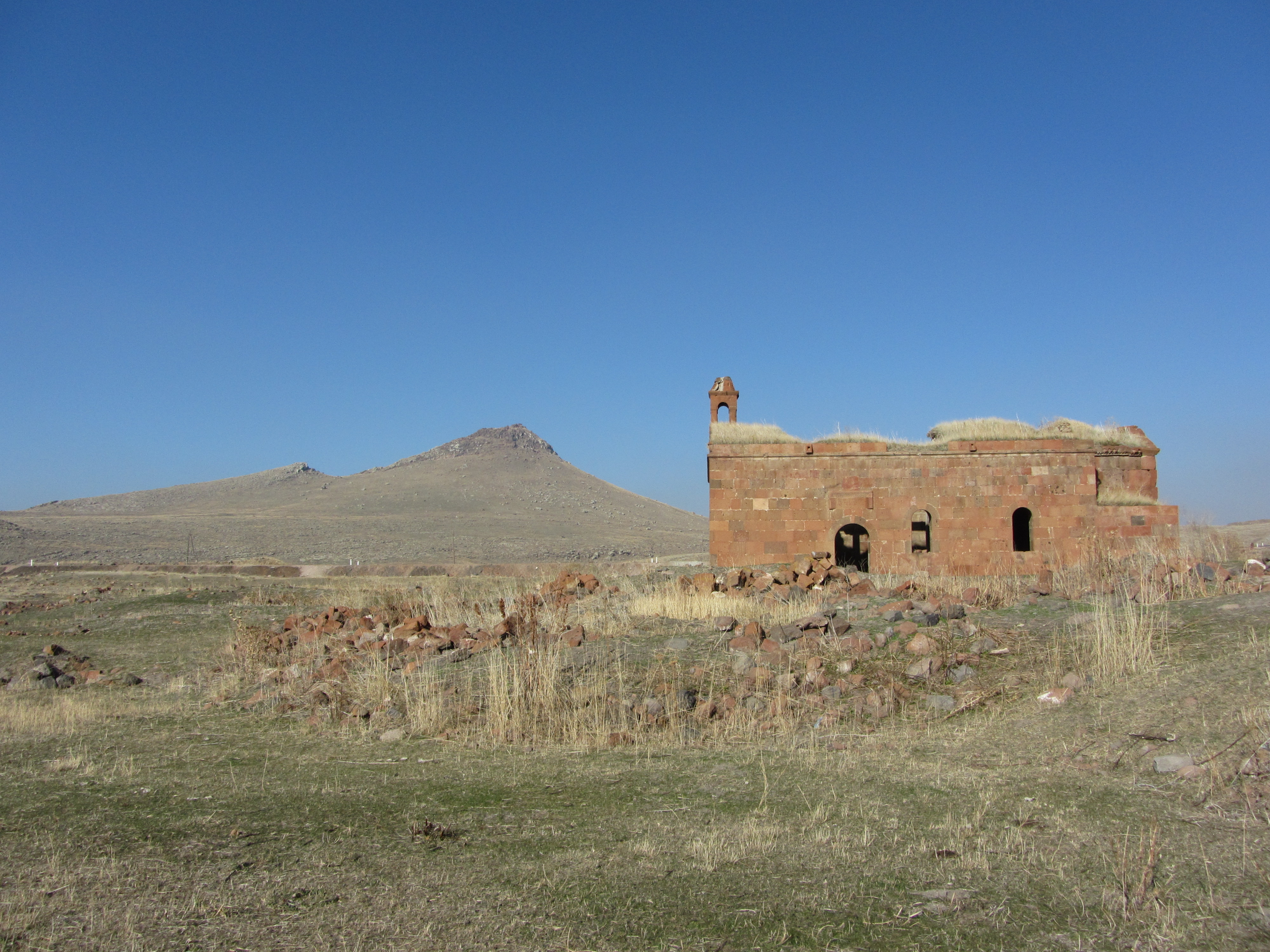
Surb Astvatsatsin (Surb Sargis) Church

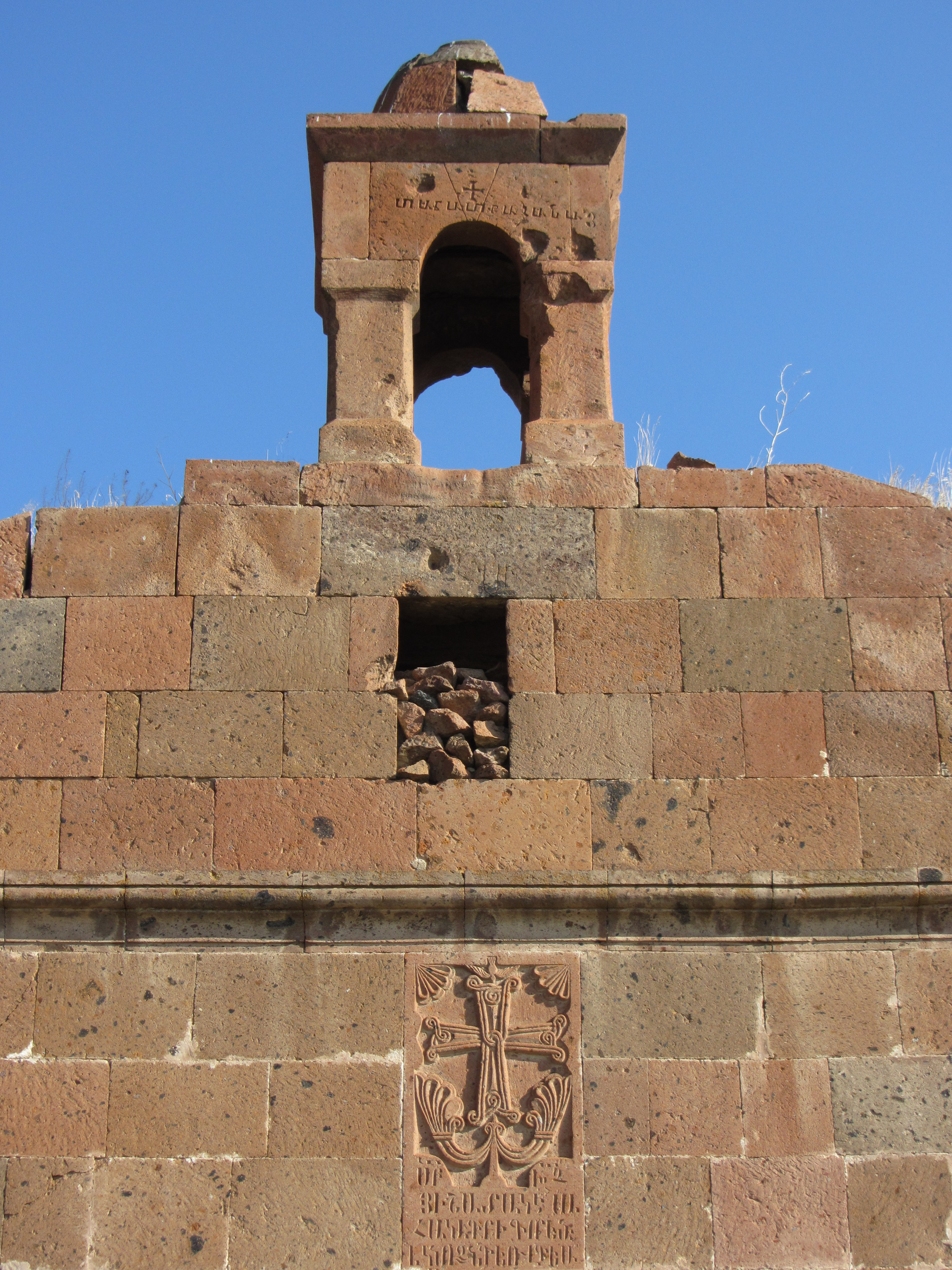
Surb Astvatsatsin (Surb Sargis) Church

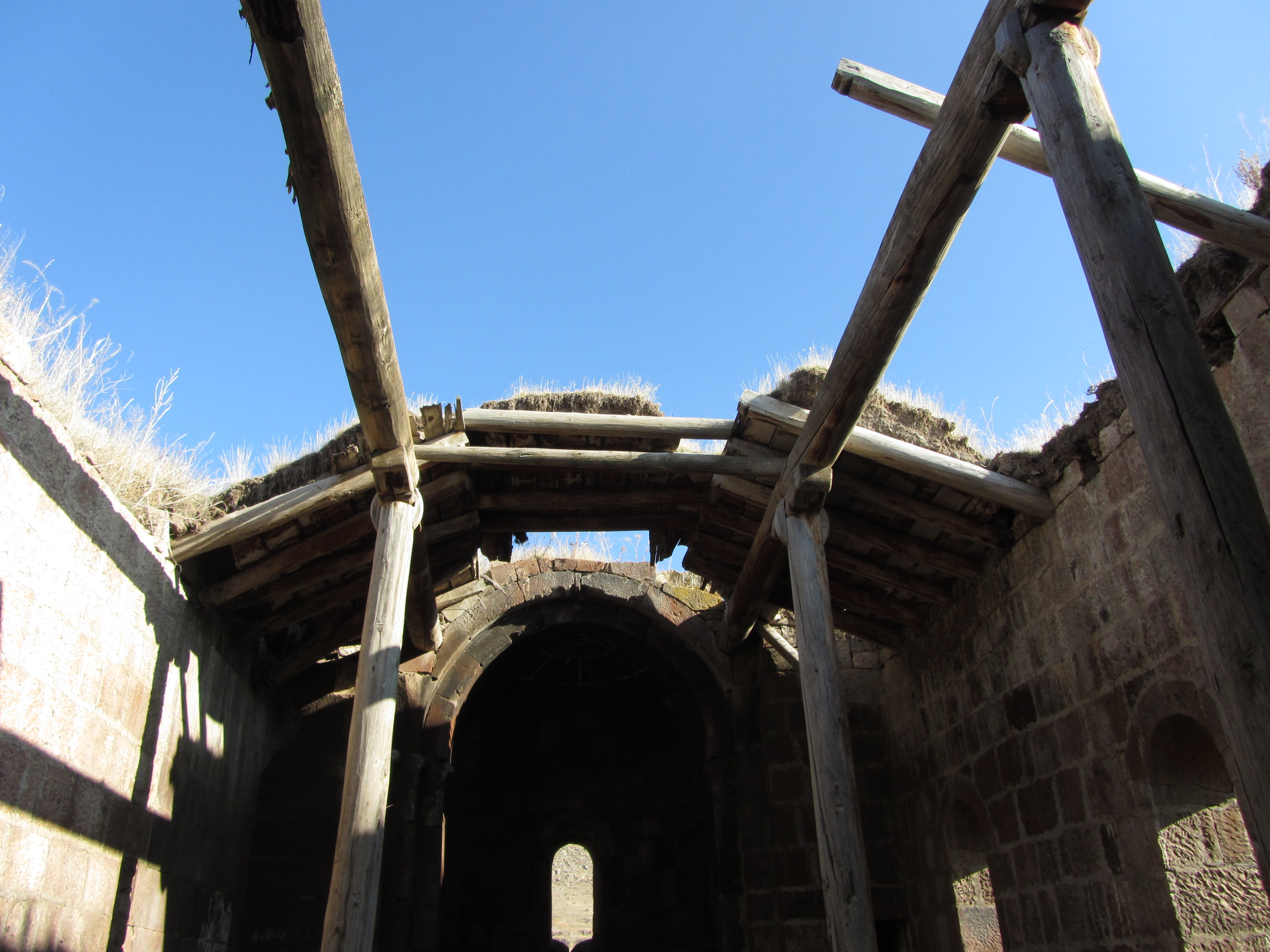
Surb Astvatsatsin (Surb Sargis) Church

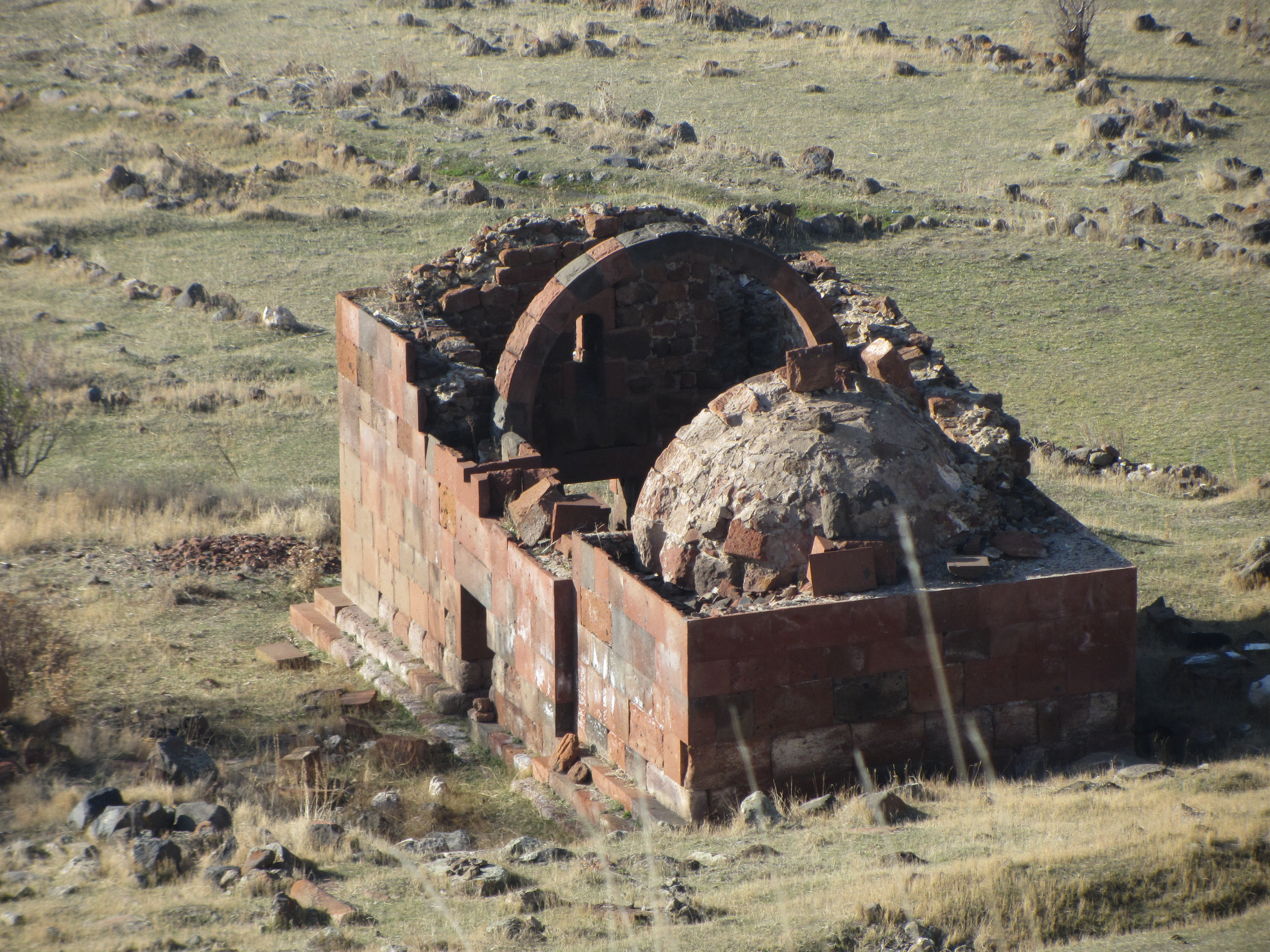
Settlement Shenik, Surb Amenaprkich Church

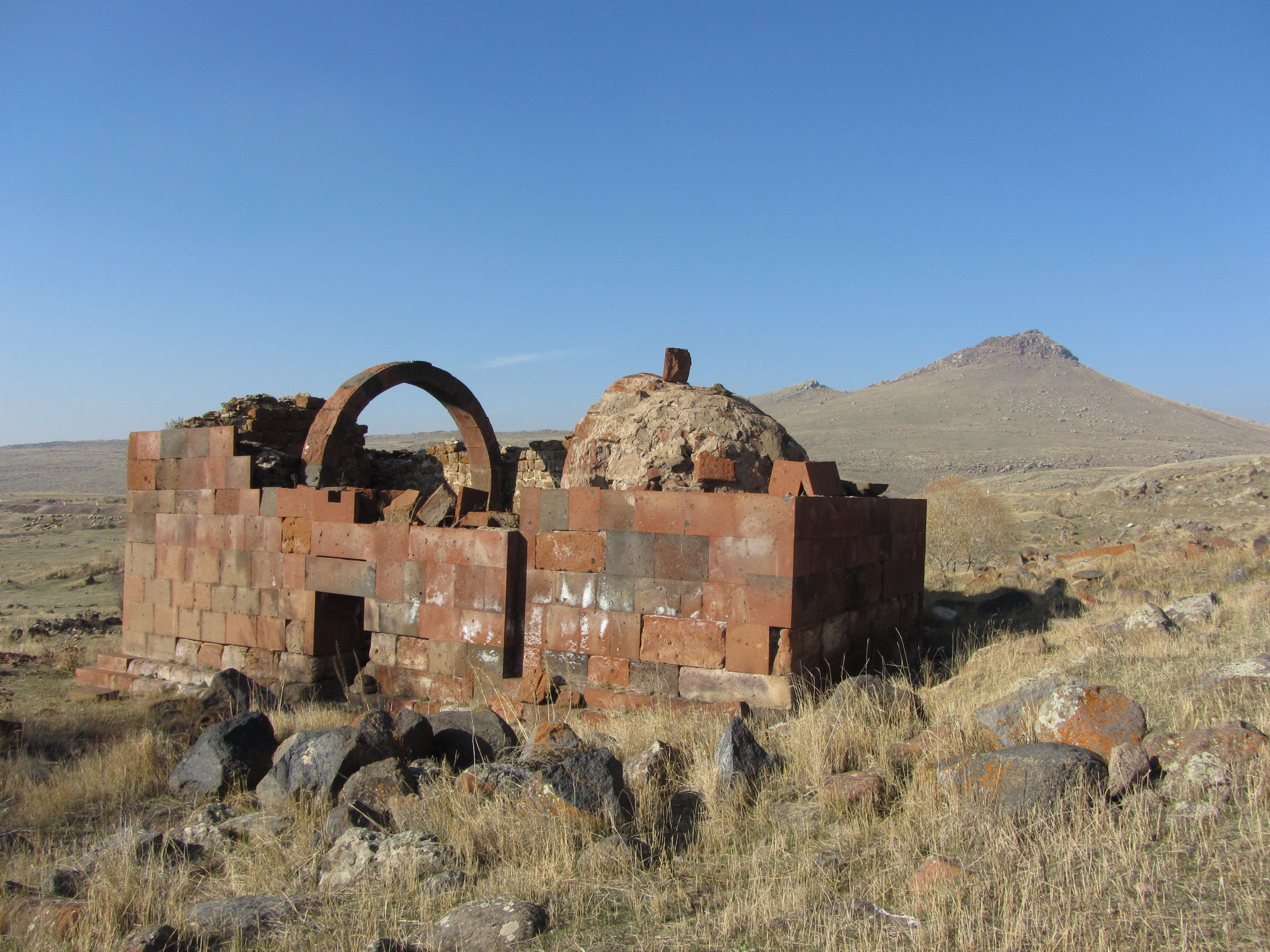
Surb Amenaprkich Church

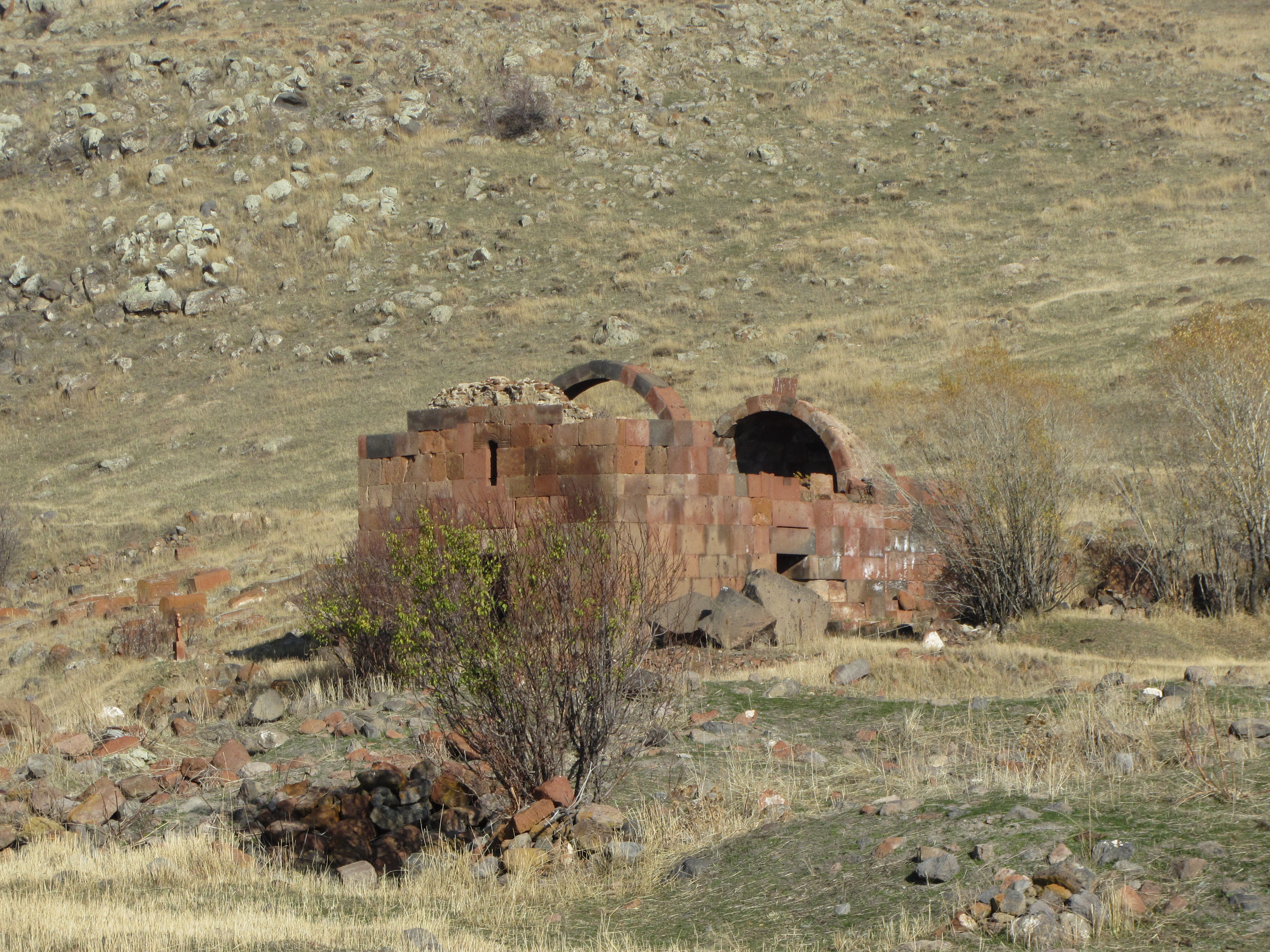
Surb Amenaprkich Church

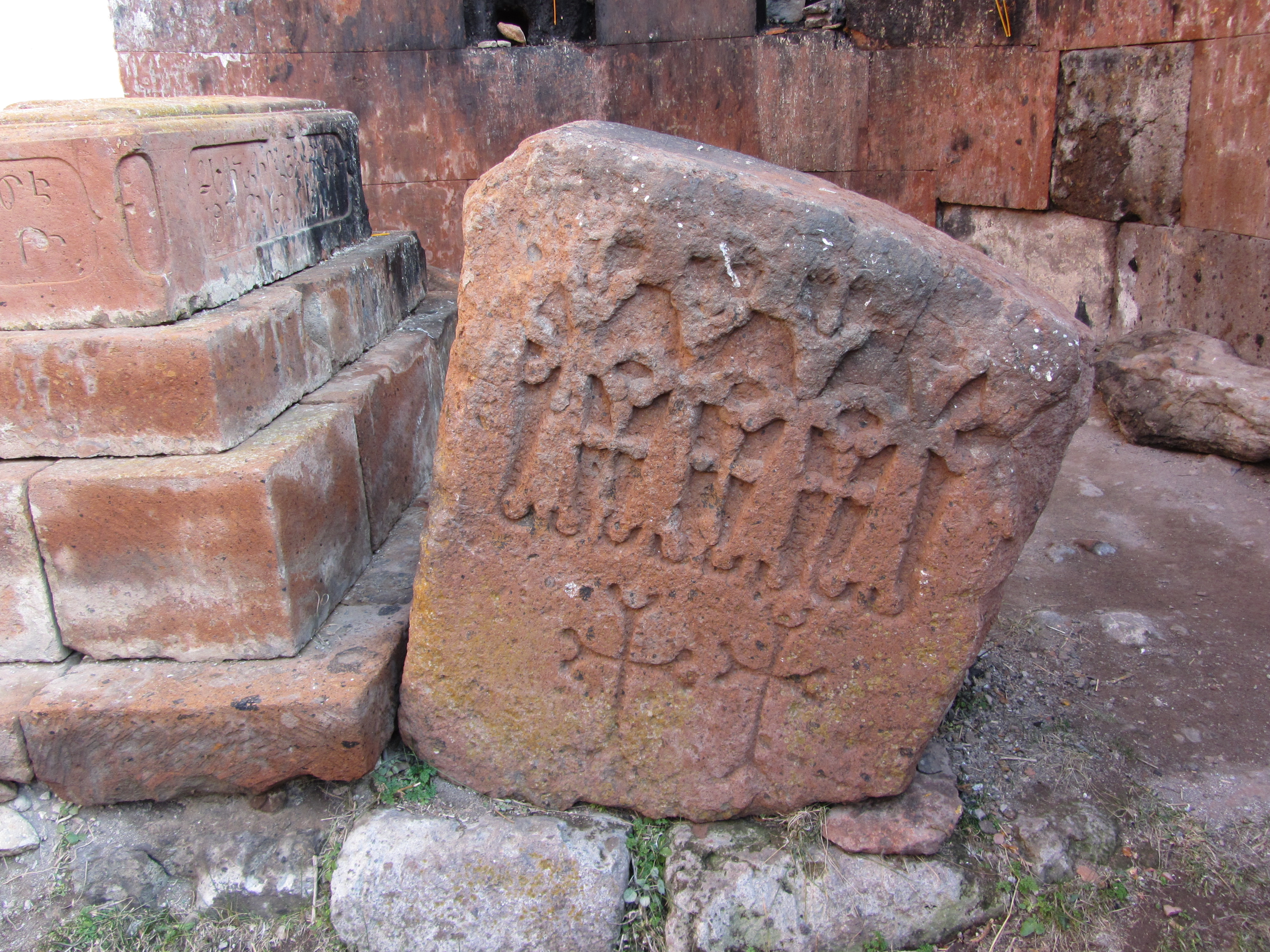
Surb Amenaprkich Church, tombstone

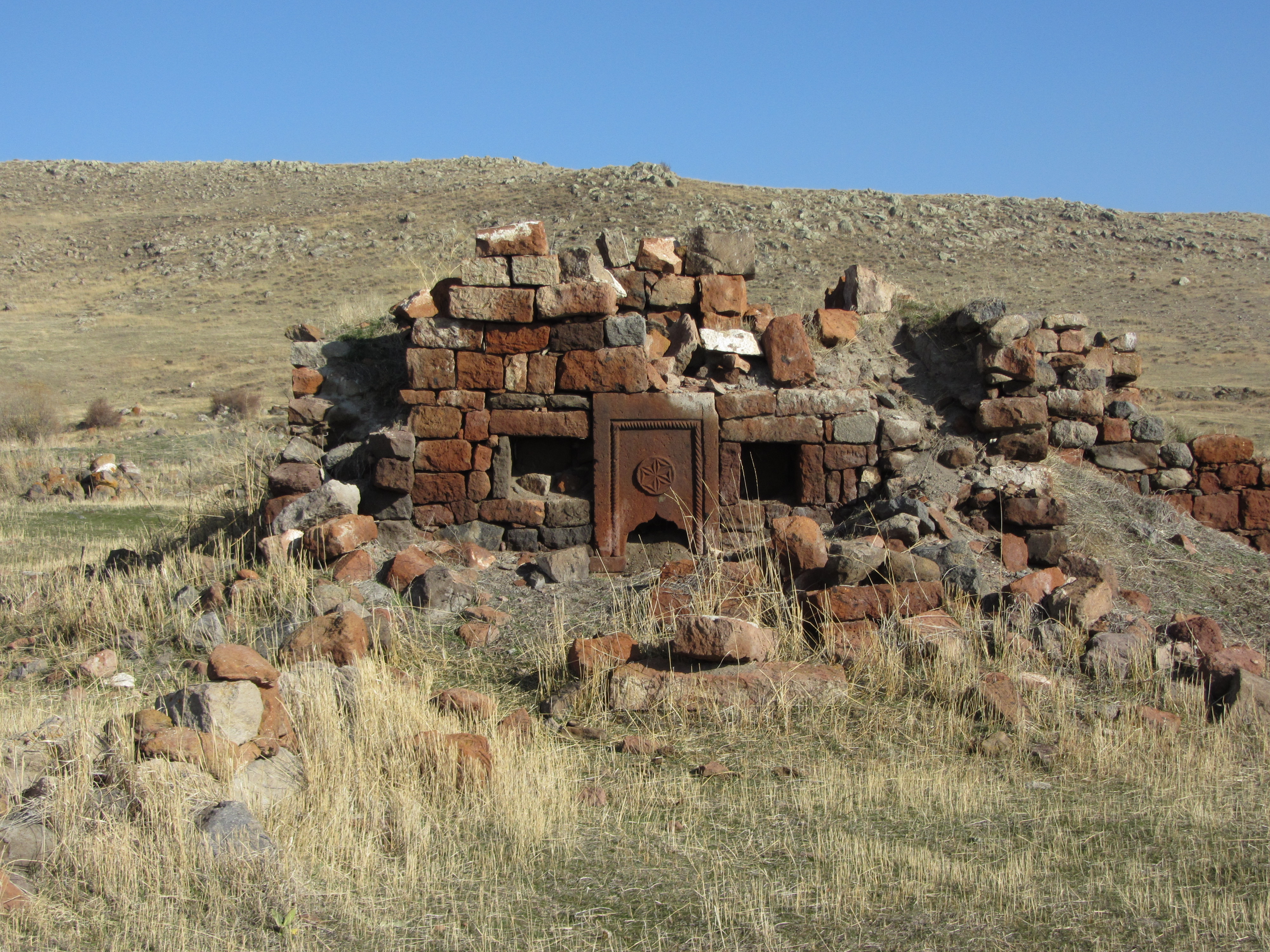
Settlement Shenik

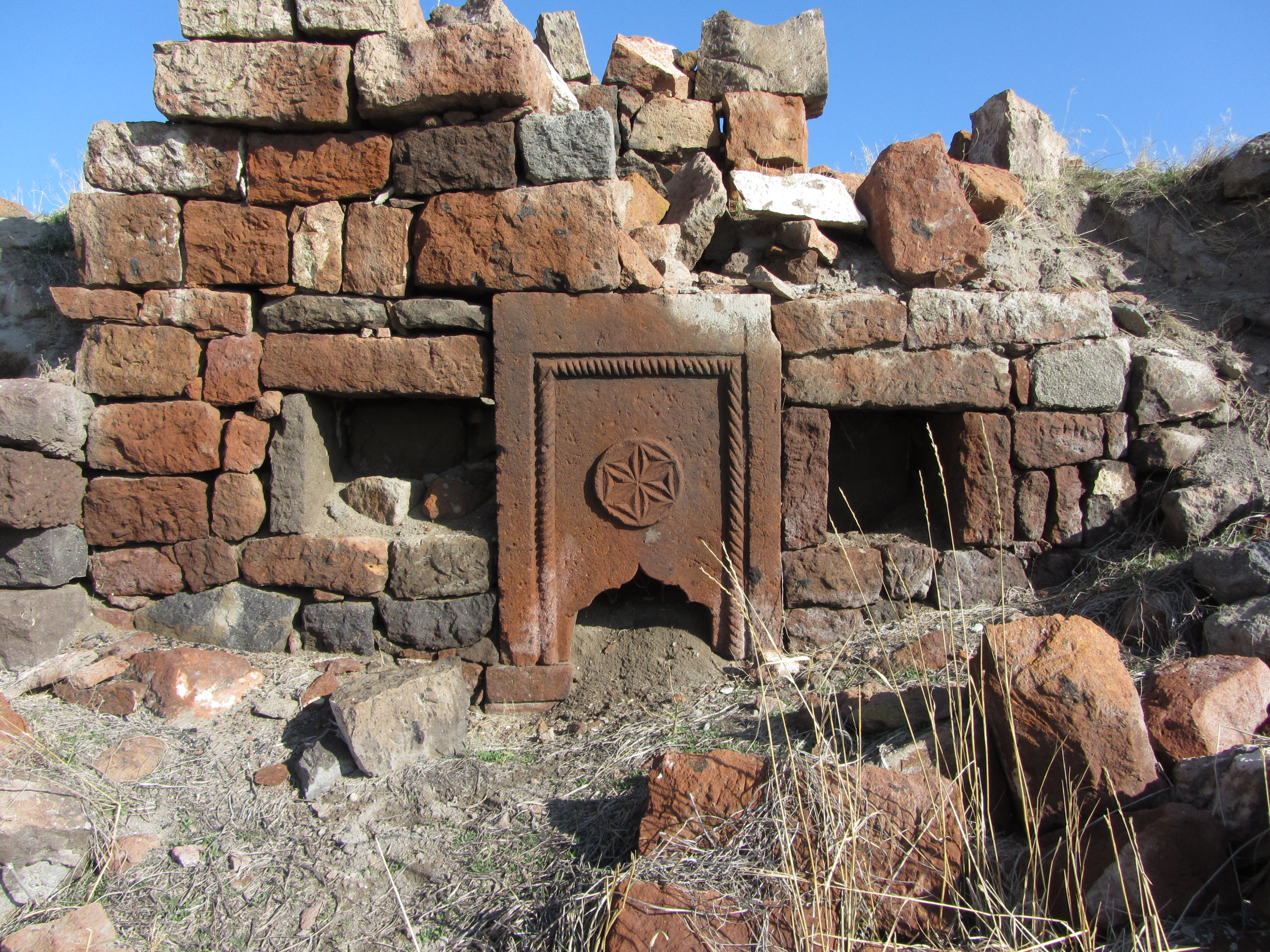
Settlement Shenik

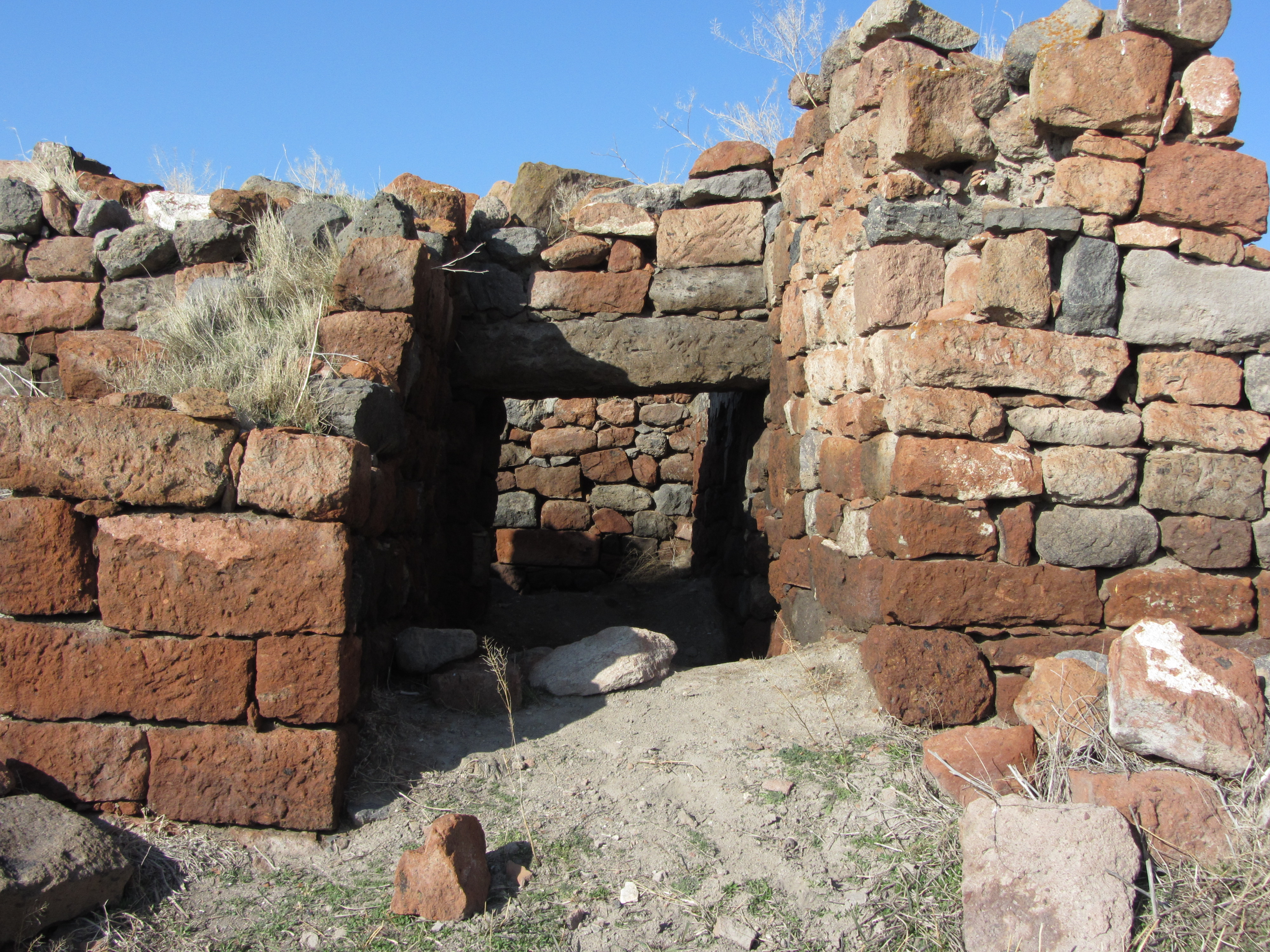
Settlement Shenik
