= Saint George's Church, Garnahovit =

Cultural heritage monument of Armenia

Saint George Church
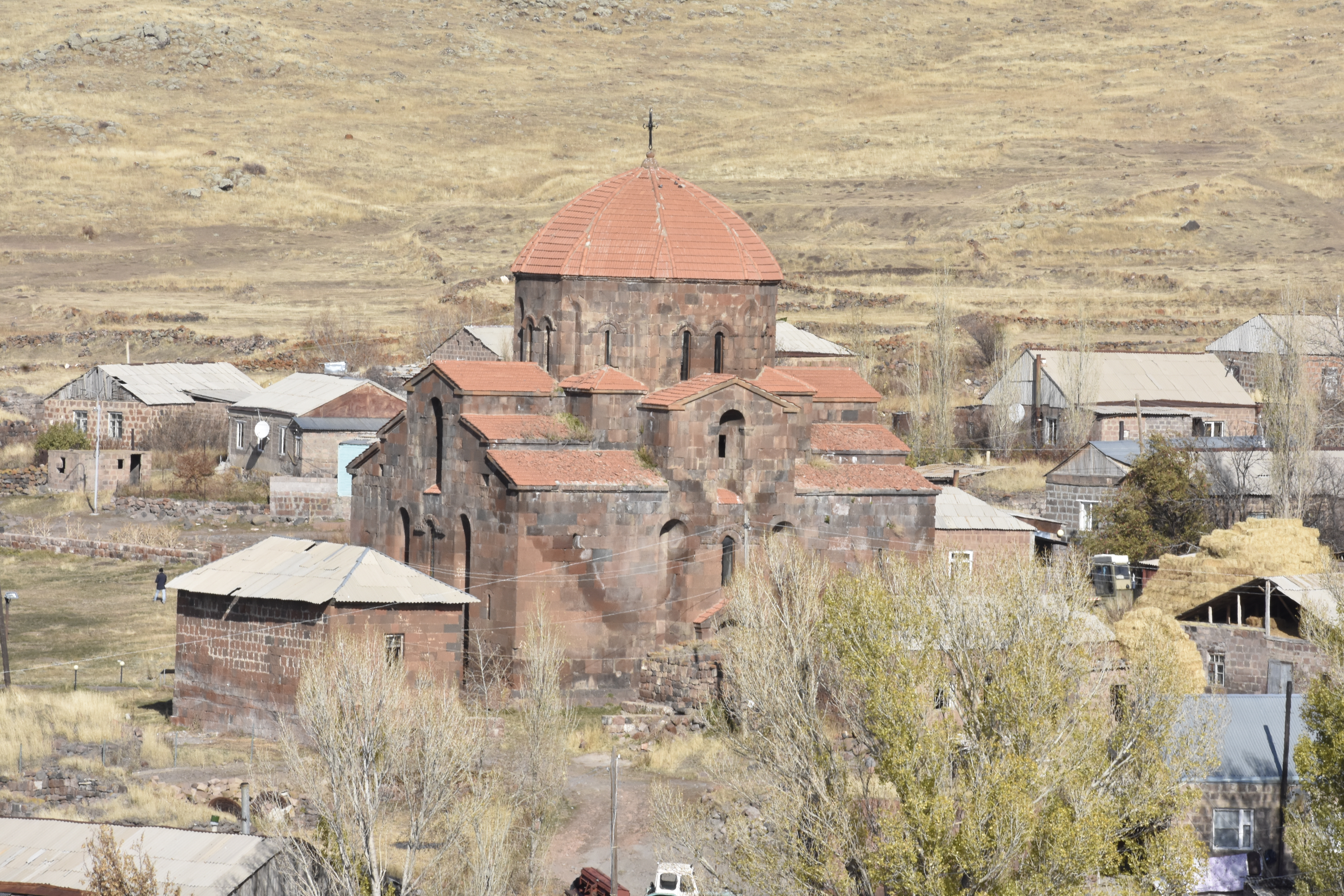
- The Church of St. Georg in the village of Garnahovit.

- Location within Armenia Location within Aragatsotn

Religion
- Affiliation: Armenian Apostolic Church
- Region: Caucasus

Location
- Location: Garnahovit, Aragatsotn Province, Armenia
- Coordinates: 40.496831°N 43.956134°E

Architecture
- Style: Armenian
- Completed: mid-7th century
- Dome: 1

The church of Saint George (Armenian: Սուրբ Գեւորգ Եկեղեցի; pronounced Surp Gevork) is located centrally in the village of Garnahovit, Aragatsotn Province, Armenia. Its imposing architecture dominates the surrounding village and landscape.

== Architecture ==
St. Gevorg has a single large Byzantine-style red tile, octagonal umbrella dome that is centered over the church. The style of domed roof is uncommon in Armenia, especially on larger structures. The dome sits above an octagonal drum that is pierced by twelve small windows; pairs of windows on each of the four sides, and single windows on the other four sides. The church was renovated at least once.

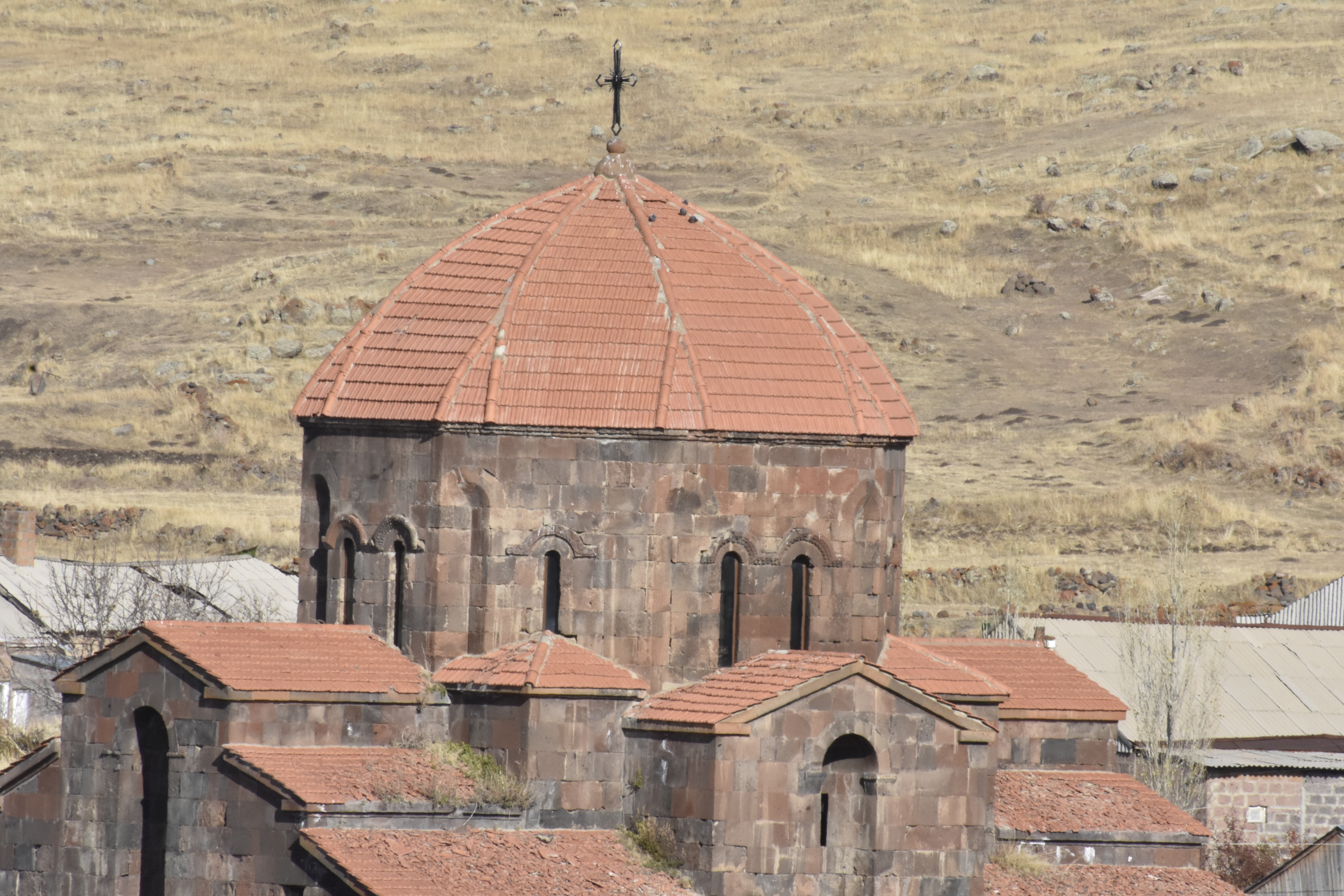

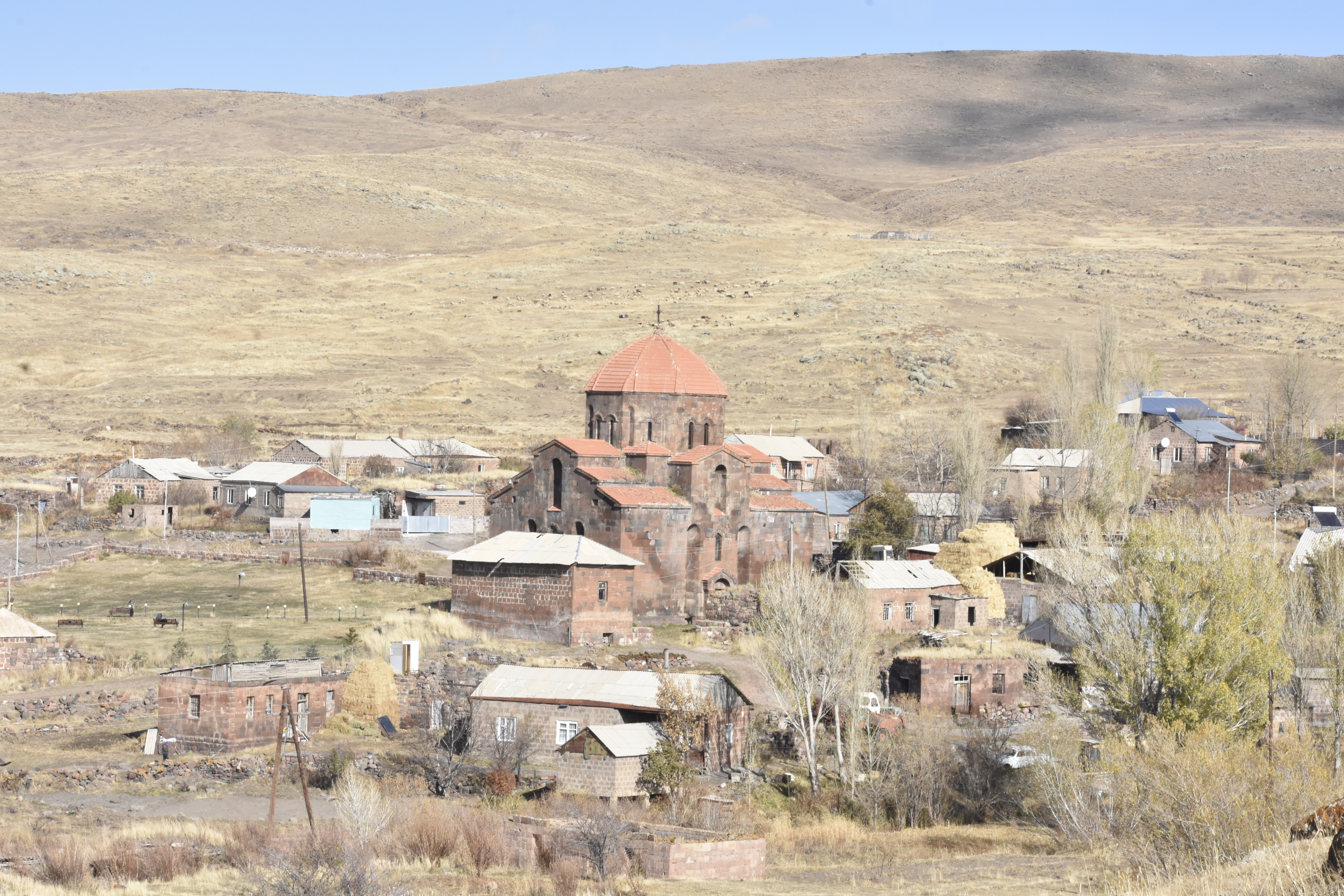

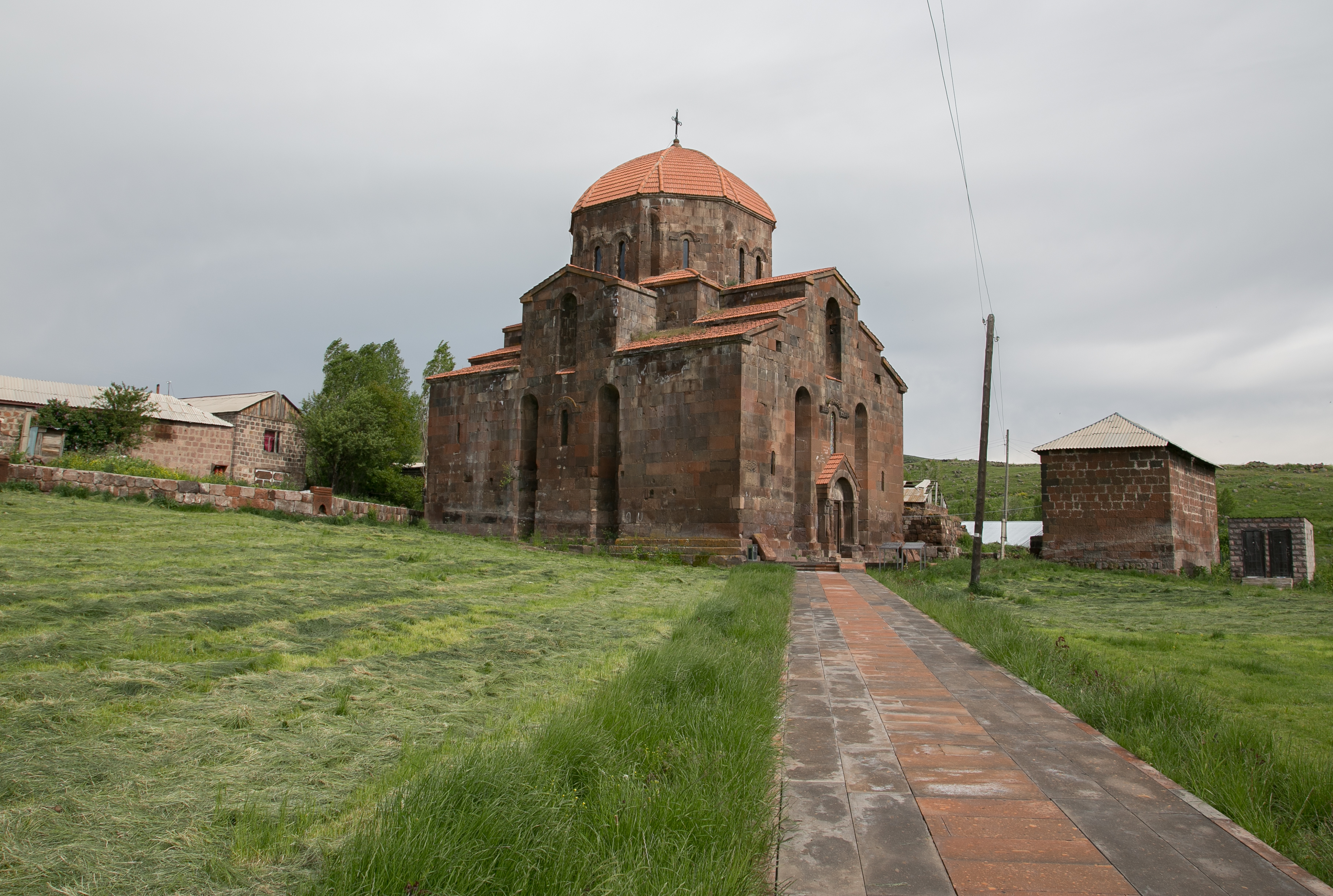

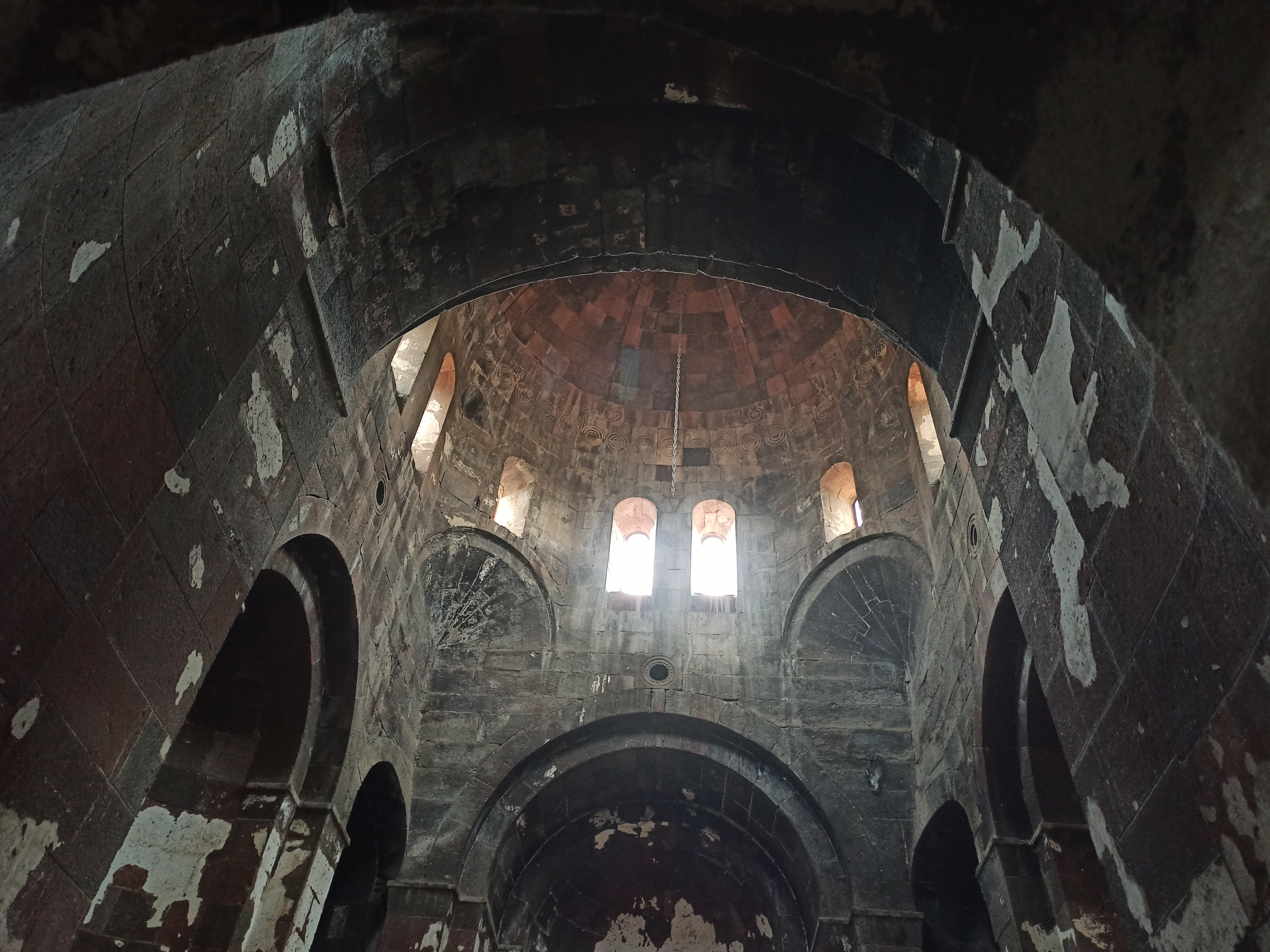

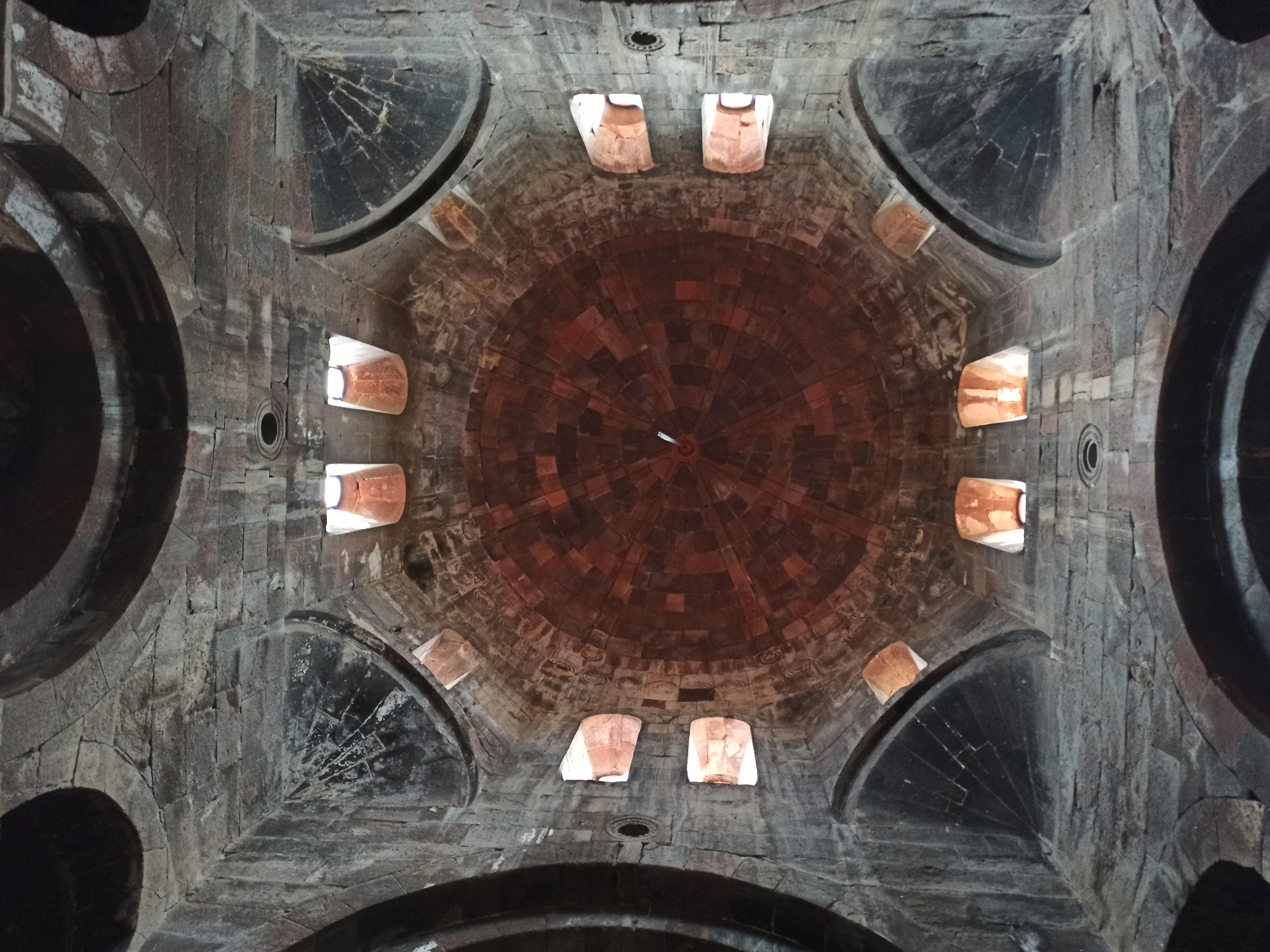

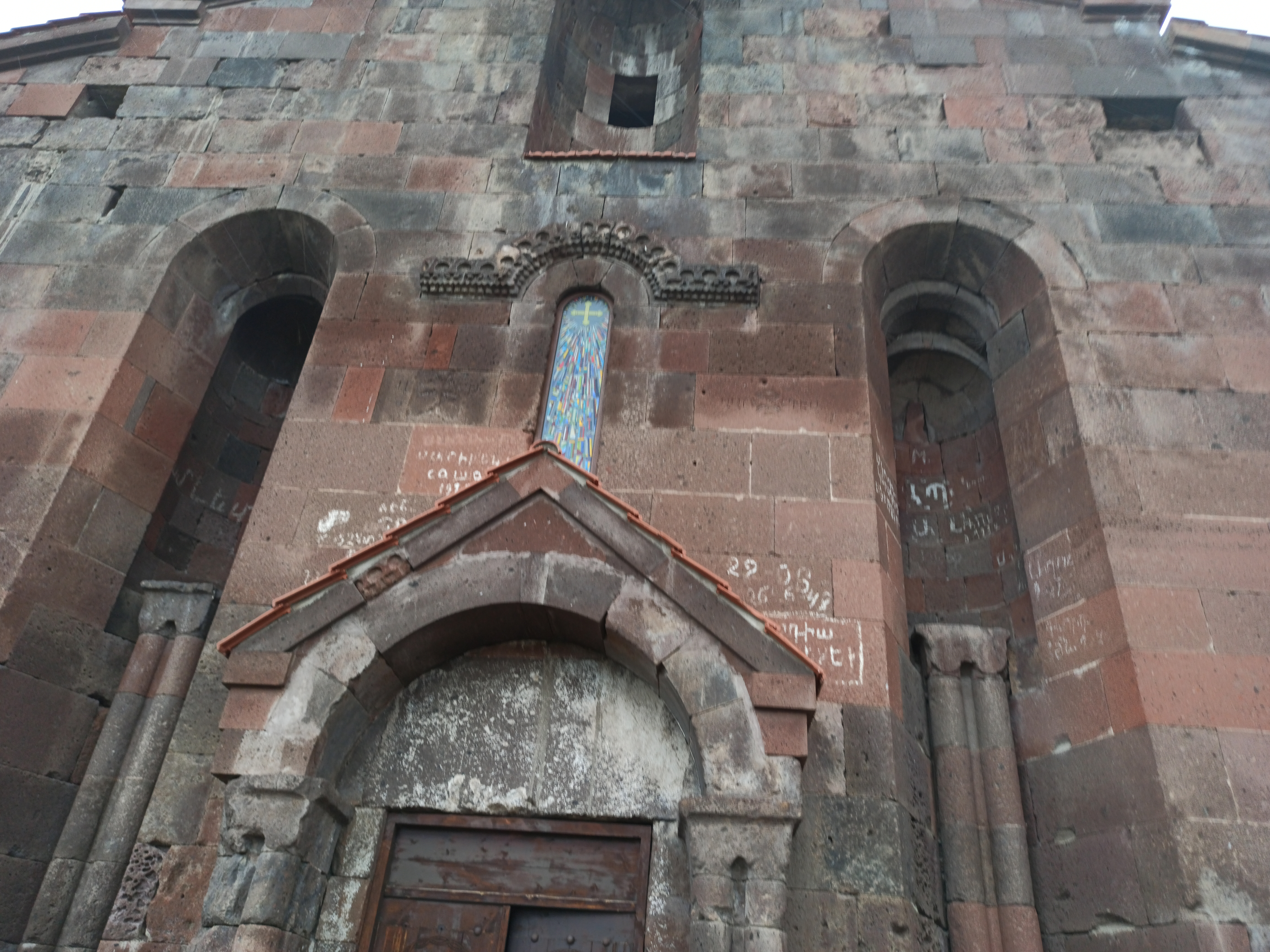
