= Garnahovit =

Garnahovit Գառնահովիտ
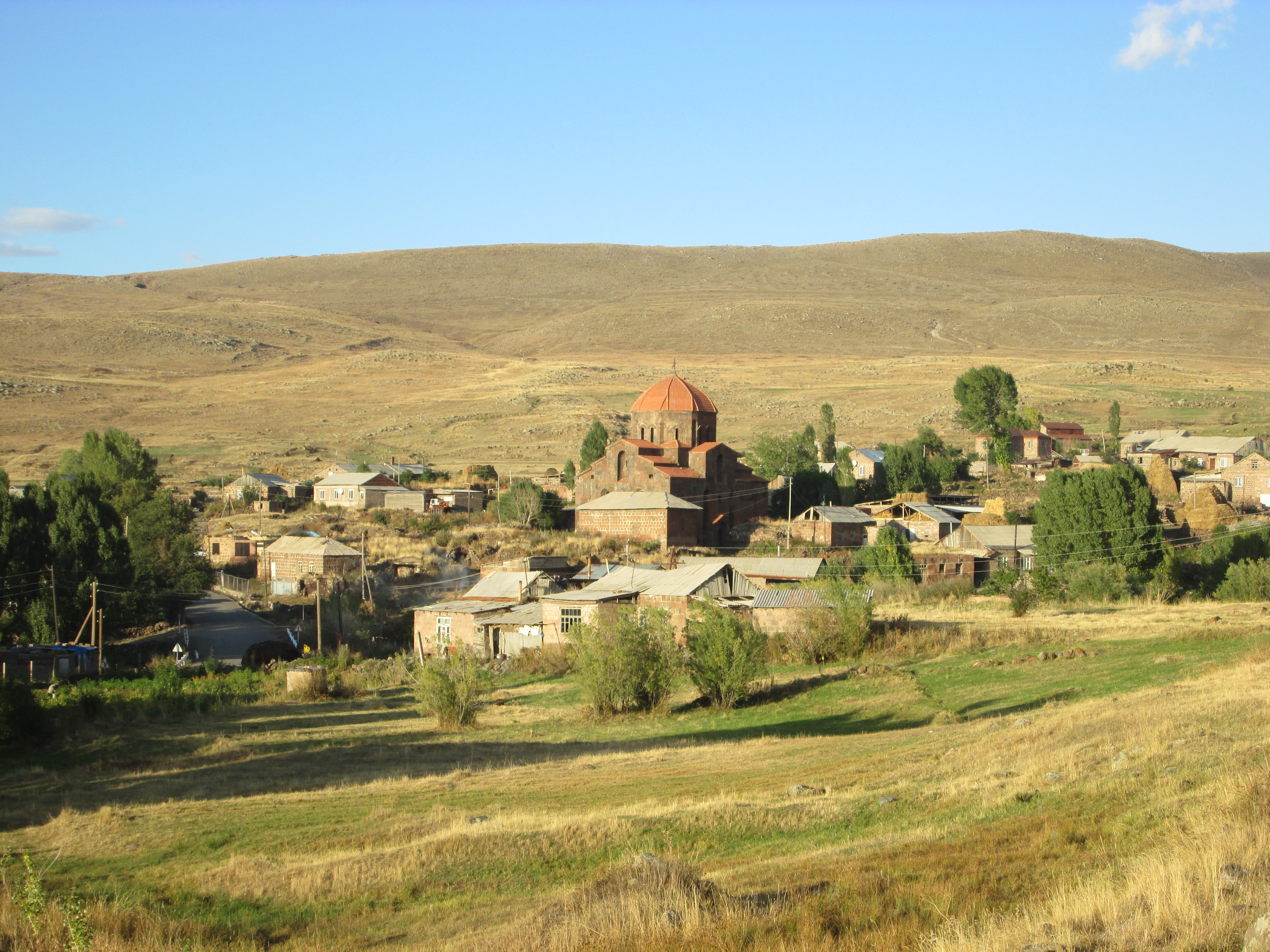
- The village of Garnahovit with the imposing Church of S. Gevorg (center).

- Location within Armenia Location within Aragatsotn
- Coordinates: 40°29′50″N 43°57′20″E
- Country: Armenia
- Province: Aragatsotn
- Municipality: Talin

Area
  - Total: 0.47 km^{2} (0.18 sq mi)
- Elevation: 2,136 m (7,008 ft)

Population (2011)
  - Total: 391
  - Density: 830/km^{2} (2,200/sq mi)
- Time zone: UTC+4
  - Summer (DST): UTC+5

Garnahovit (Armenian: Գառնահովիտ) is a village in the Talin Municipality of the Aragatsotn Province of Armenia. The village has an imposing mid-7th century church of S. Gevorg. There are other church remains in the gorge to the east and Urartian remains nearby to the east and southeast.
