= Diocese of Aragatsotn =

Diocese of Aragatsotn Արագածոտնի թեմ
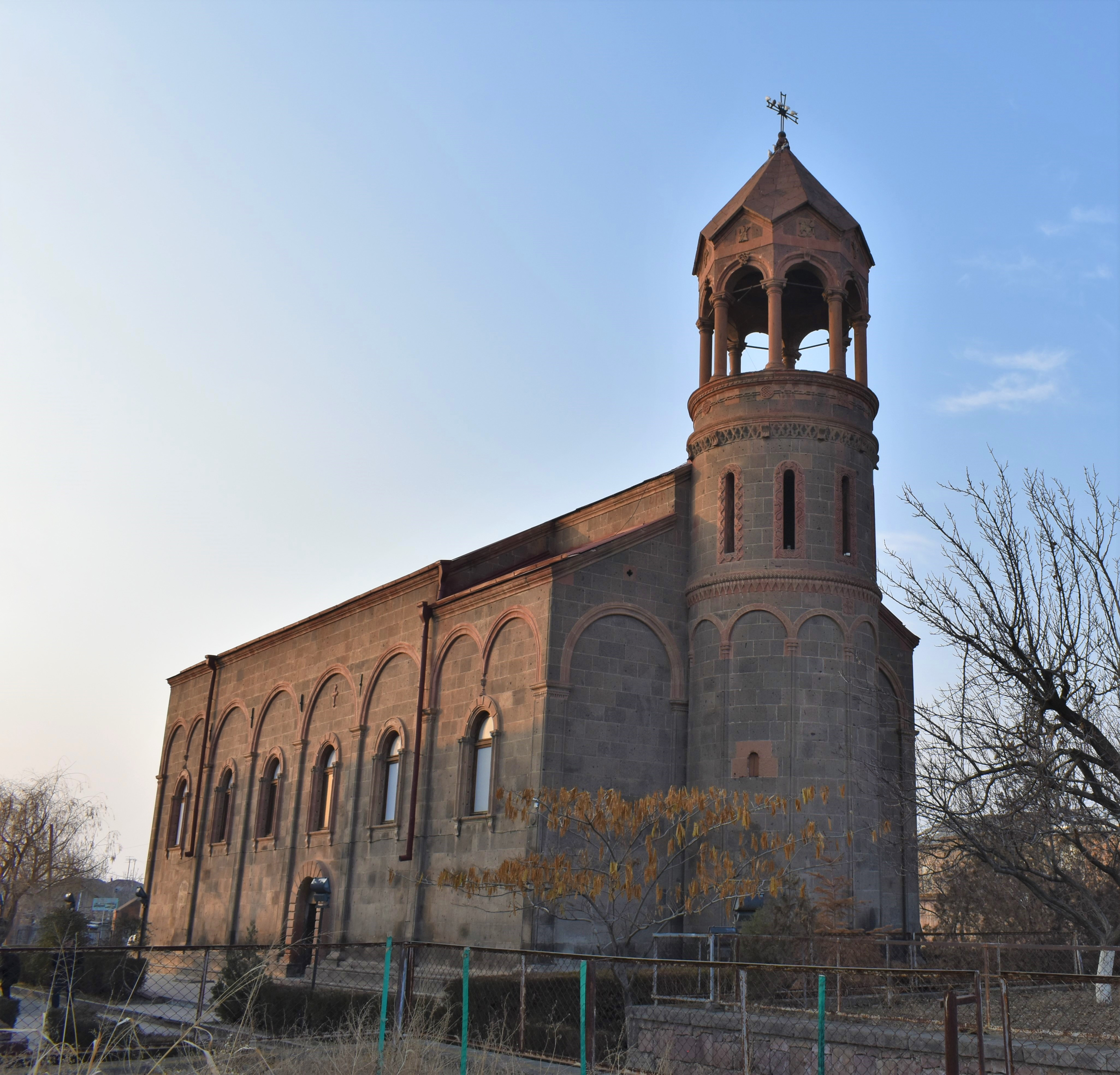
- Saint Mesrop Mashtots Church in Oshakan

Location
- Country: Armenia

Statistics
- Population: Total: (as of 2011); ~120,000

Information
- Denomination: Armenian Apostolic Church
- Rite: Armenian Rite
- Established: 1996
- Cathedral: Saint Mesrop Mashtots Church, Oshakan

Current leadership
- Patriarch: Karekin II
- Primate: Bishop Mkrtich Proshyan

Website
- Official website

Diocese of Aragatsotn (Armenian: Արագածոտնի թեմ Aragatsotni t'em), is a diocese of the Armenian Apostolic Church covering the Aragatsotn Province of Armenia. The name is derived from the historic Aragatsotn canton of Ayrarat province of Kingdom of Armenia.

The diocese was officially founded on May 30, 1996, by Catholicos Karekin I. The diocesan headquarters are located in the provincial capital Ashtarak, while the cathedral of the diocese is the Saint Mesrop Mashtots Church in the nearby village of Oshakan. Bishop Mkrtich Broshyan is currently the primate of the diocese, serving since 2009.

== History ==
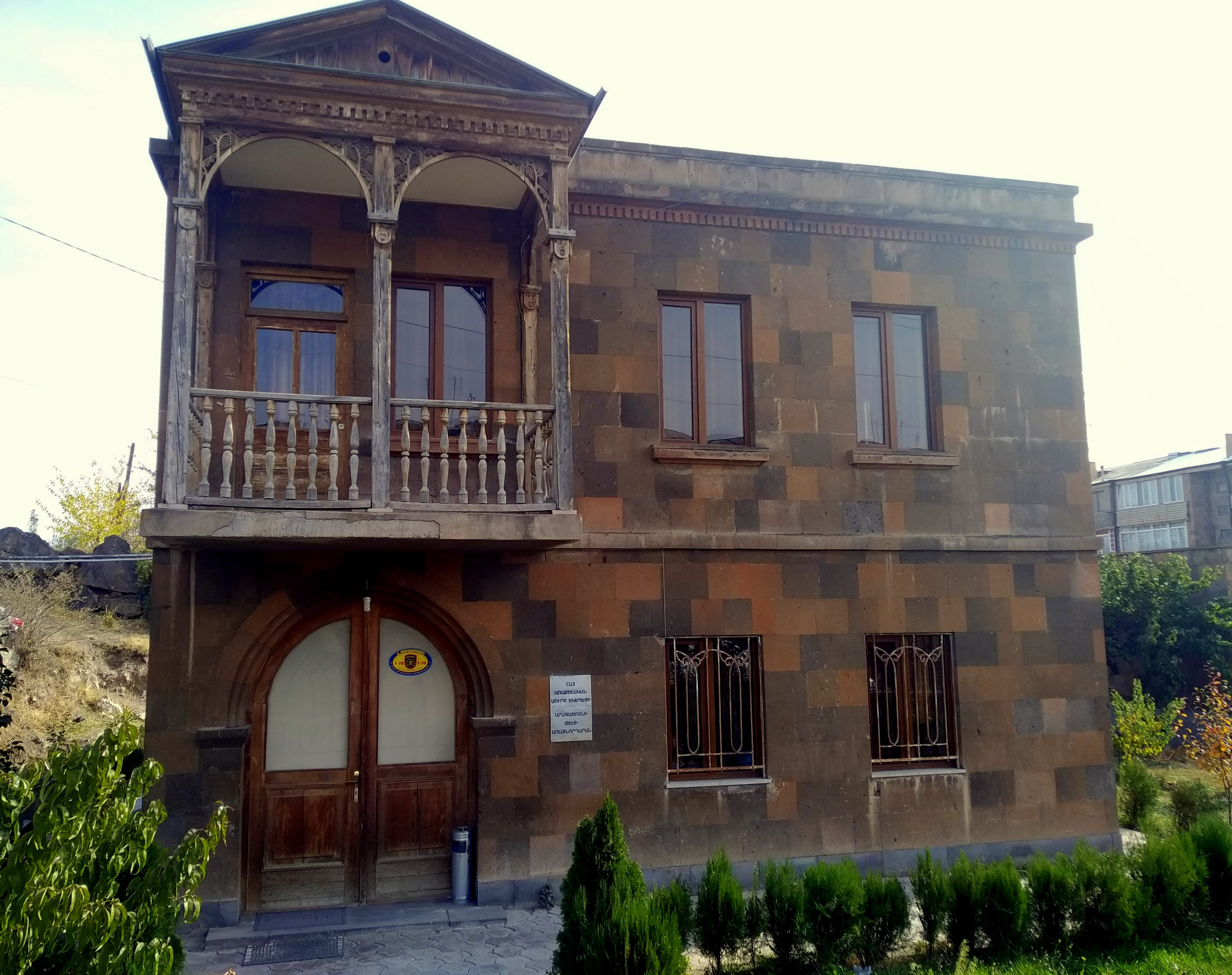
The prelacy building located near the Church of Saint Marianeh in Ashtarak

Historically, the territory of modern-day Aragatsotn has been regulated by the Araratian Pontifical Diocese and the Diocese of Shirak. The towns of Ashtarak and Aparan along with their villages were under the jurisdiction of the Araratian diocese, while the town of Talin and the surrounding areas were under the jurisdiction of Shirak diocese.

After the independence from the Soviet Union, Armenia has been divided into provinces based on the territorial administration reform of 1995. During the following year, the Diocese of Aragatsotn was officially founded upon a kontakion issued by Catholicos Karekin I on May 30, 1996. The Saint Mesrop Mashtots Church in Oshakan has served as the seat of the diocese since the formation of the diocese.

Currently, the Aragatsotn diocese has 29 churches and 9 chapels under its jurisdiction.

== Primates ==
- Bishop Navasard Kchoyan 1996–1999
- Bishop Vazgen Mirzakhanyan 1999–2002
- Bishop Bagrat Galstanyan 2002–2003
- Archimandrite Torgom Tonikyan 2003–2007
- Archimandrite Grigor Khachatryan 2007–2009
- Bishop Mkrtich Proshyan 2009–present

== Active churches ==
Here is the list of churches, monasteries and chapels functioning under the jurisdiction of the Diocese of Aragatsotn, along with their location and year of consecration:

=== Churches ===
- Kasagh Basilica of the Holy Cross, Aparan, 4th-5th centuries
- Church of Saint John, Mastara, 5th century
- Karmravor Church, Ashtarak, 7th century
- Saint Stephen Church, Kosh, 7th century
- Surp Hovhannes Church, Byurakan, 10th century
- Church of the Holy Mother of God, Otevan, 11th century
- Church of the Holy Mother of God, Ashnak, 11th century, rebuilt in 2013
- Saint Marianeh Church, Ashtarak, 1271 (the current seat)
- Saint Gregory Church, Parpi, 13th century
- Saint Sarkis Church, Ashtarak, 17th century
- Surp Astvatsatsin Church, Karbi, 1693
- Saint Mesrop Mashtots Church, Oshakan, 1879
- Surp Hovhannes Church, Melikgyugh, 1891
- Church of the Holy Mother of God, Aparan, 19th century
- Saint George's Church, Talin, 19th century
- Saint Gregory Church, Kosh, 19th century
- Akunk Church, Akunk, 19th century
- Church of the Holy Mother of God, Kuchak, 1900
- Church of the Holy Mother of God, Nor Yedesia, 1999
- Surp Stepanos Church, Chknagh, 2004
- Church of Saint Gregory of Narek, Ghazaravan, completed in 2005 but not yet consecrated
- Surp Nshan Church, Berkarat, 2011
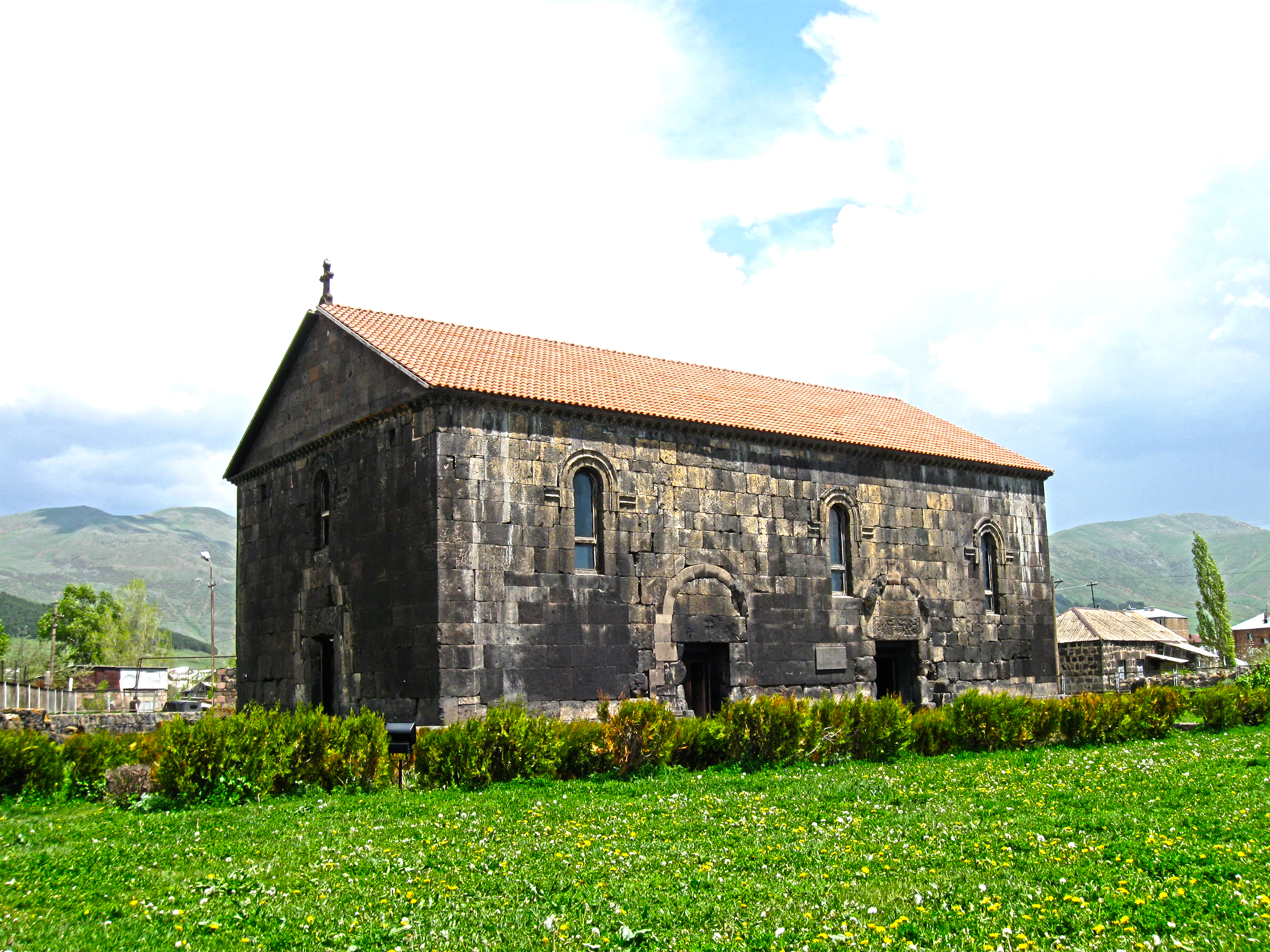
Kasagh Basilica of the Holy Cross, Aparan, 4th-5th centuries

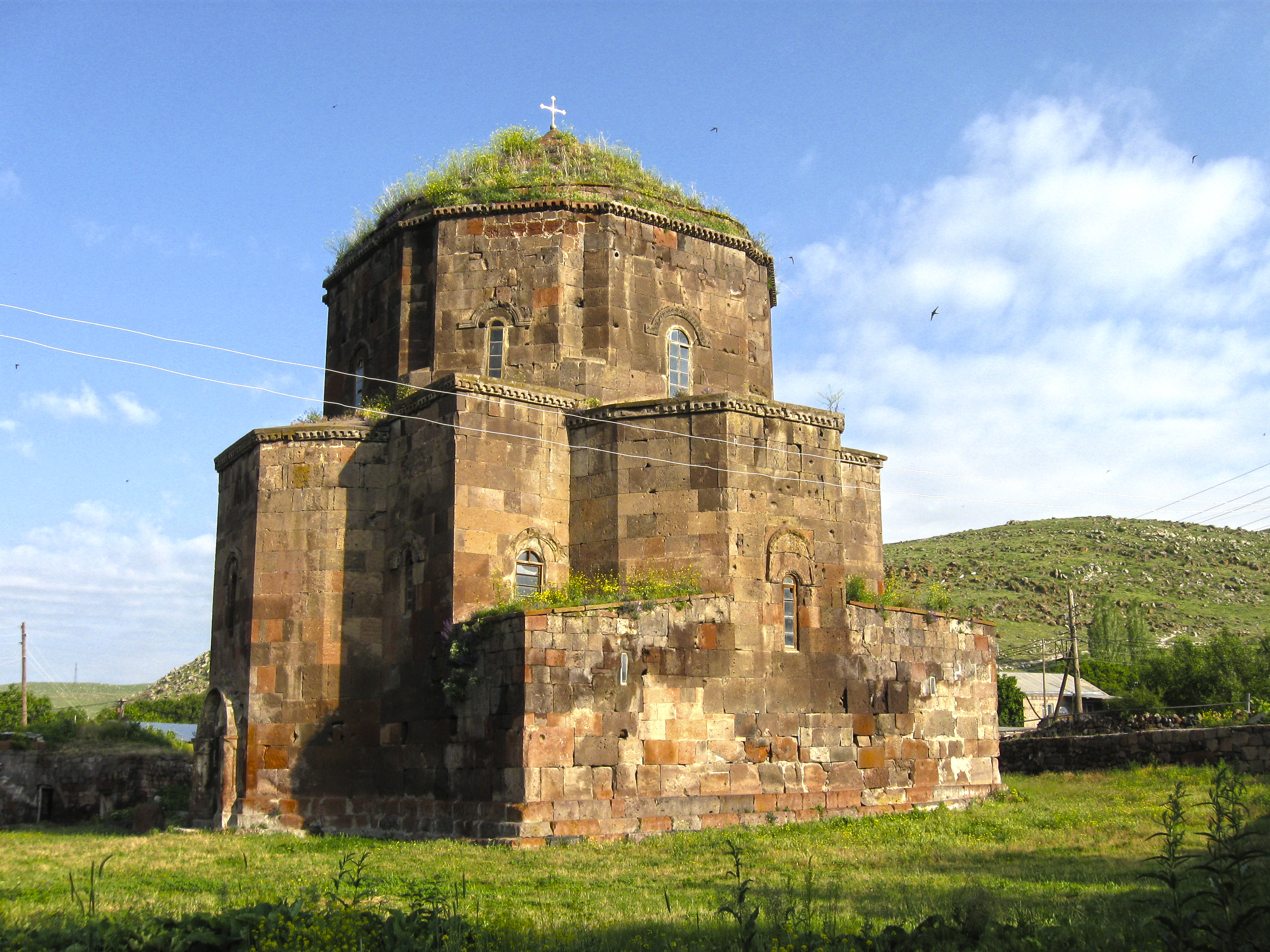
Church of Saint John, Mastara, 5th century

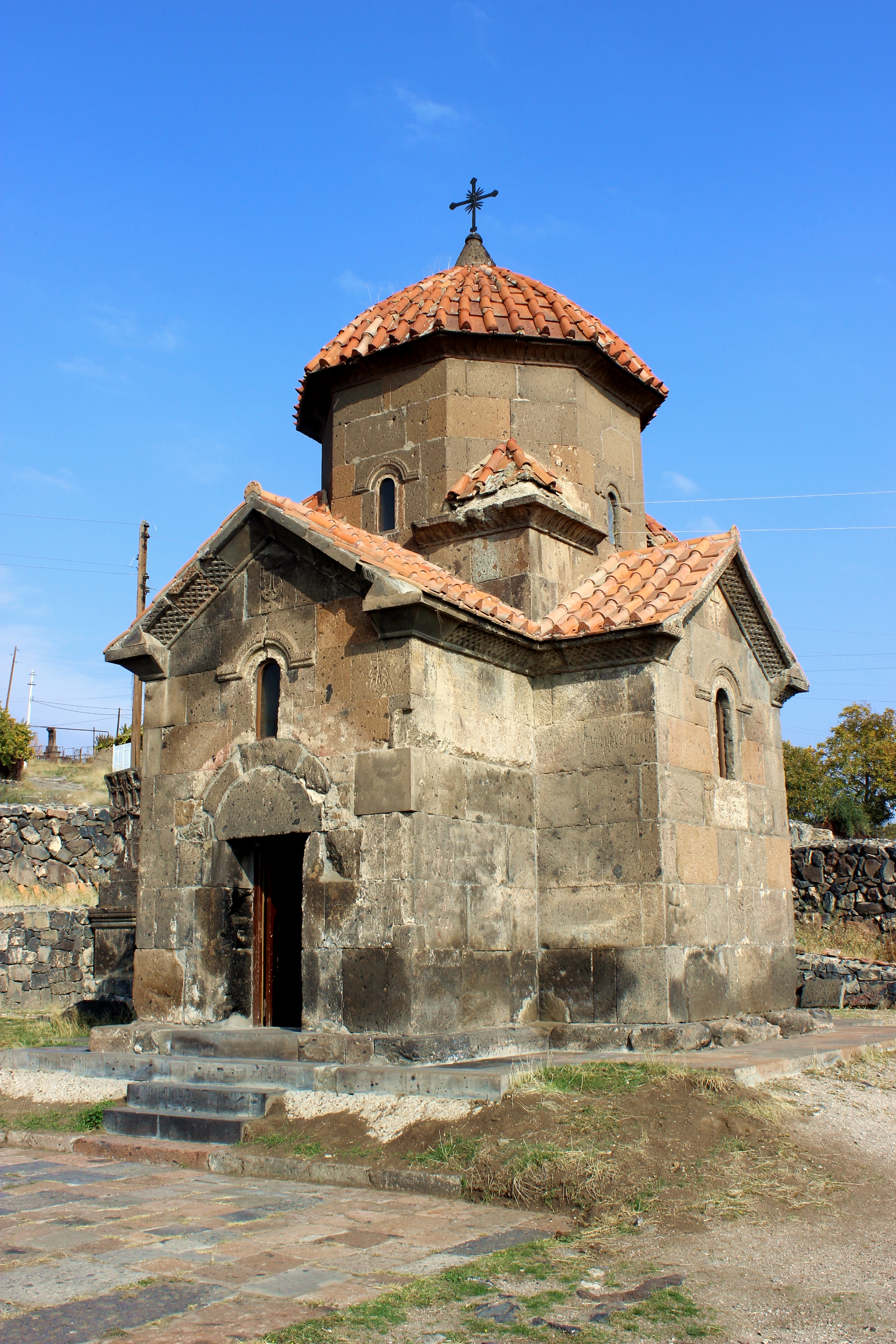
Karmravor Church, Ashtarak, 7th century

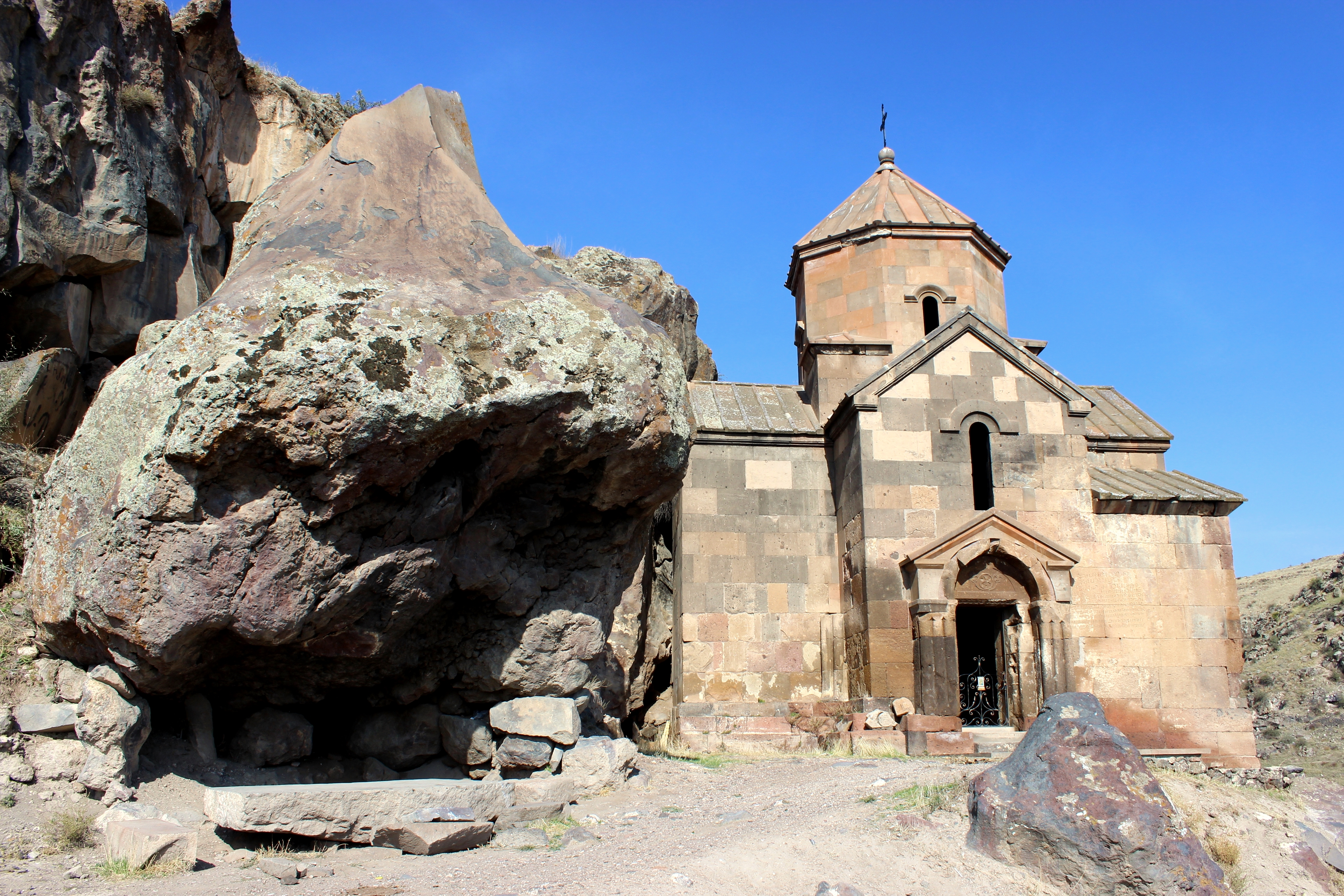
Saint Stephen Church, Kosh, 7th century

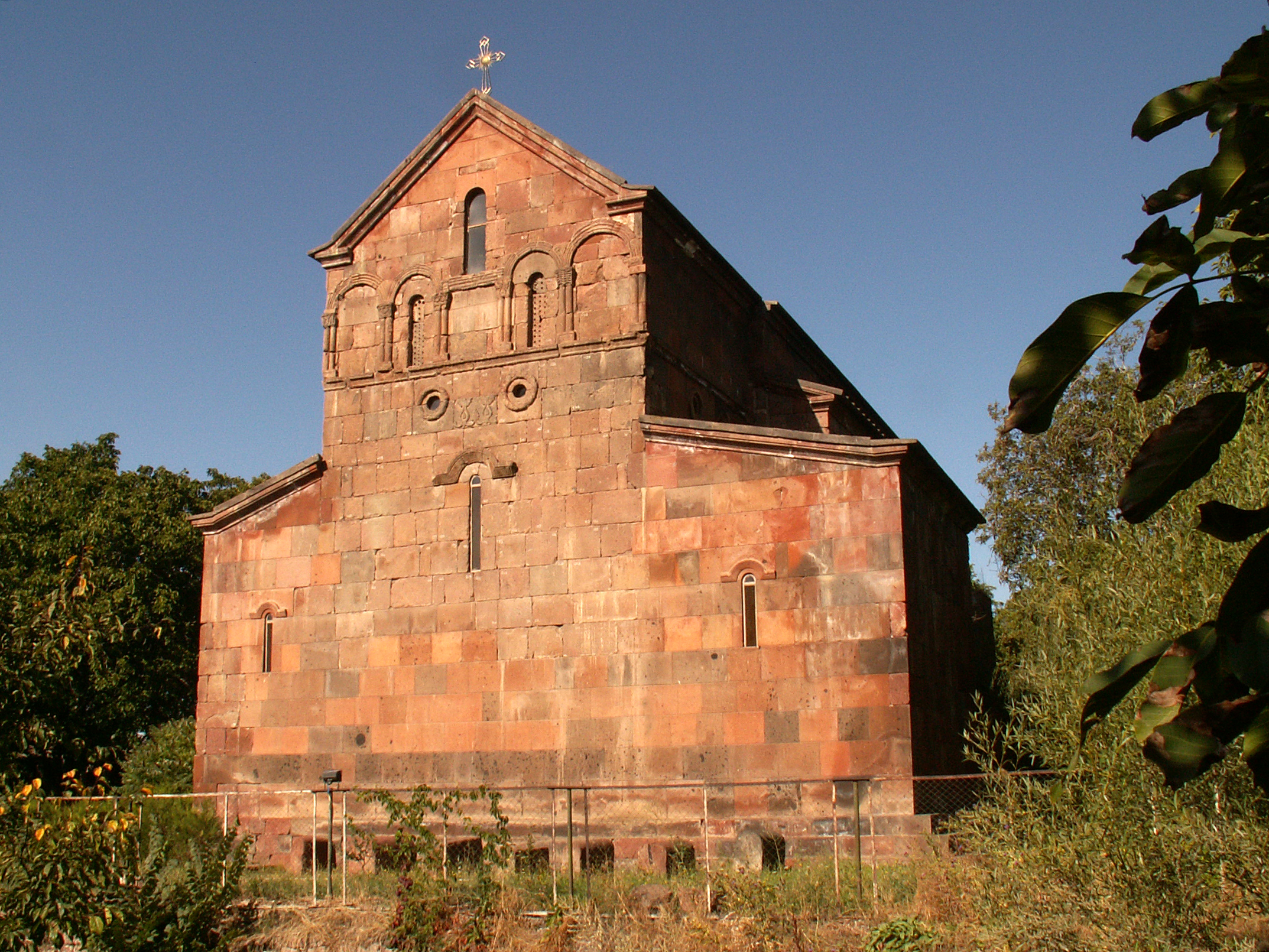
Surp Hovhannes Church, Byurakan, 10th century

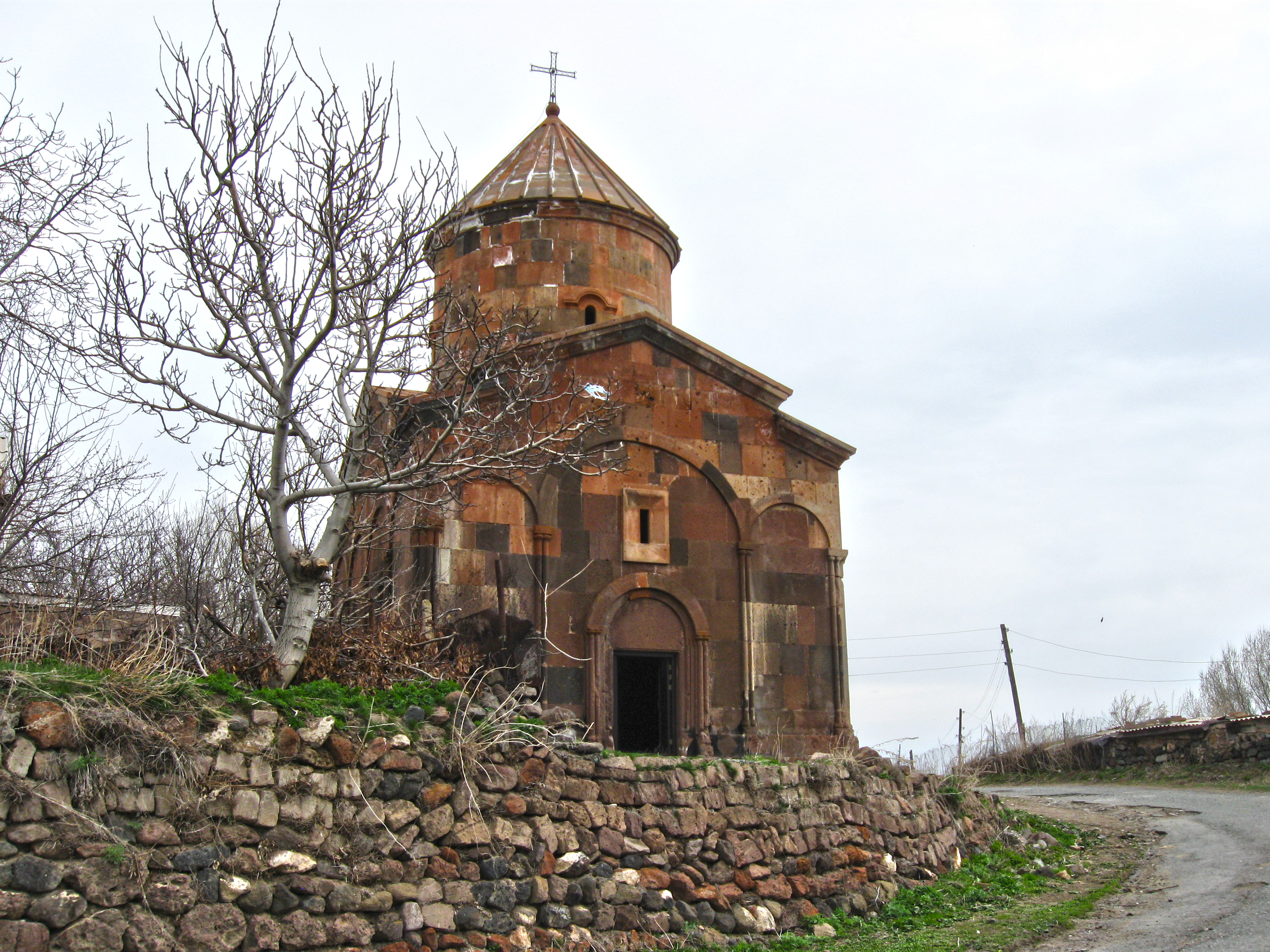
Church of the Holy Mother of God, Otevan, 11th century

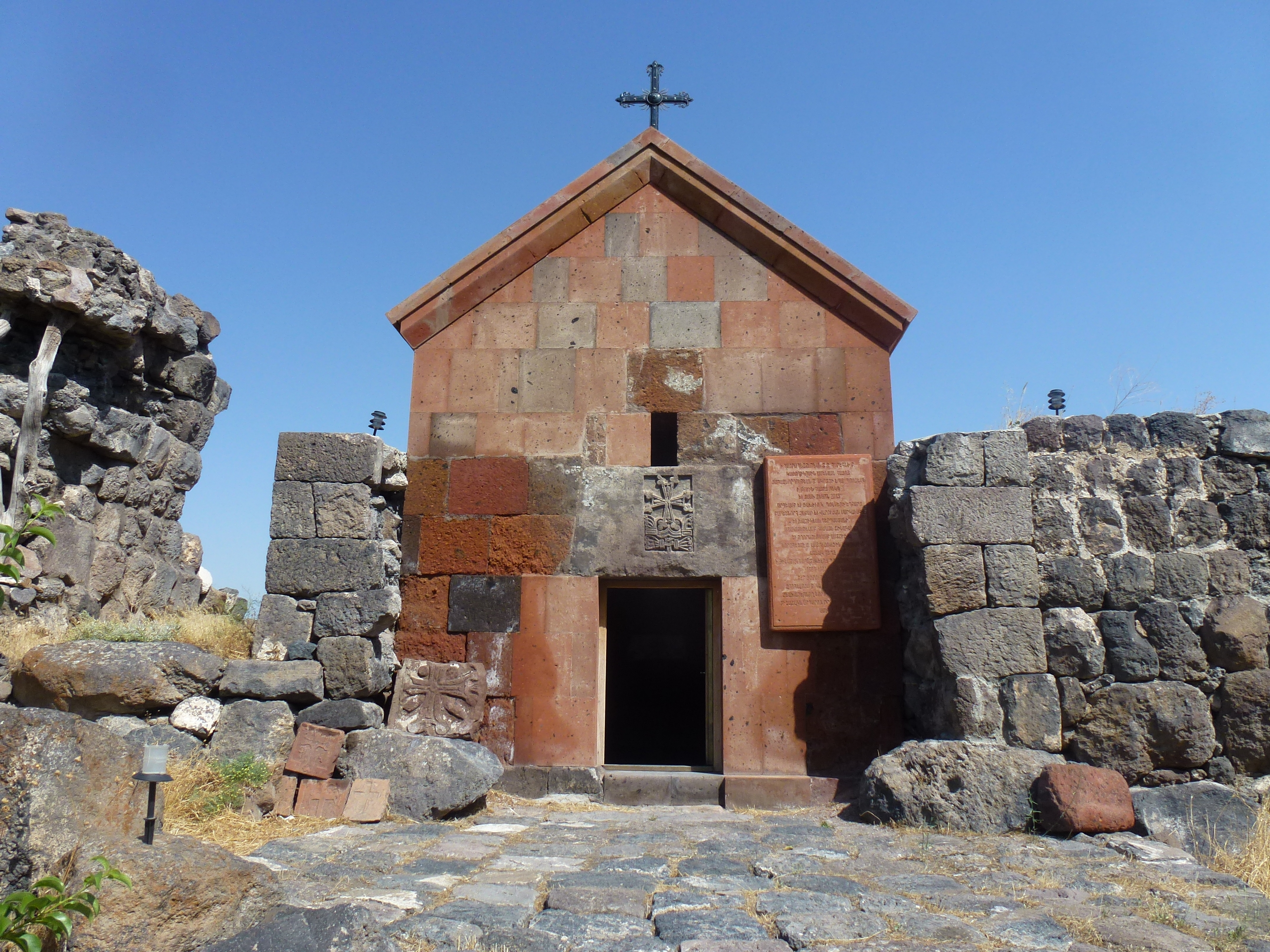
Church of the Holy Mother of God, Ashnak, 11th century, rebuilt in 2013

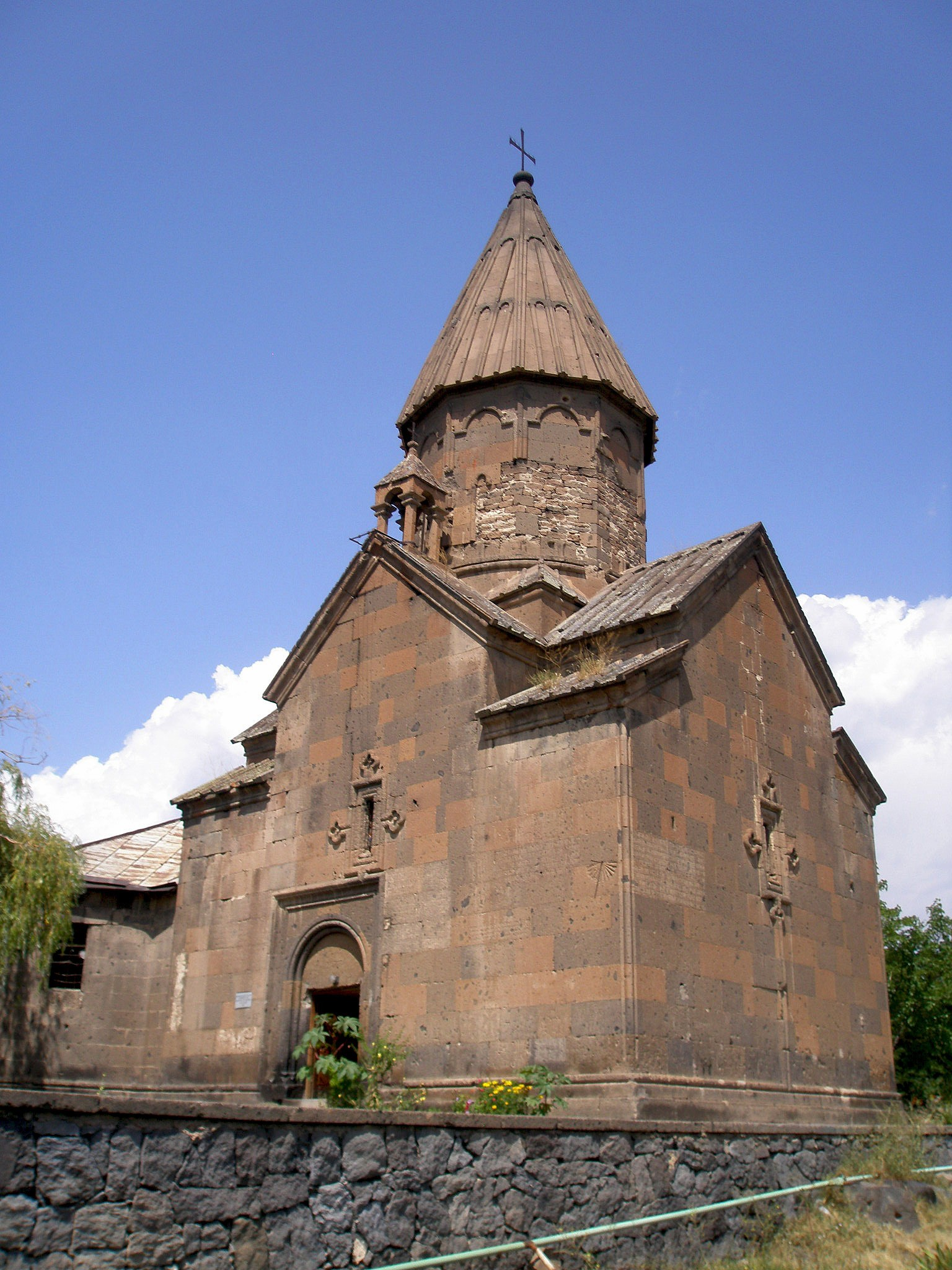
Saint Marianeh Church, Ashtarak, 1271

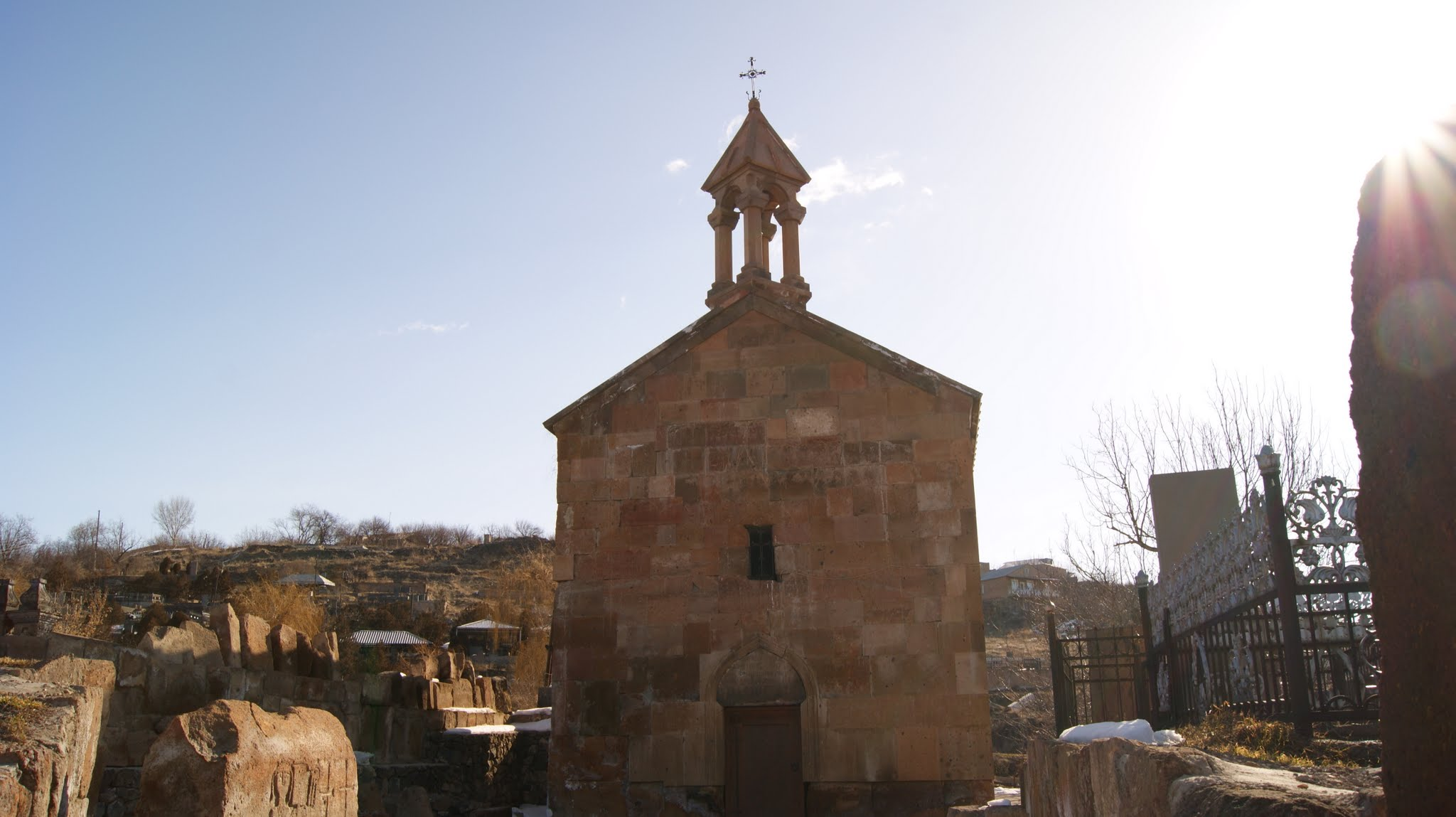
Saint Gregory Church, Parpi, 13th century

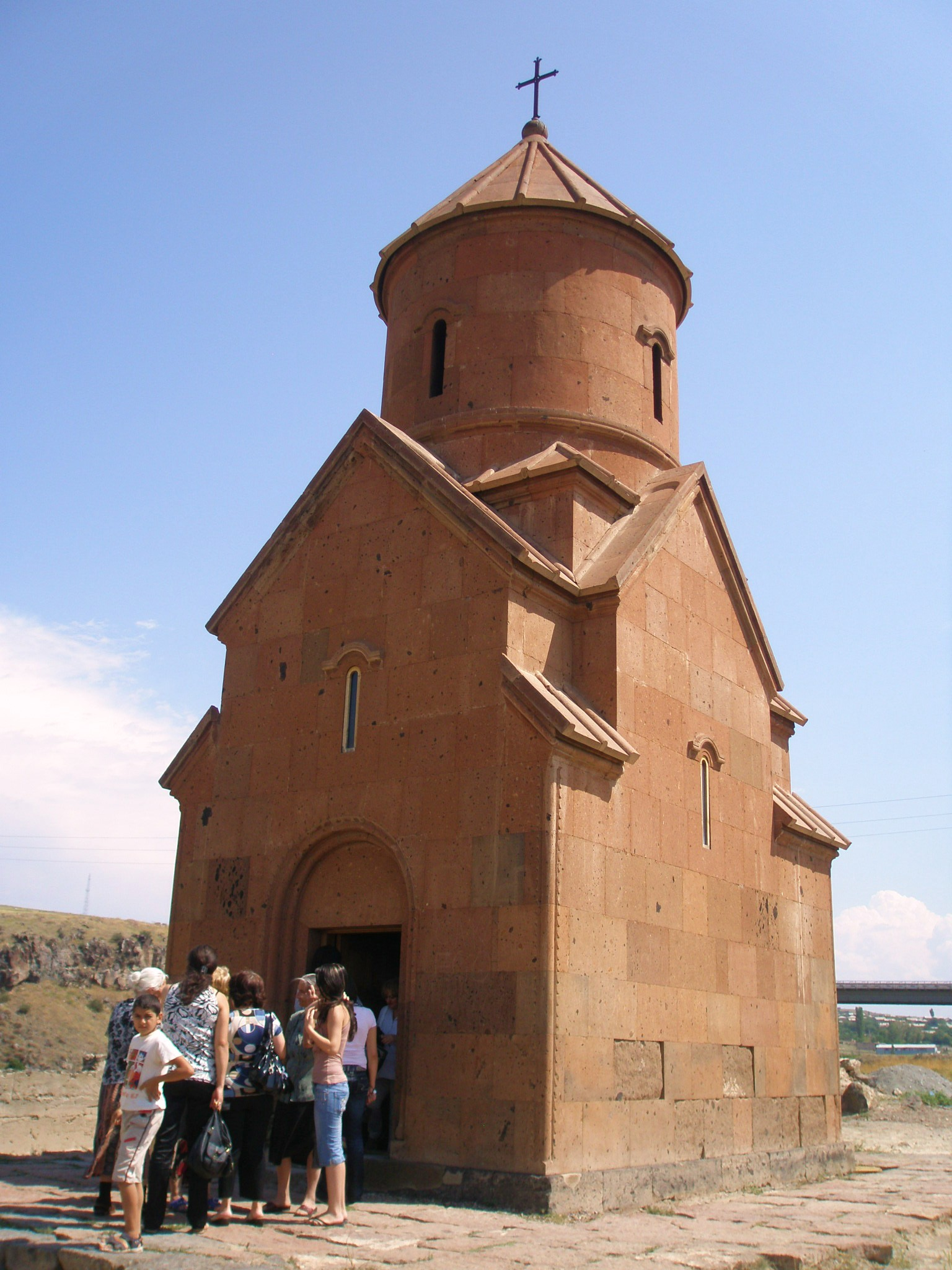
Saint Sarkis Church, Ashtarak, 17th century

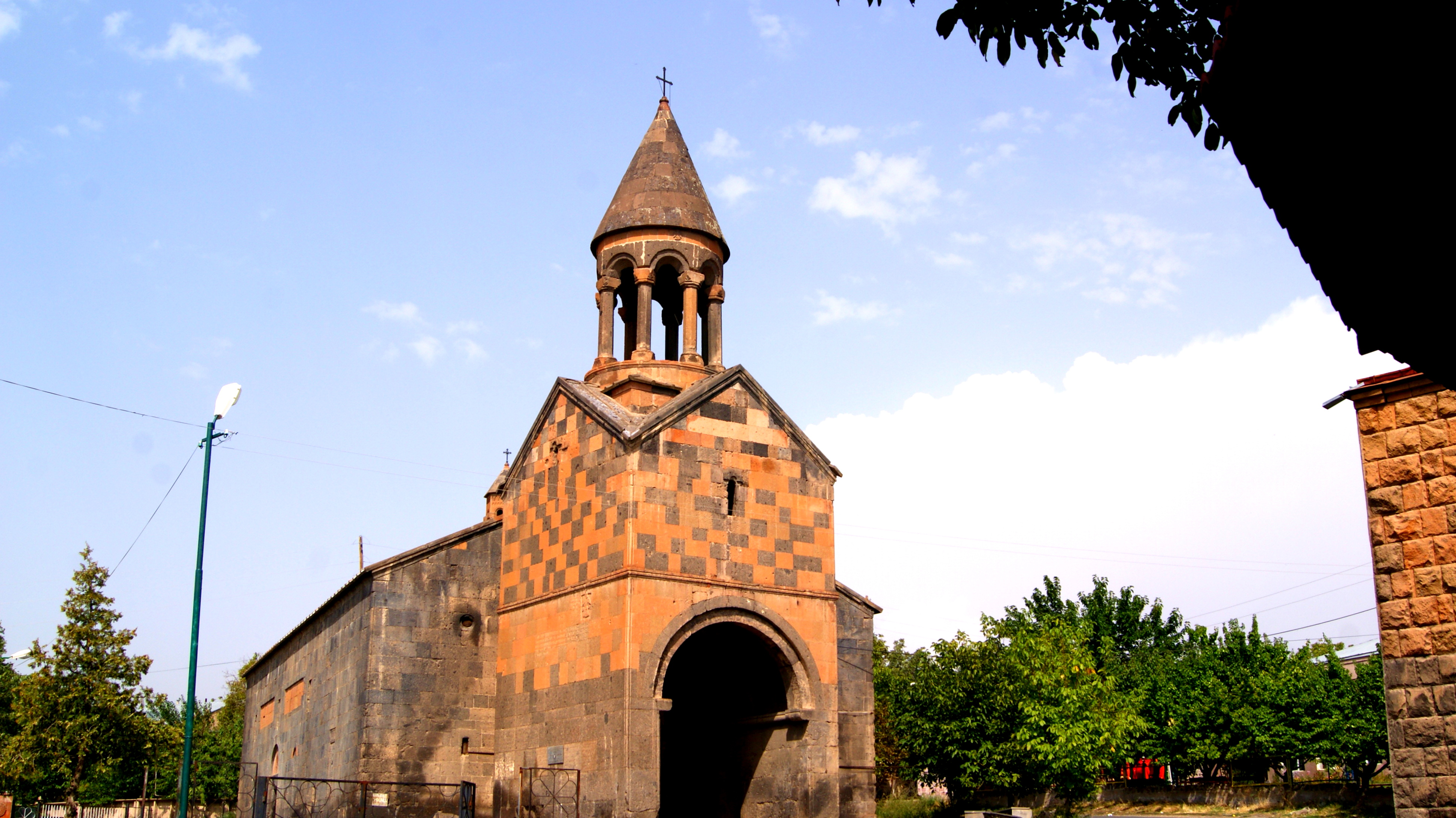
Surp Astvatsatsin Church, Karbi, 1693

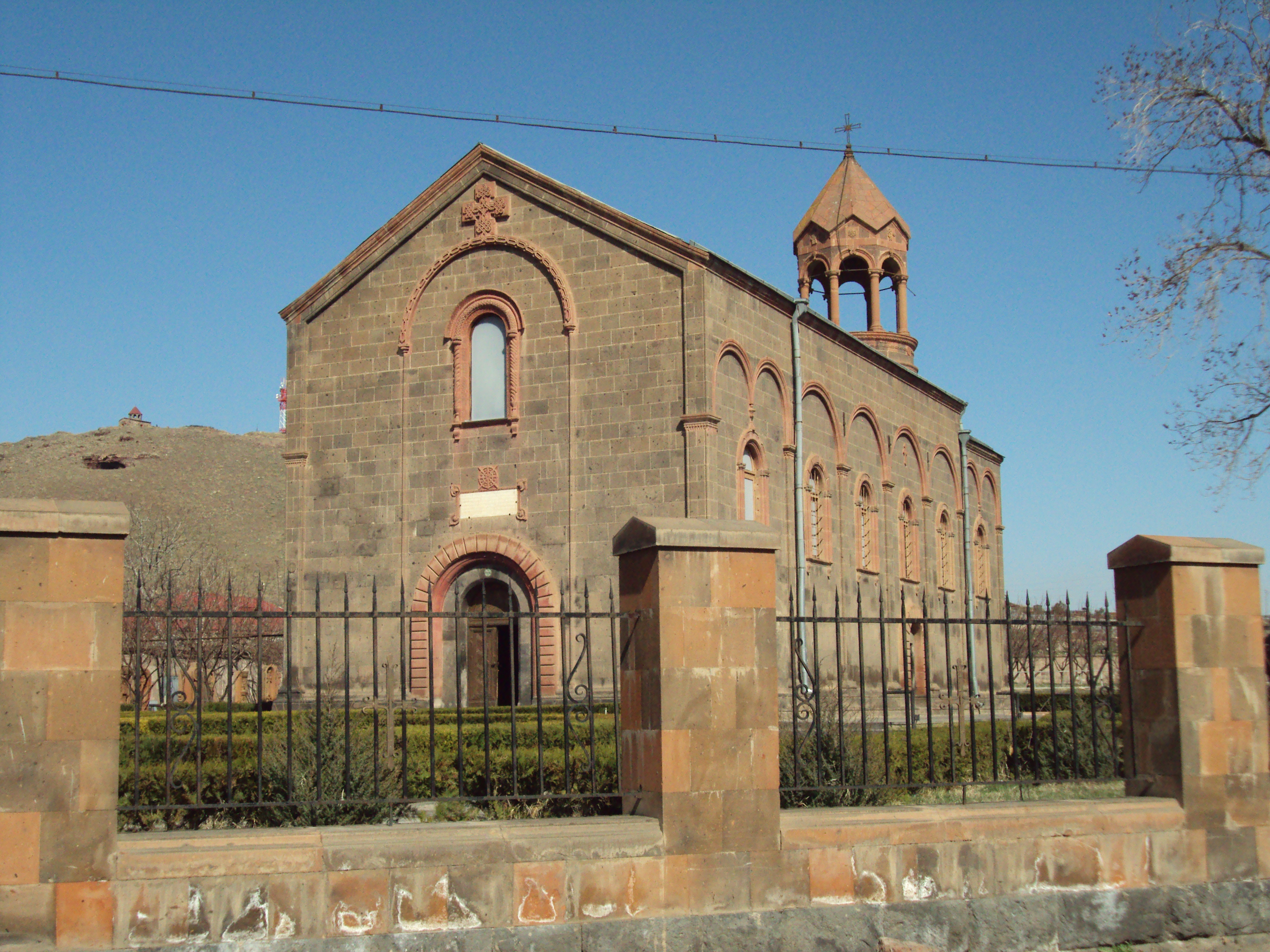
Saint Mesrop Mashtots Church, Oshakan, 1879

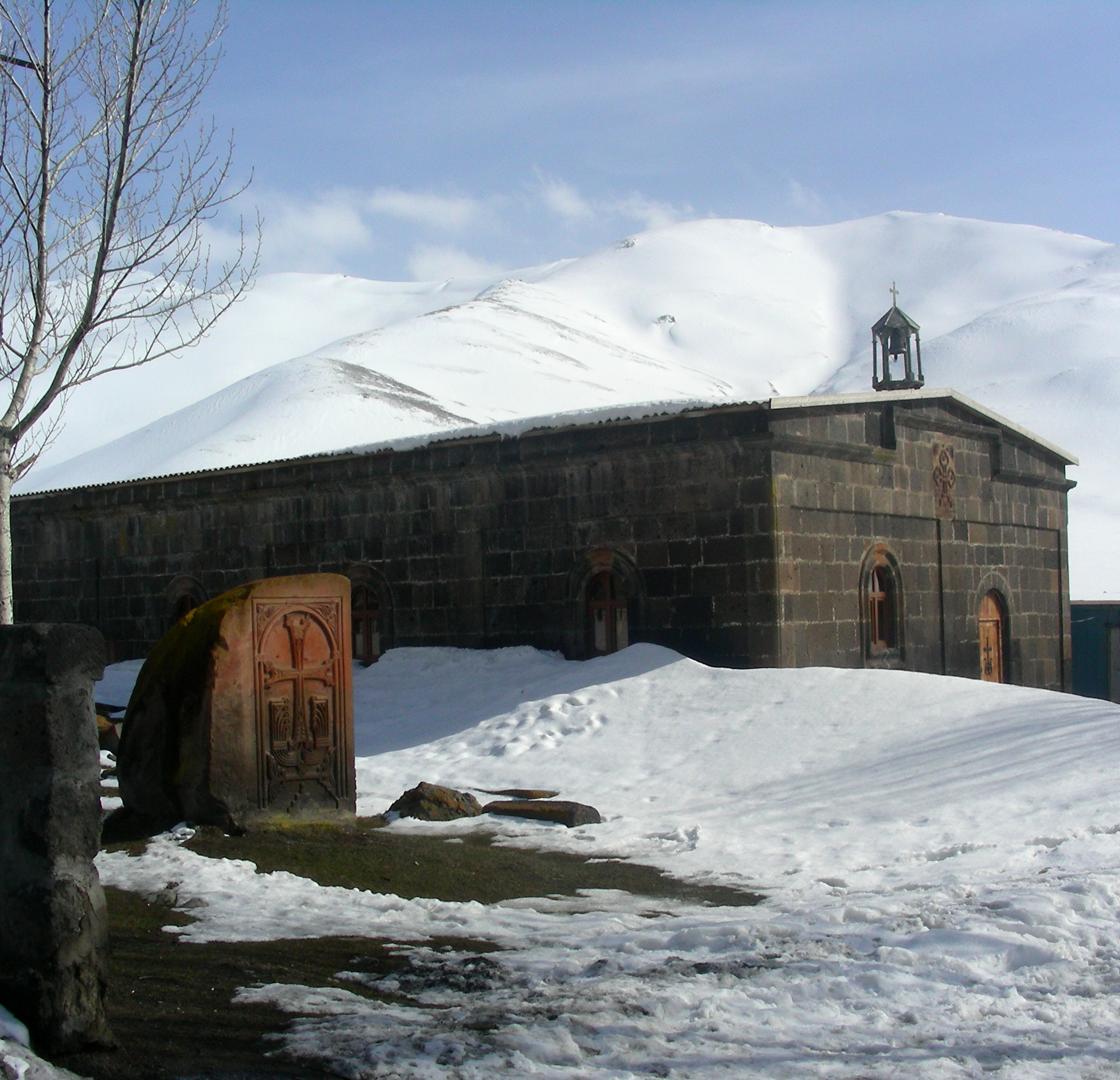
Surp Hovhannes Church, Melikgyugh, 1891

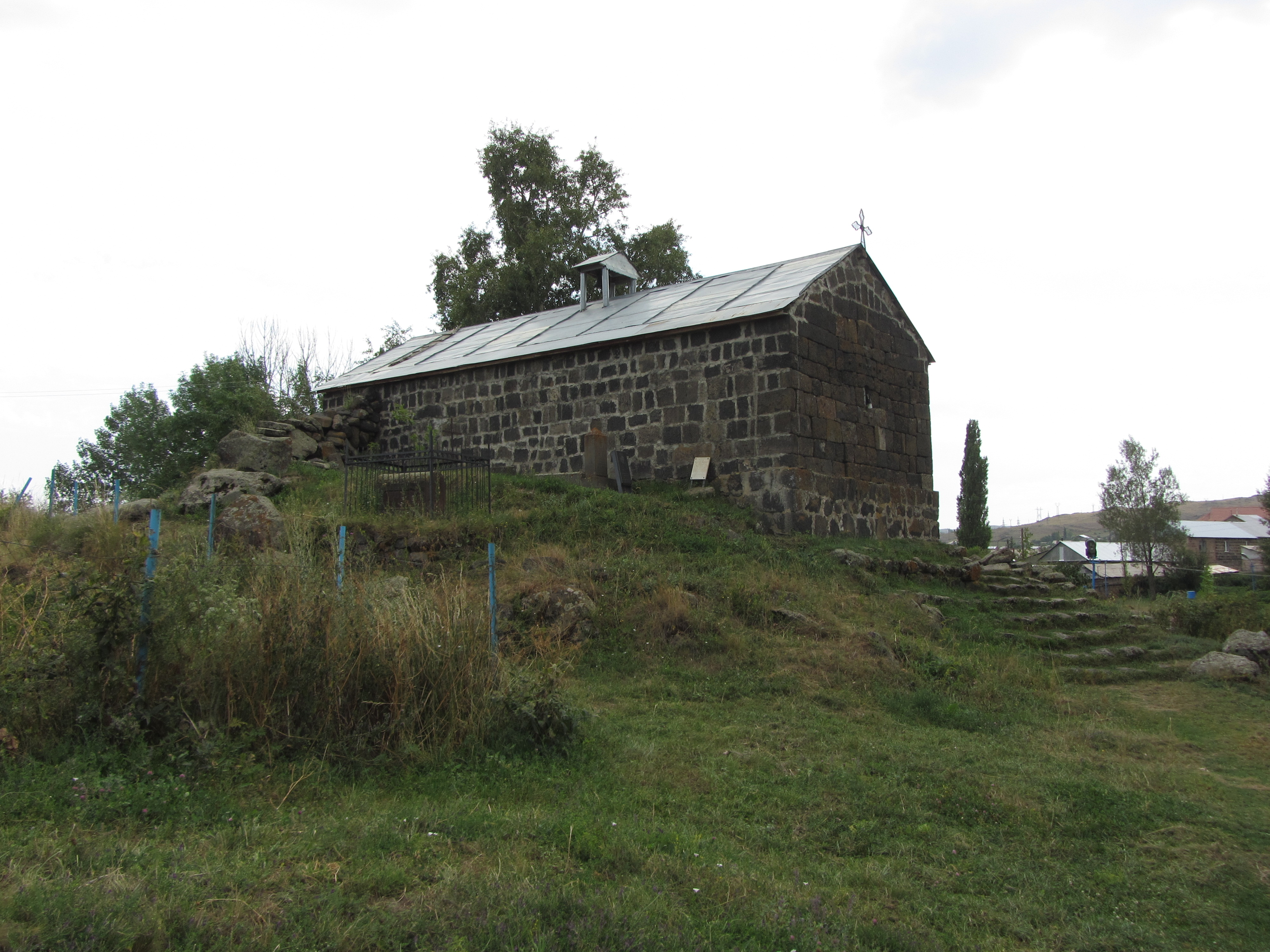
Church of the Holy Mother of God, Aparan, 19th century

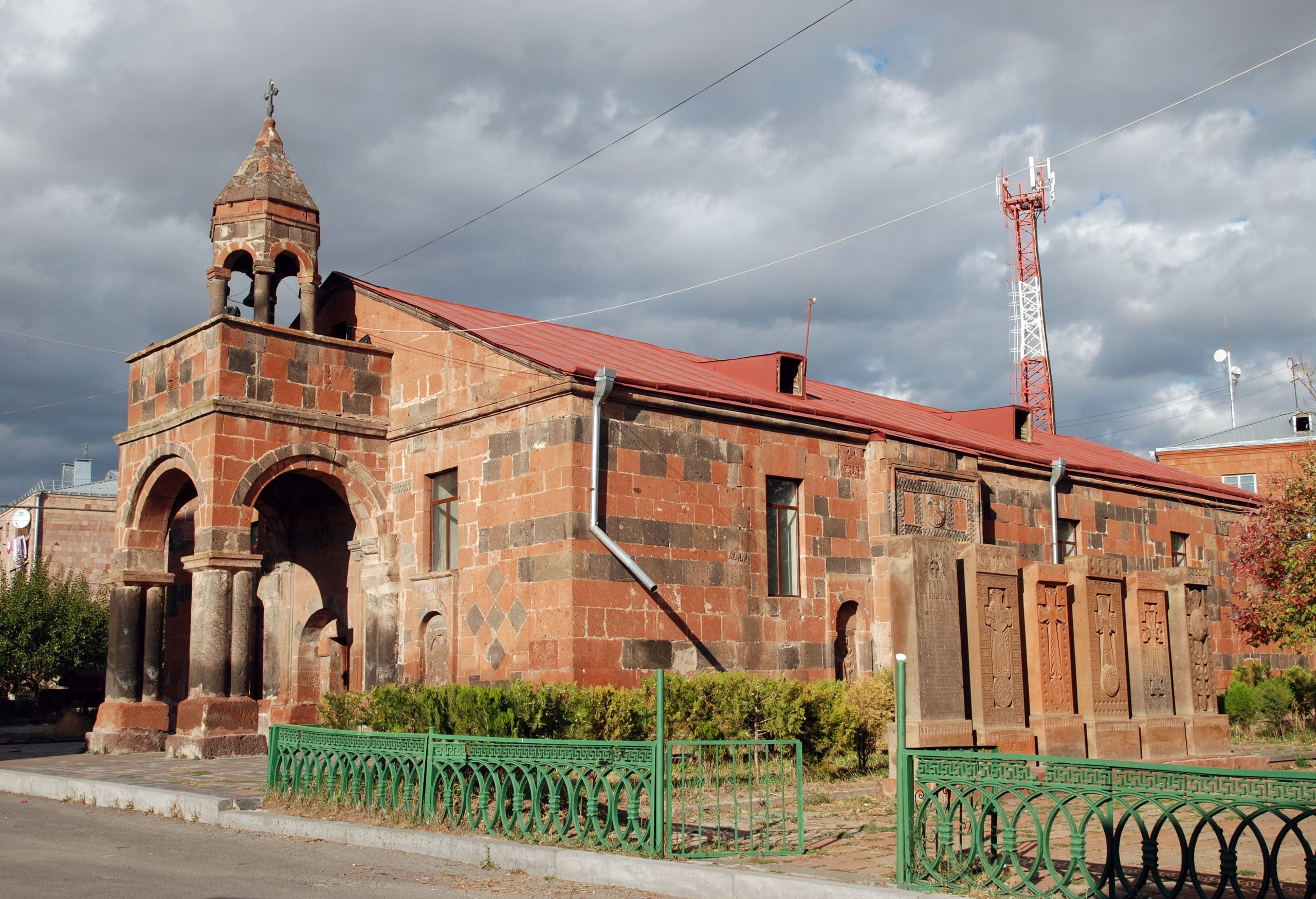
Saint George's Church, Talin, 19th century

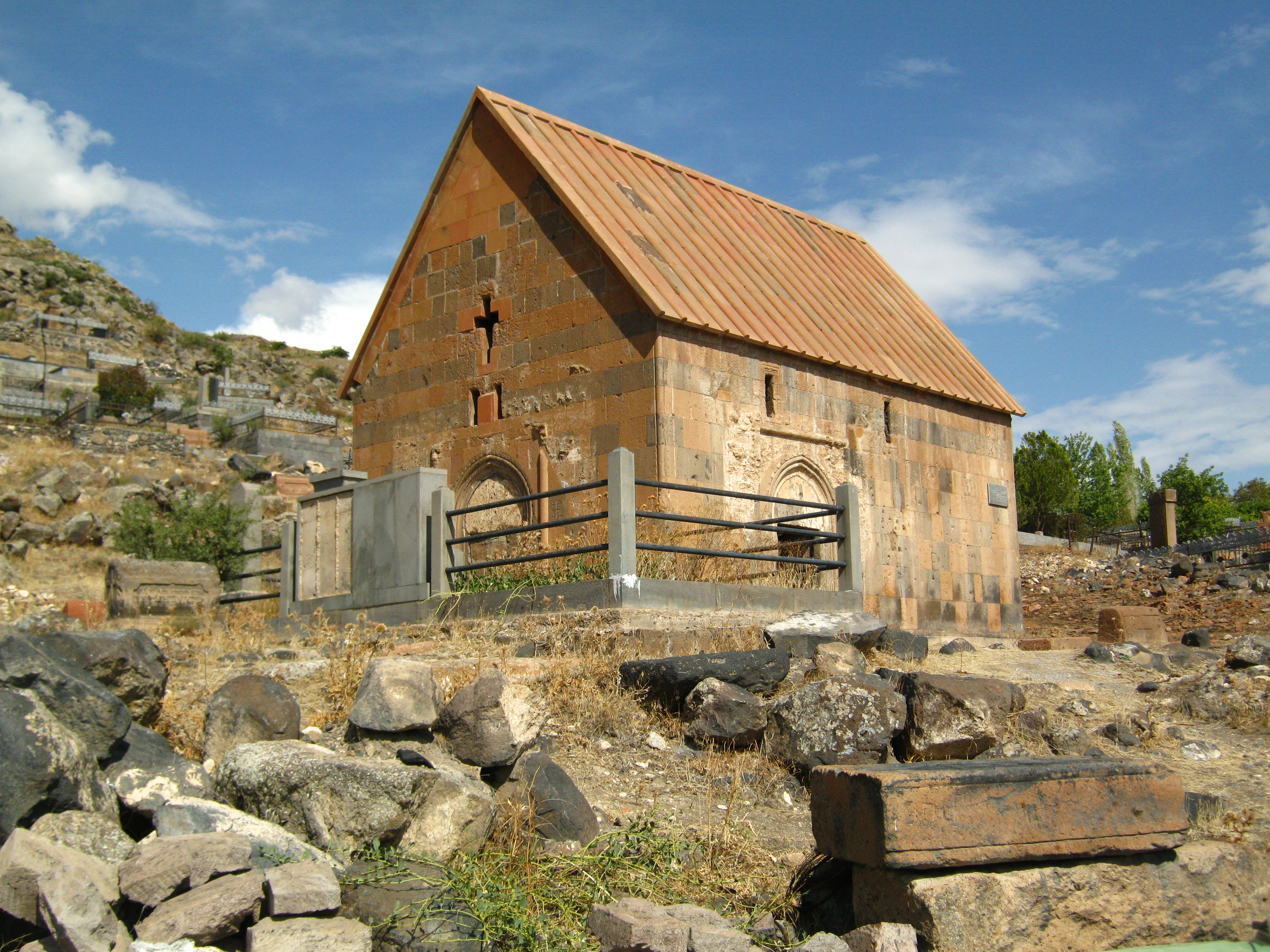
Saint Gregory Church, Kosh, 19th century

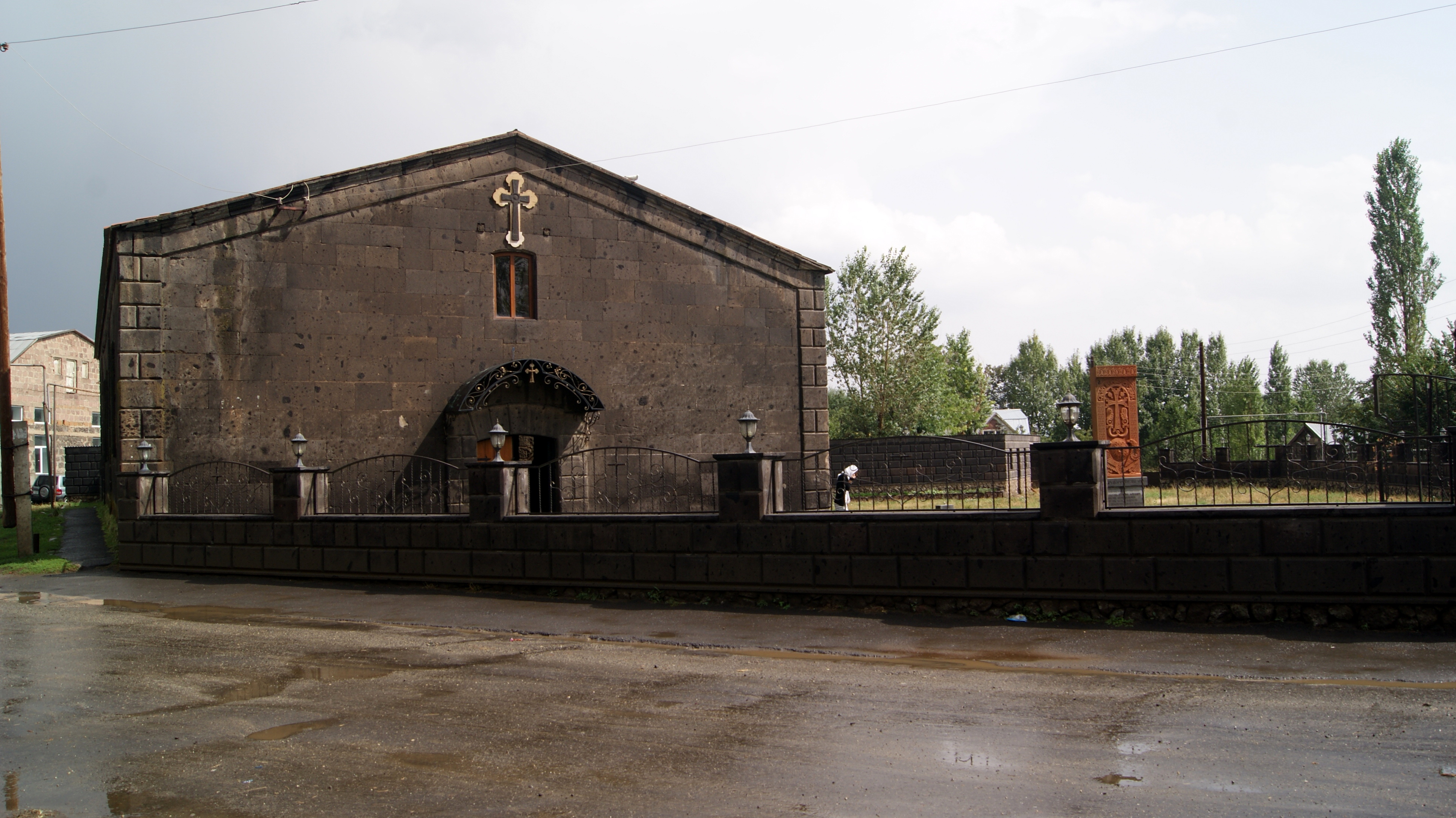
Church of the Holy Mother of God, Kuchak, 1900

=== Monasteries ===
- Hovhannavank Monastery, Ohanavan, 1216
- Saghmosavank Monastery, Saghmosavan, 1221
- Tegher Monastery near Tegher, 13th century
- Saint Gevork Monastery, Mughni, 14th century
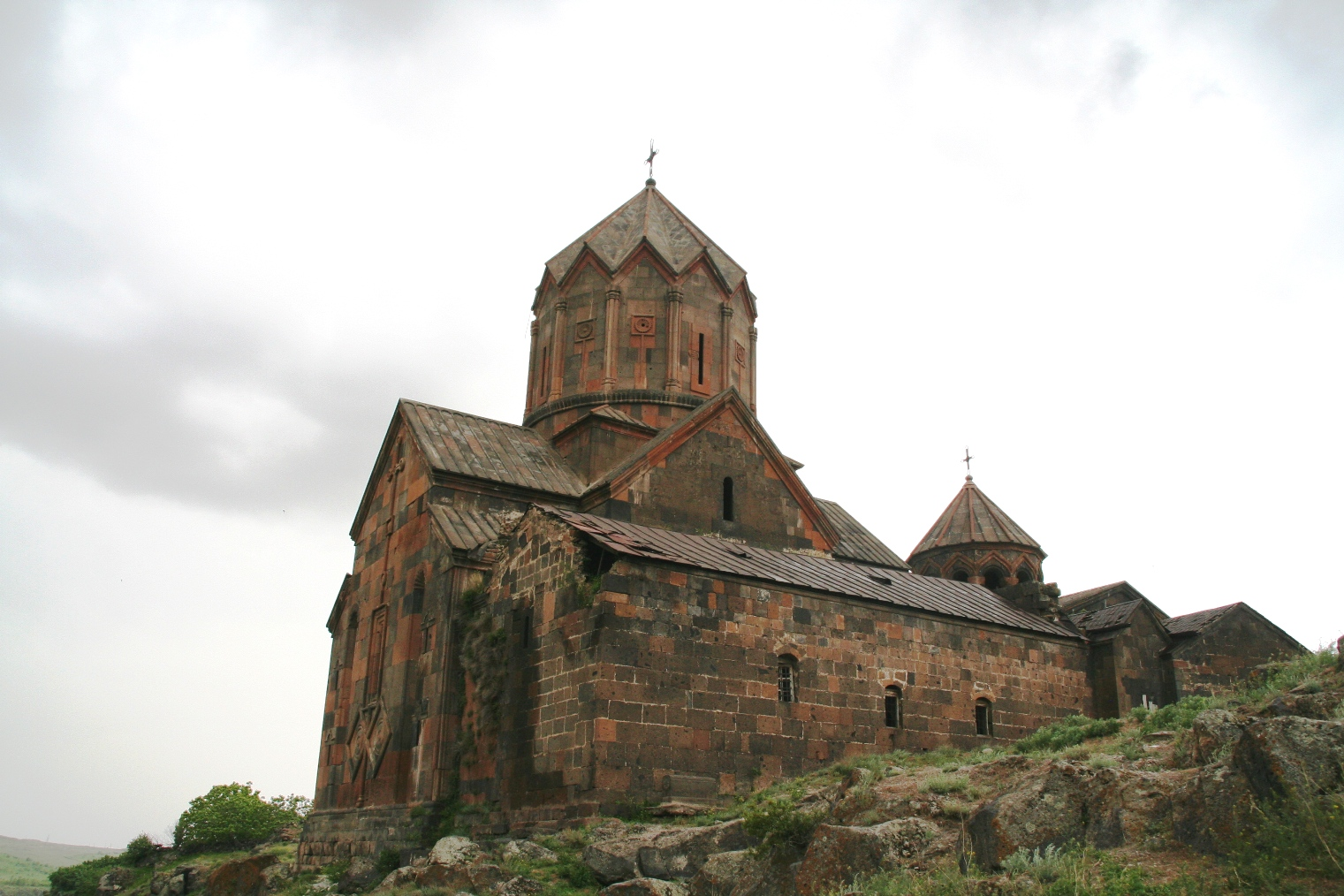
Hovhannavank Monastery, Ohannavan, 1216

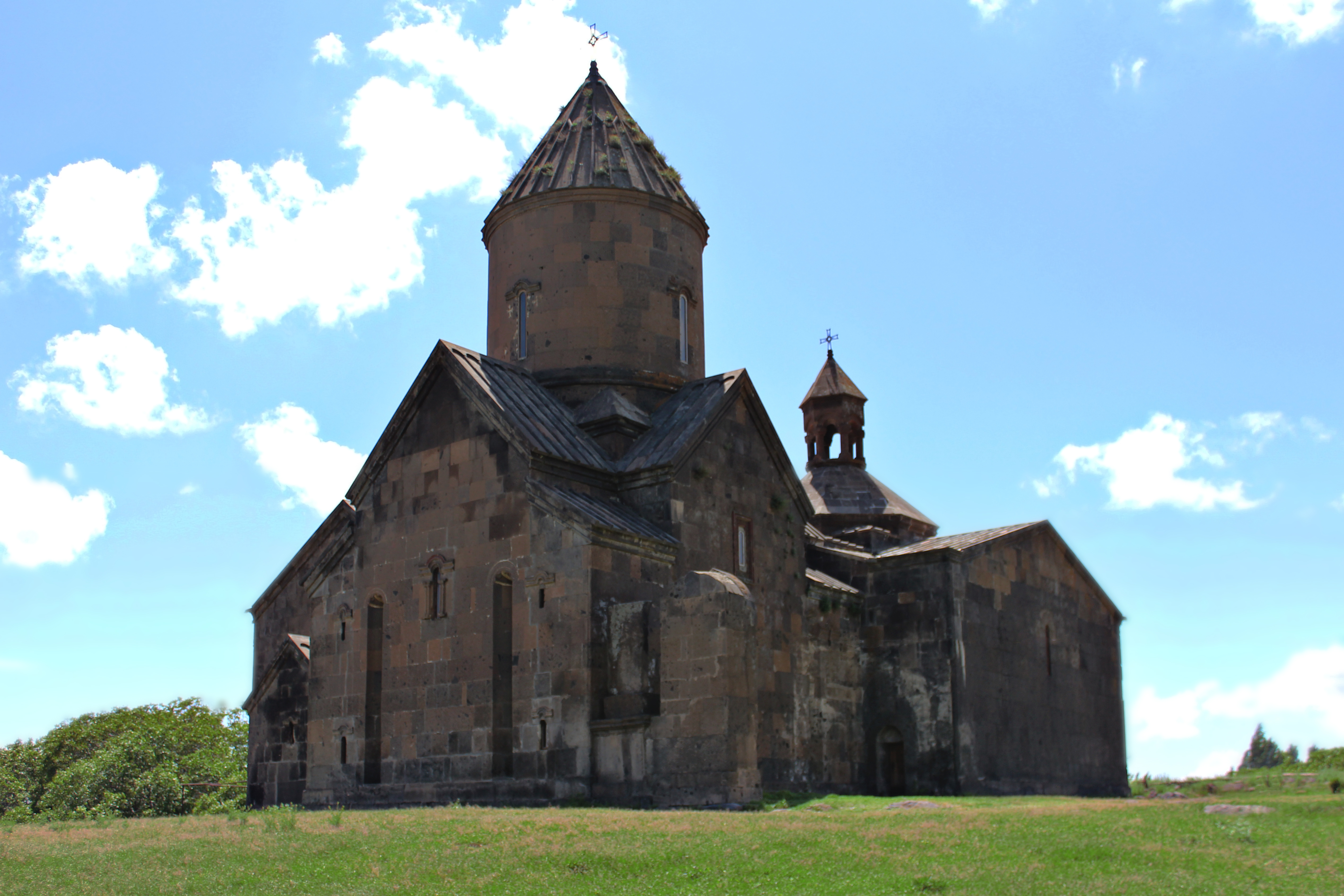
Saghmosavank Monastery, Saghmosavan, 1221

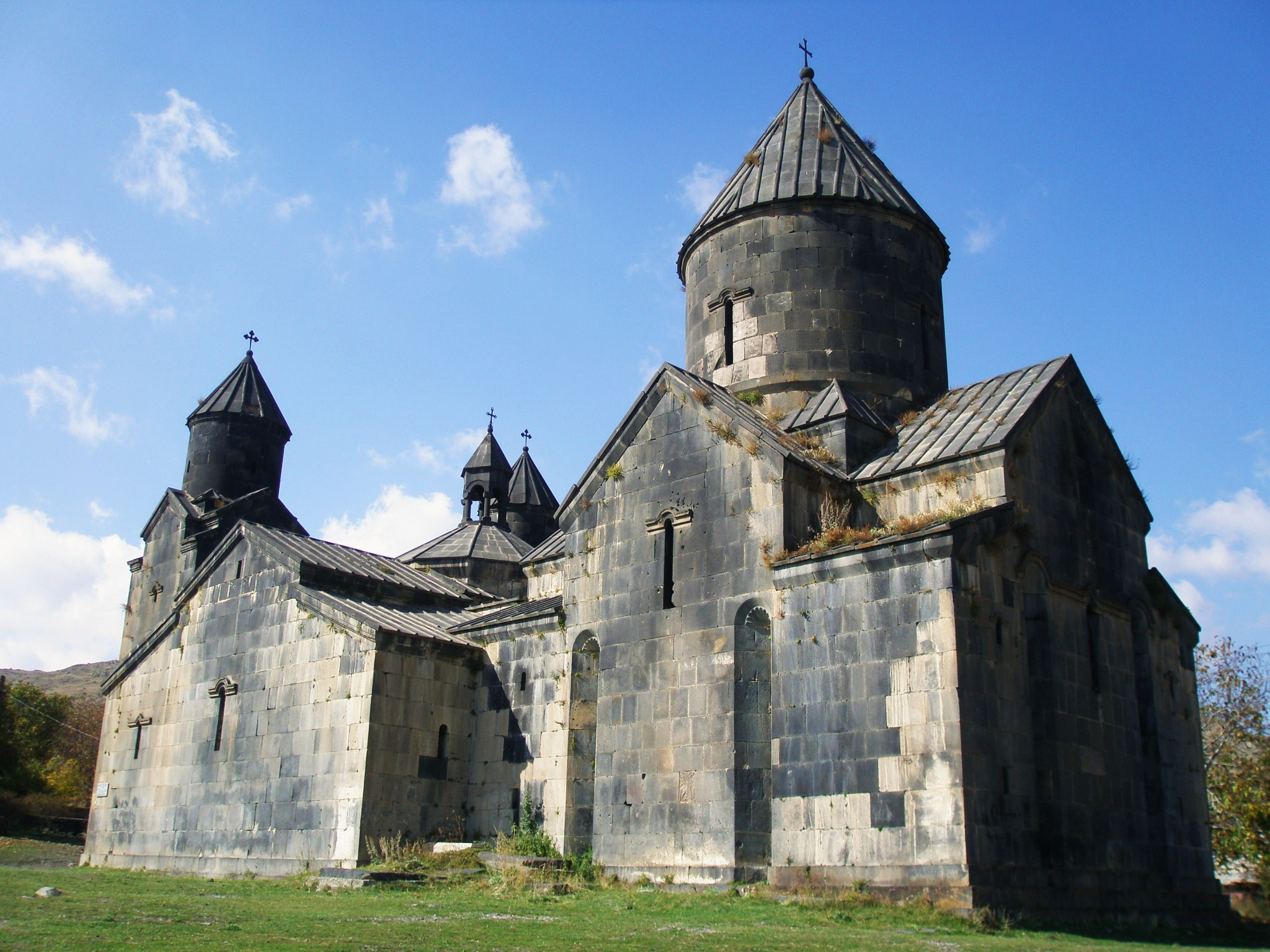
Tegher Monastery near Tegher, 13th century

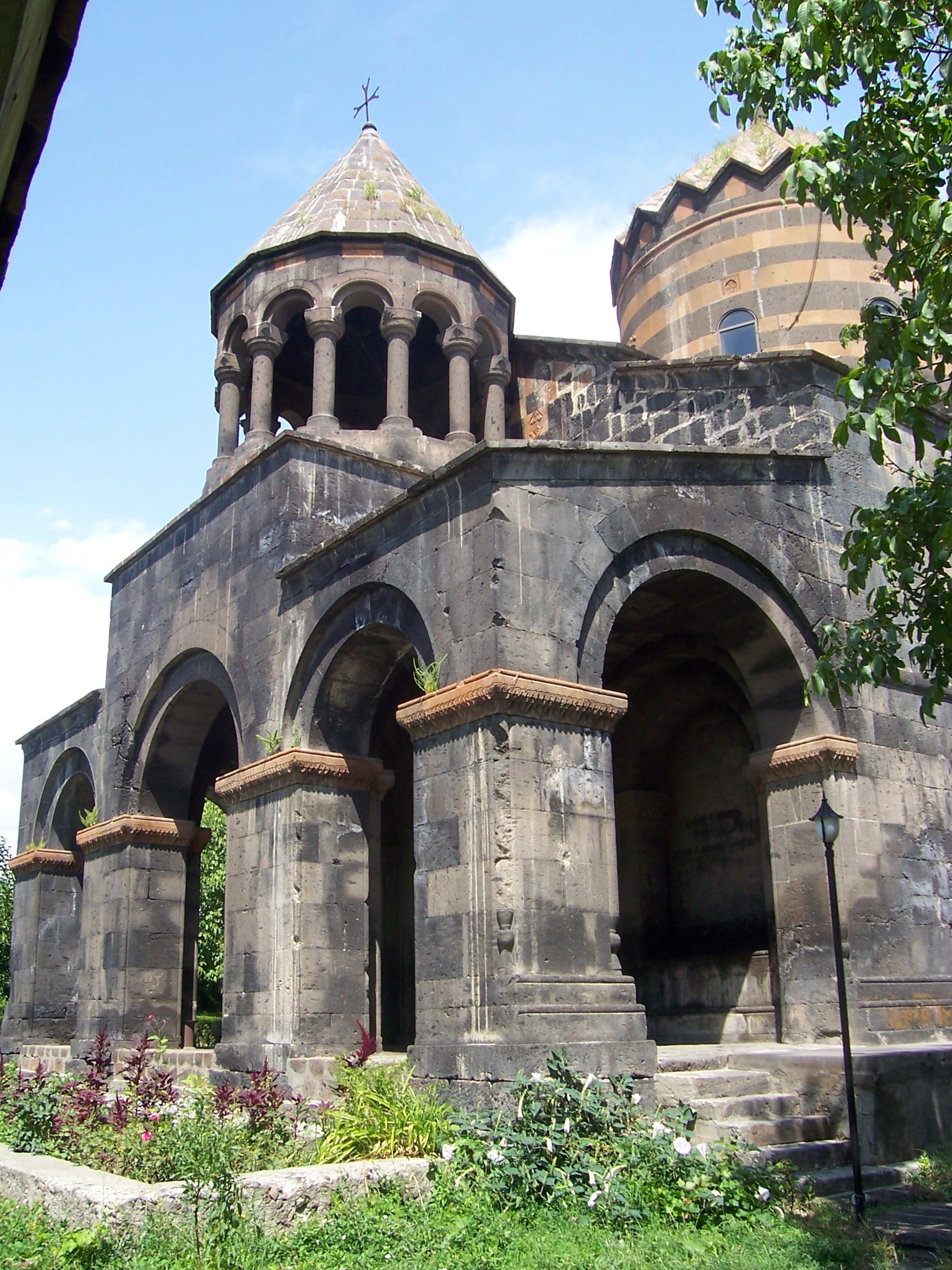
Saint Gevork Monastery, Mughni, 14th century

=== Chapels ===
- Tukh Manuk Shrine, Oshakan, 12-13th centuries
- Tukh Manuk Chapel, Mastara, 13th century
- Saint Gregory Chapel, Oshakan, 13th century
- Saint Thaddeus Chapel, Oshakan, 13th century
- Kiraknamut Chapel, Antarut, 13th century
- Saint Gregory Chapel, Mastara, 17th century
- Surp Narek Chapel, Chknagh, 1830s, rebuilt in 2003
- Chapel of Virgin Sandukht, Talin, 19th century
- Surp Minas Chapel, Mastara, 19th century
- Chapel of Saints Mary and Elisabeth, Arayi, 2002
- Holy Mother of God Chapel, Yernjatap, 2007
- Holy Mother of God Chapel, Agarak, 2008
- Holy Trinity Altar of Hope, Aparan, 2012
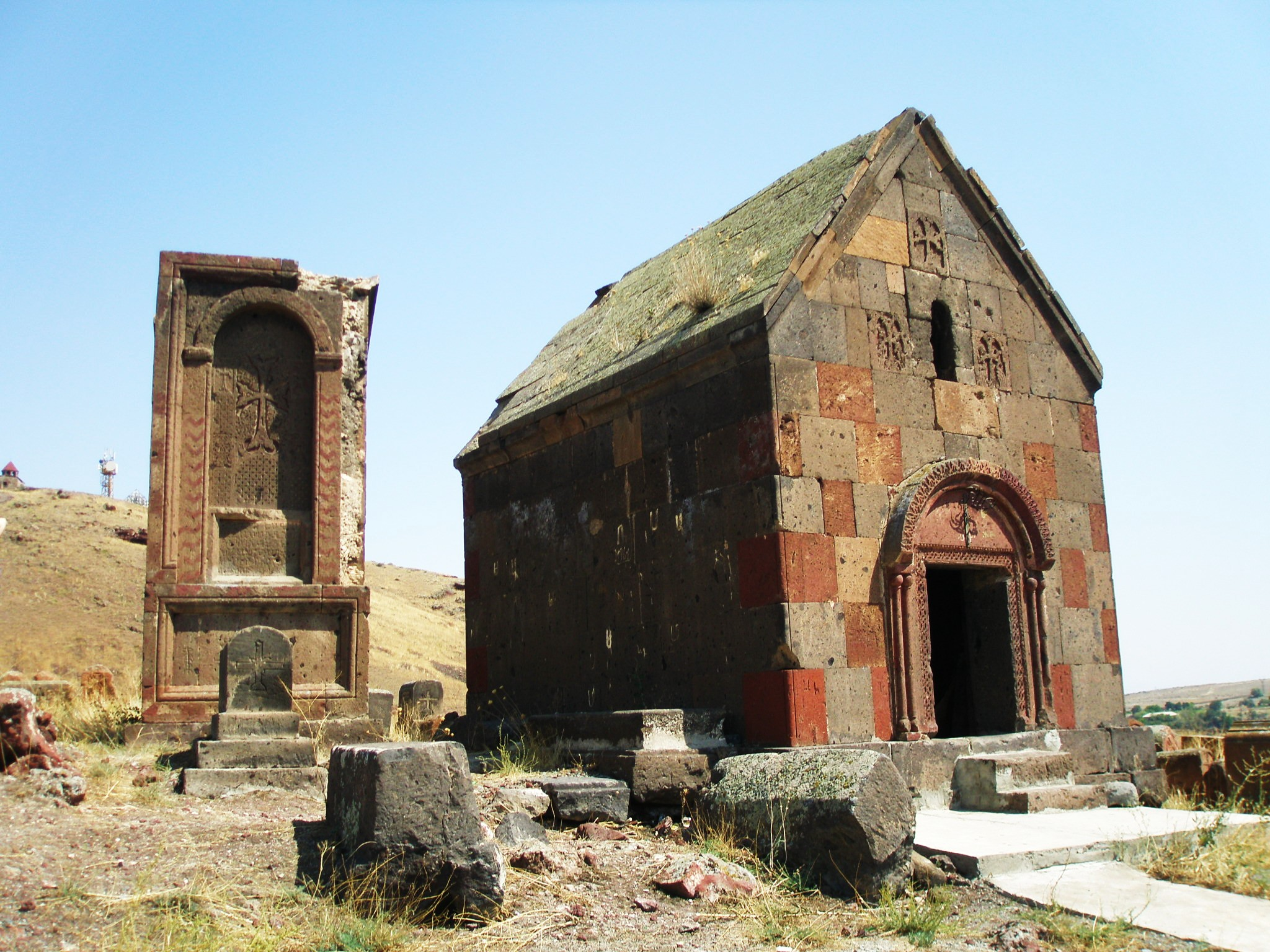
Tukh Manuk Shrine, Oshakan, 12-13th centuries

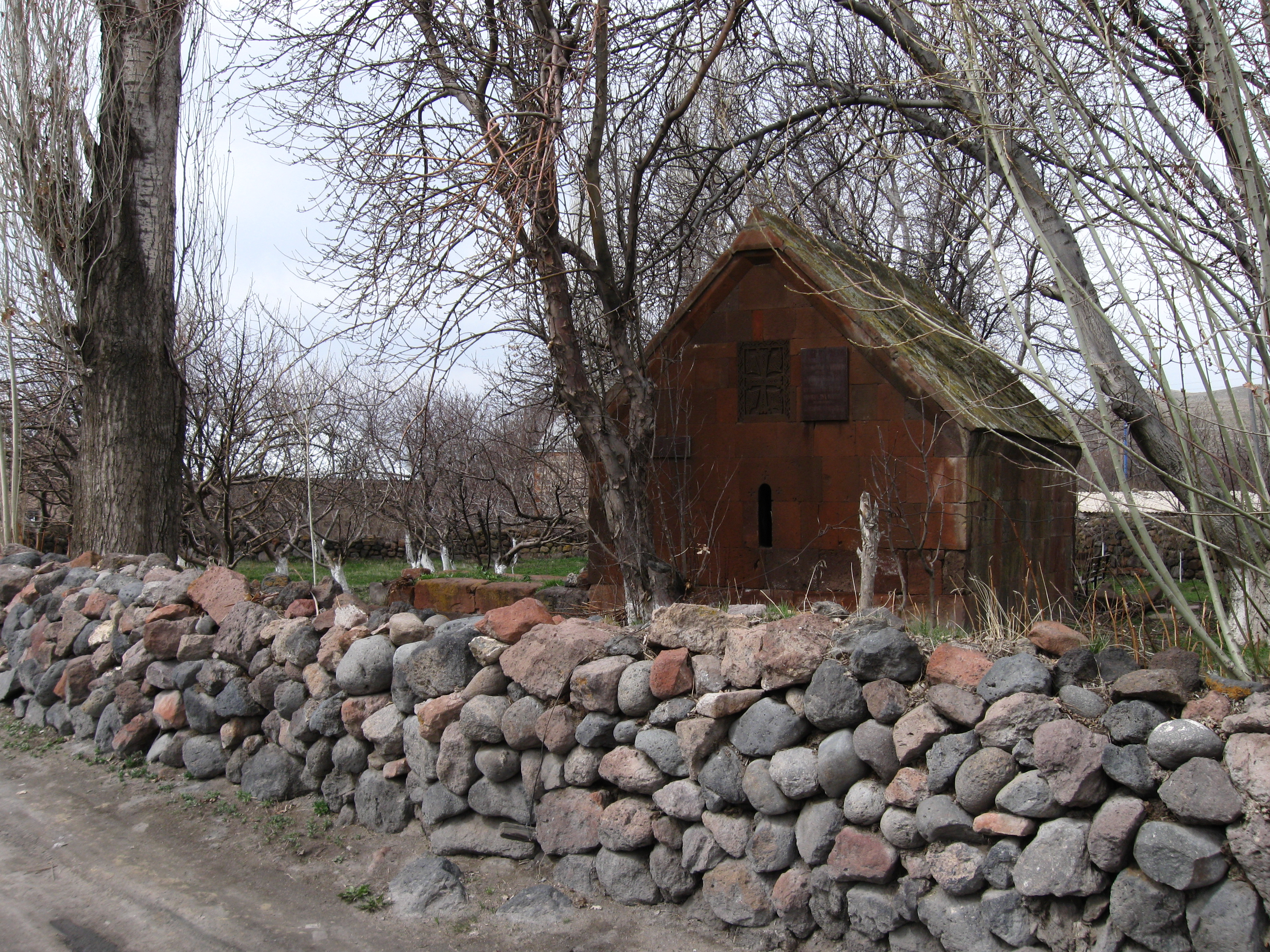
Tukh Manuk Chapel, Mastara, 13th century

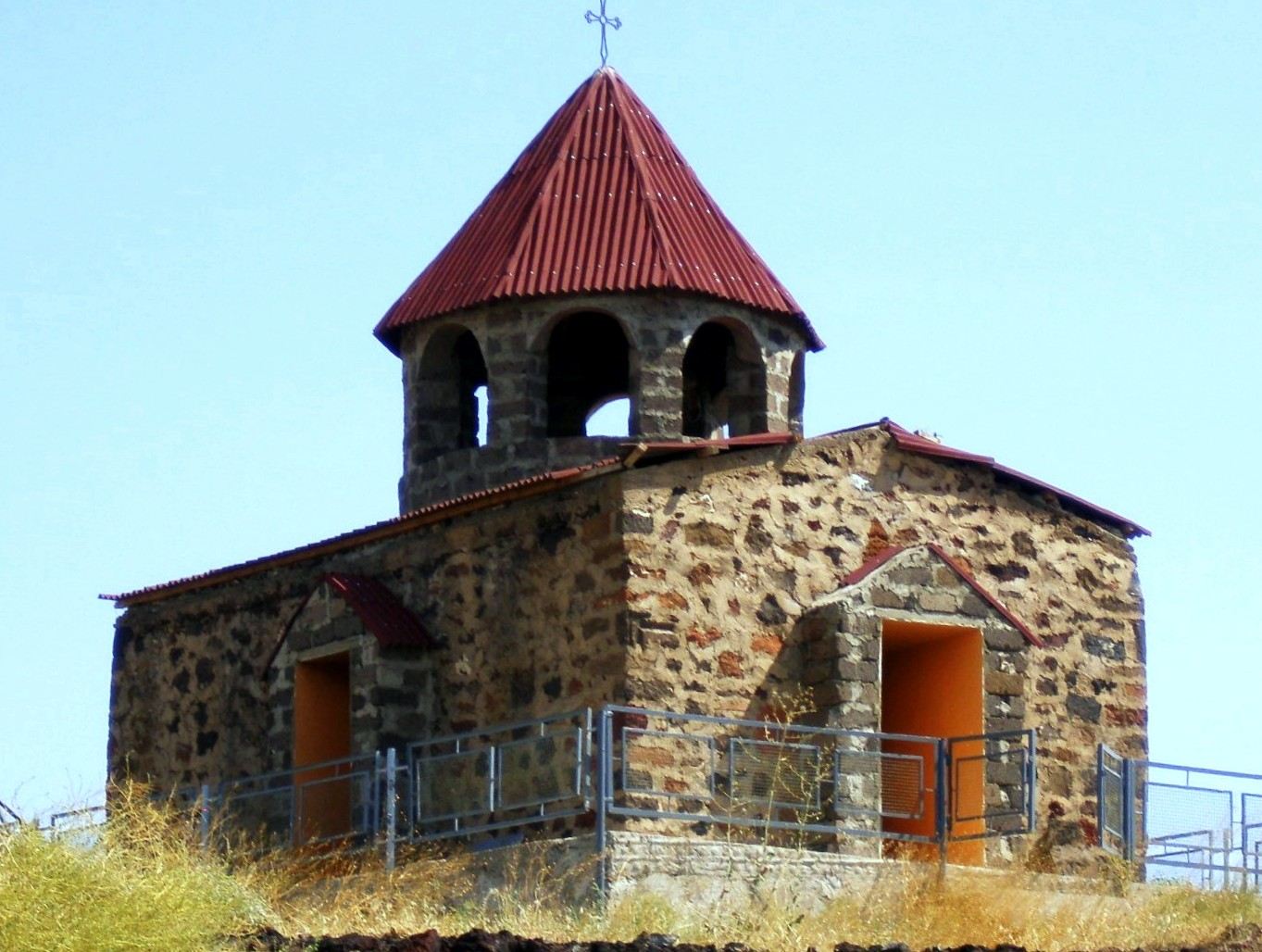
Saint Gregory Chapel, Oshakan, 13th century

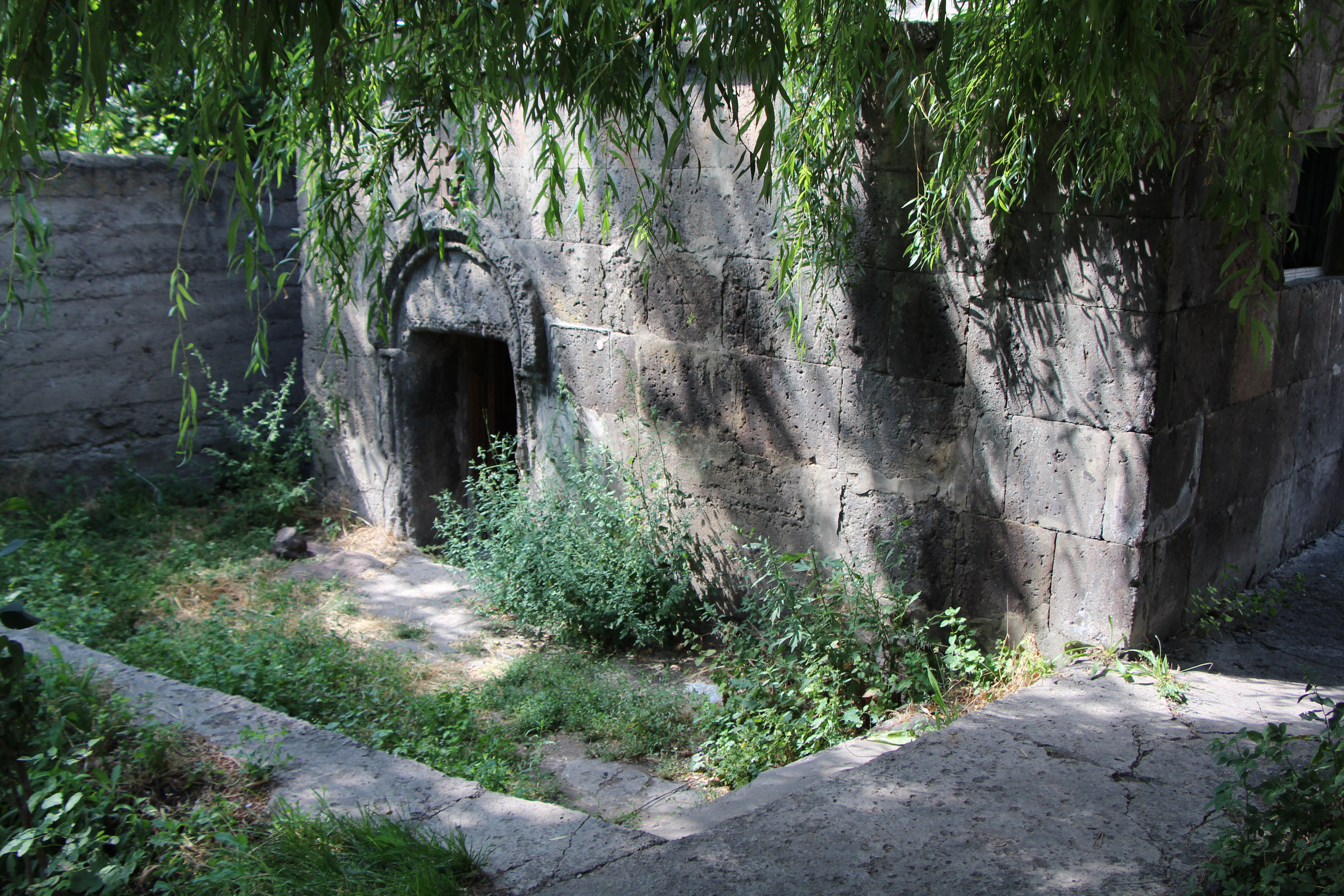
Saint Thaddeus Chapel, Oshakan, 13th century

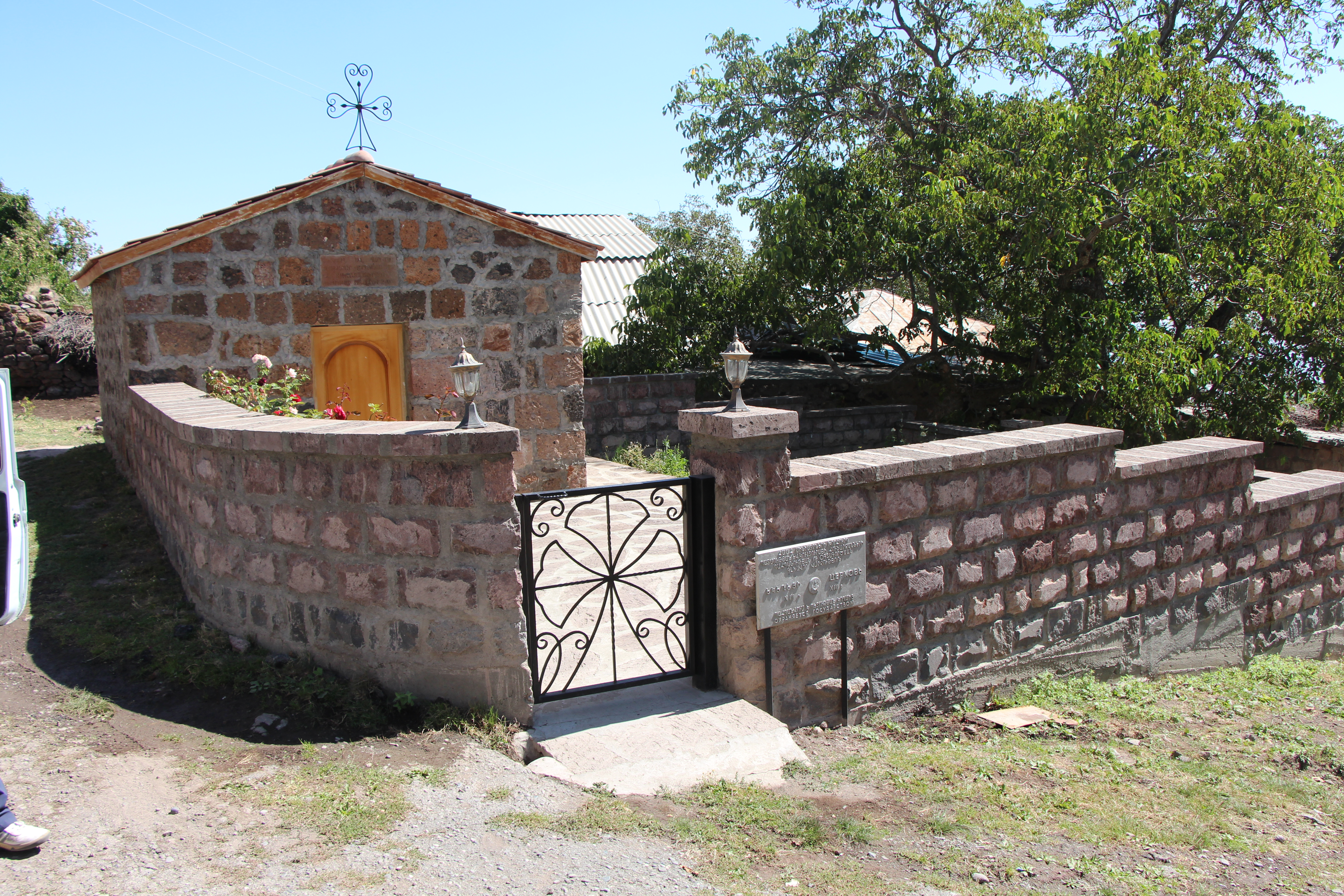
Kiraknamut Chapel, Antarut, 13th century

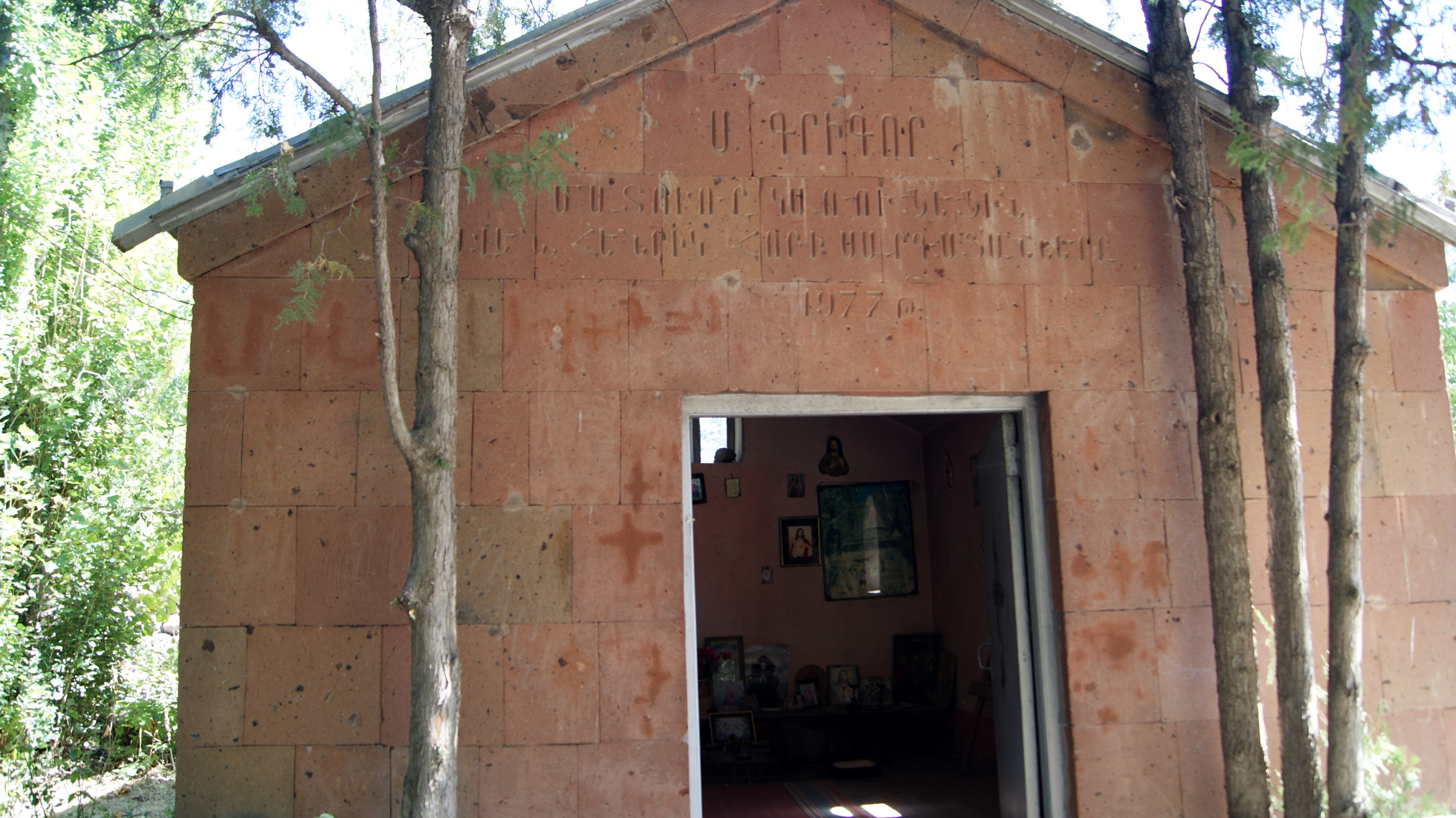
Saint Gregory Chapel, Mastara, 17th century

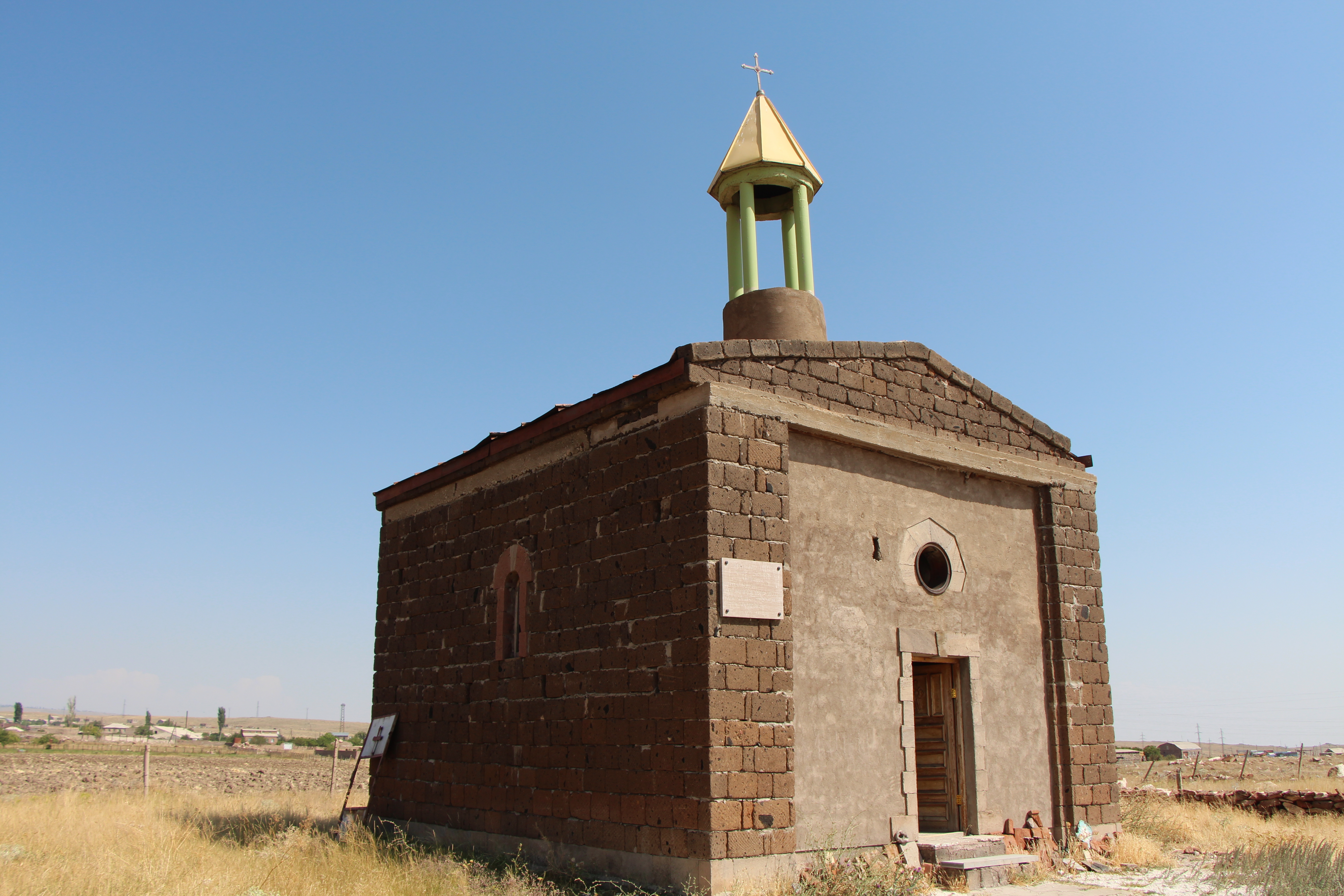
Chapel of Virgin Sandukht, Talin, 19th century

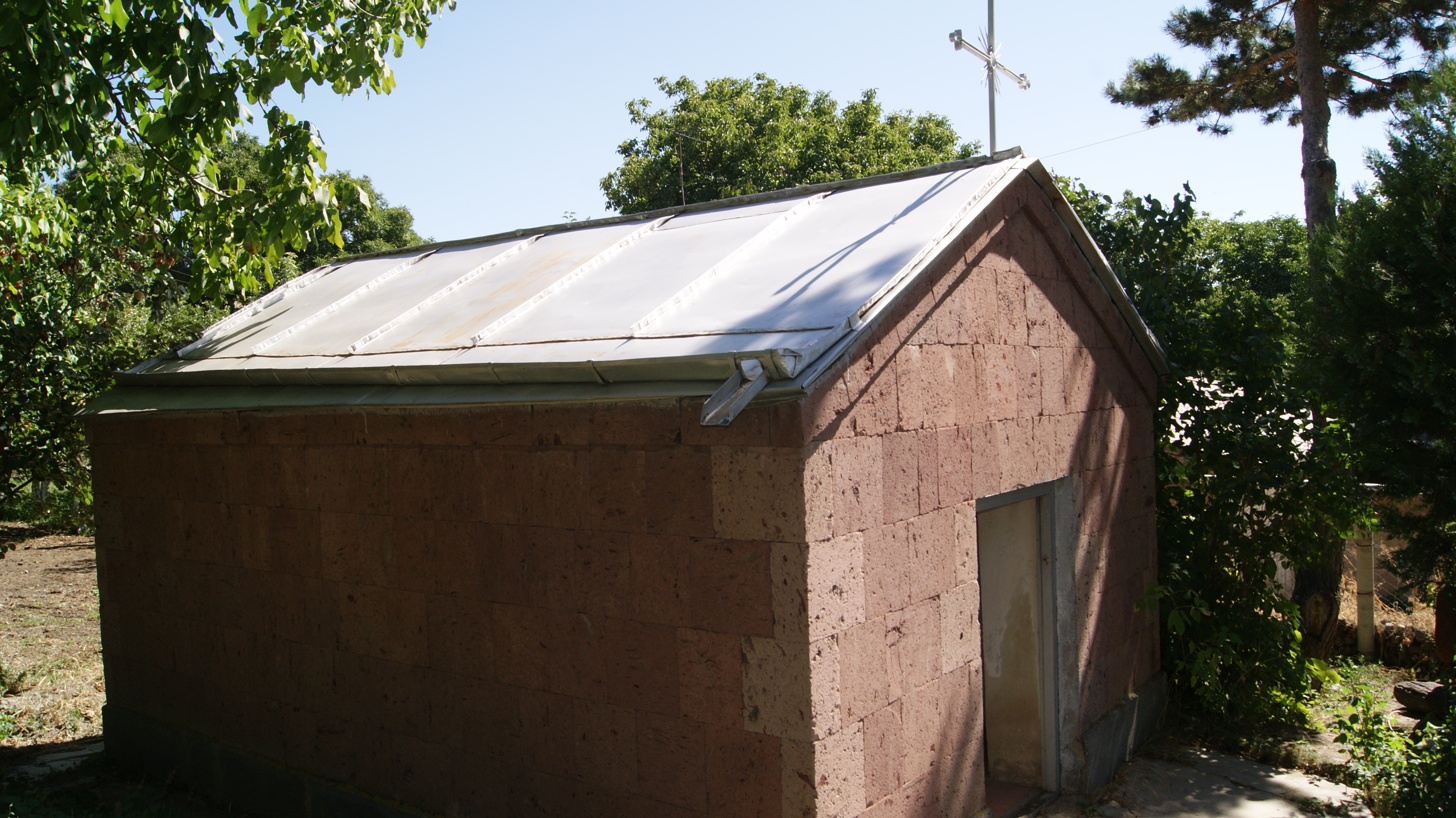
Surp Minas Chapel, Mastara, 19th century

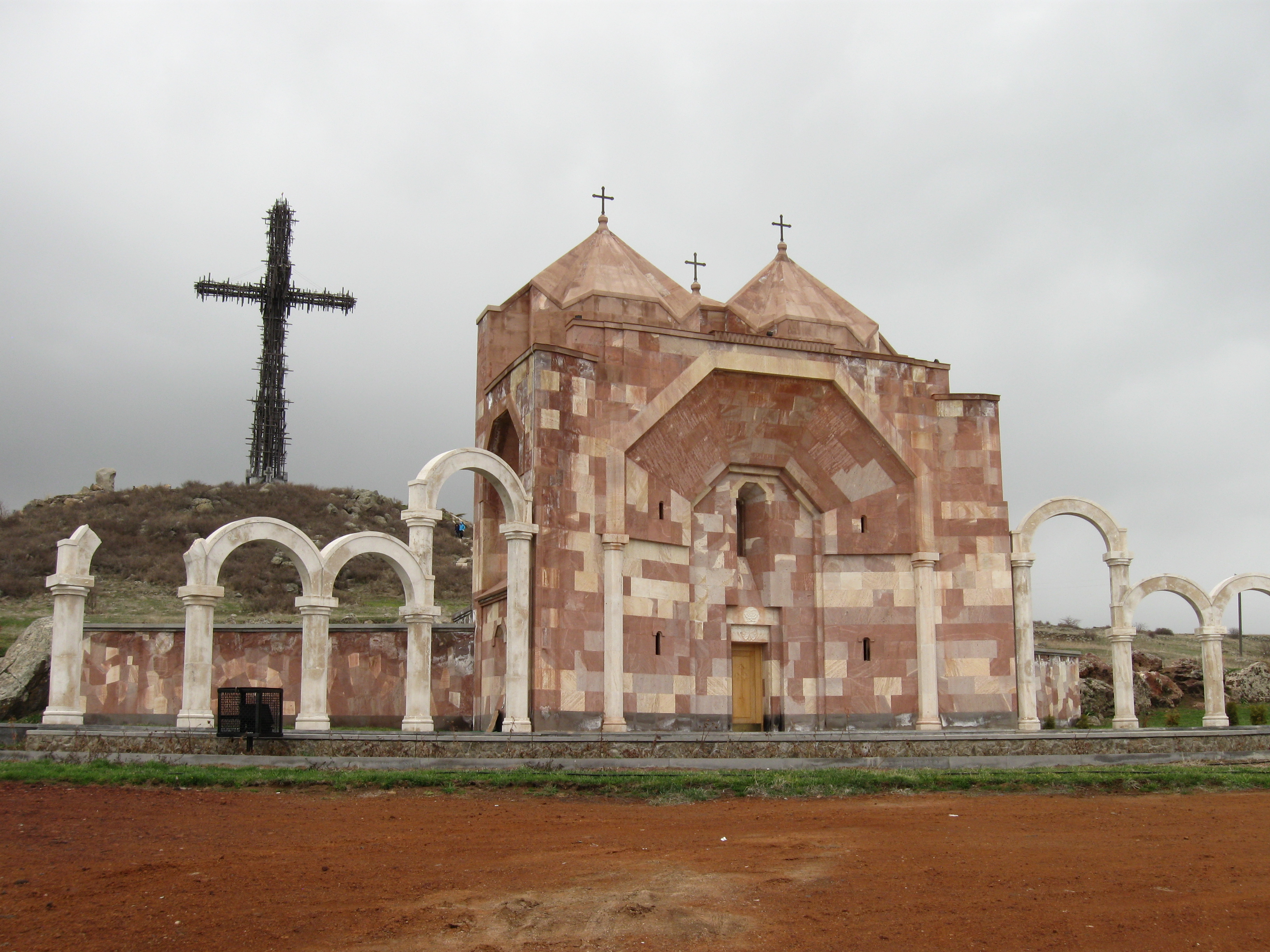
Holy Trinity Altar of Hope, Aparan, 2012

== Inactive/ruined churches and monasteries ==
This is an incomplete list of inactive or ruined churches and monasteries in the territory regulated by the Diocese of Aragatsotn:

- Saints Paul and Peter Church, Zovuni near Jrambar, 4th-5th centuries
- Astvatsenkal Monastery near Hartavan, 4th-5th centuries,
- Lusagyugh Red Monastery, Lusagyugh, 5th century
- Surp Stepanos Church, Chknagh, 5th century
- Holy Saviour's Church of Shenik, Mastara, 5th century
- Tsiranavor Church, Ashtarak, 5th century
- Tsiranavor Church, Parpi, 5th century
- Arshakuni Church of Aghdzk, Aghdzk, 5th century
- Holy Mother of God Church of Shenik, Mastara, 6th century
- Aruchavank Monastery, Aruch, 660s
- Cathedral of Talin, Talin, 7th century
- Saint George's Church, Garnahovit, 7th century
- Targmanchats Church, Parpi, 7th century
- Church of Kamsarakan Surp Astvatsatsin, Talin, 7th century
- Saint Christopher Monastery, Dashtadem, 7th century
- Artavazik Church, Byurakan, 7th century
- Surp Hovhannes Church, Voskevaz, 7th century
- Saint Sarkis Monastery, Ushi, 7th century
- Tukh Manuk Chapel, Lusagyugh, 7th century
- Saint Zion Church, Oshakan, 7th century
- Surp Astvatsatsin Basilica, Verin Sasunik, 7th century
- Yeghipatrush Church of the Holy Mother of God, Yeghipatrush, 10th century
- Vahramashen Church of the Holy Mother of God, Byurakan, 1026
- Tukh Manuk Chapel, Kuchak, 12-13th centuries
- Holy Mother of God Church, Yernjatap, 12th-13the centuries
- Spitakavor Church, Ashtarak, 13th century
- Surp Stepanos Nakhavka Church, Mastara, 17th century
- Berkarat Church, Berkarat, 19th century
- Holy Mother of God Church, Antarut, 19th century
- Saint George's Church, Kosh, 19th century
- Saint George's Church, Kuchak, 1891
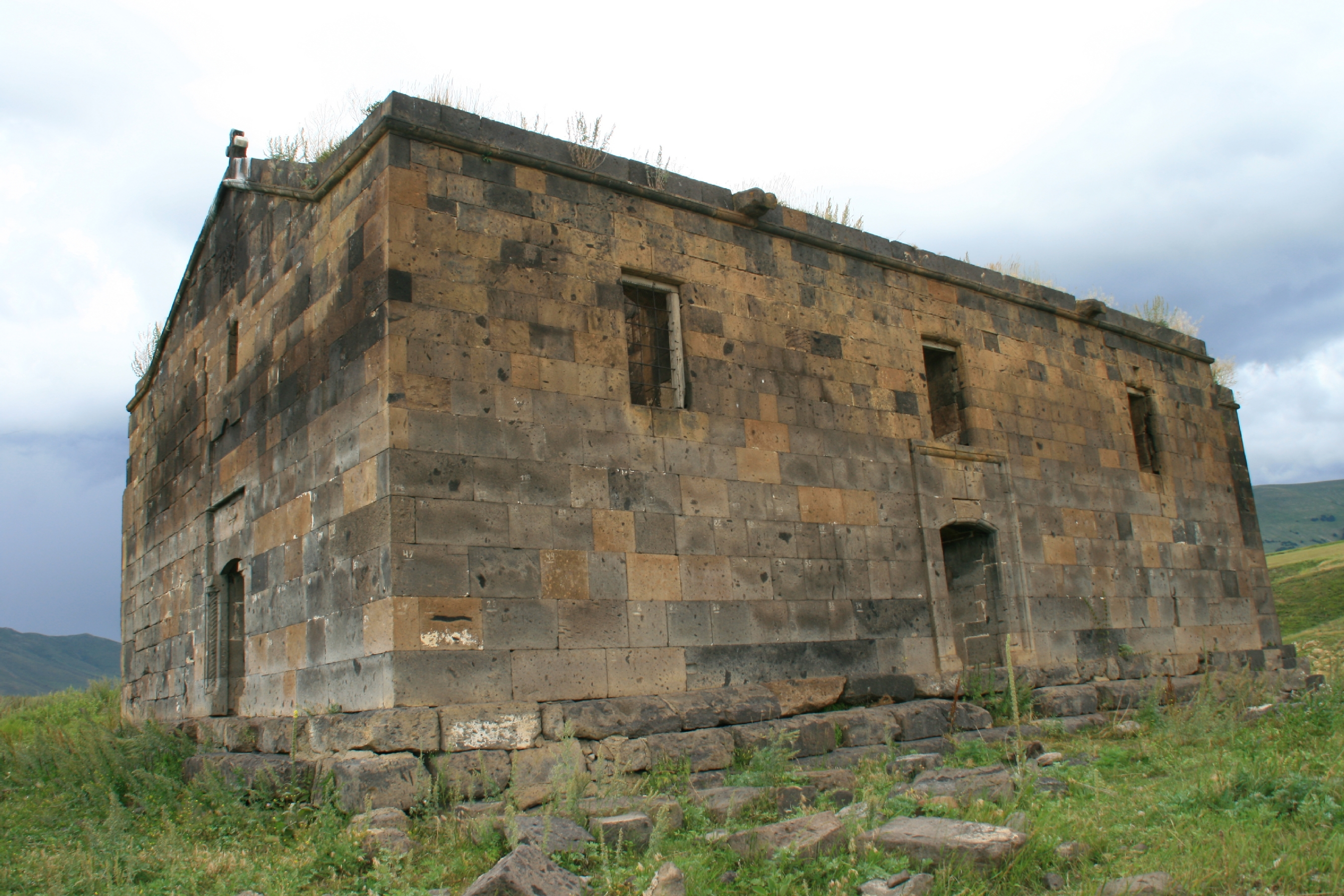
Saints Paul and Peter Church, Zovuni near Jrambar, 4th-5th centuries

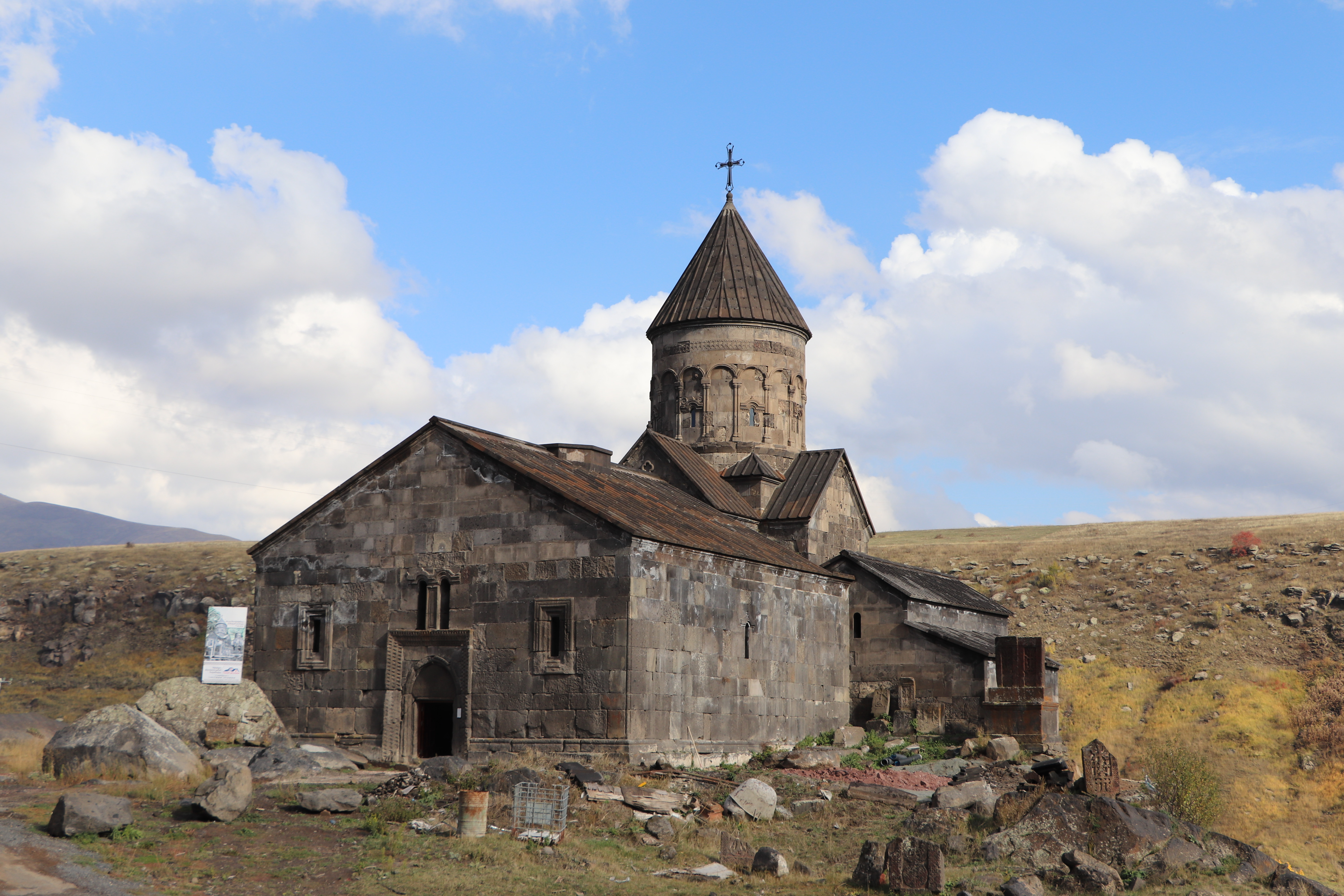
Astvatsenkal Monastery near Hartavan, 4th-5th centuries,

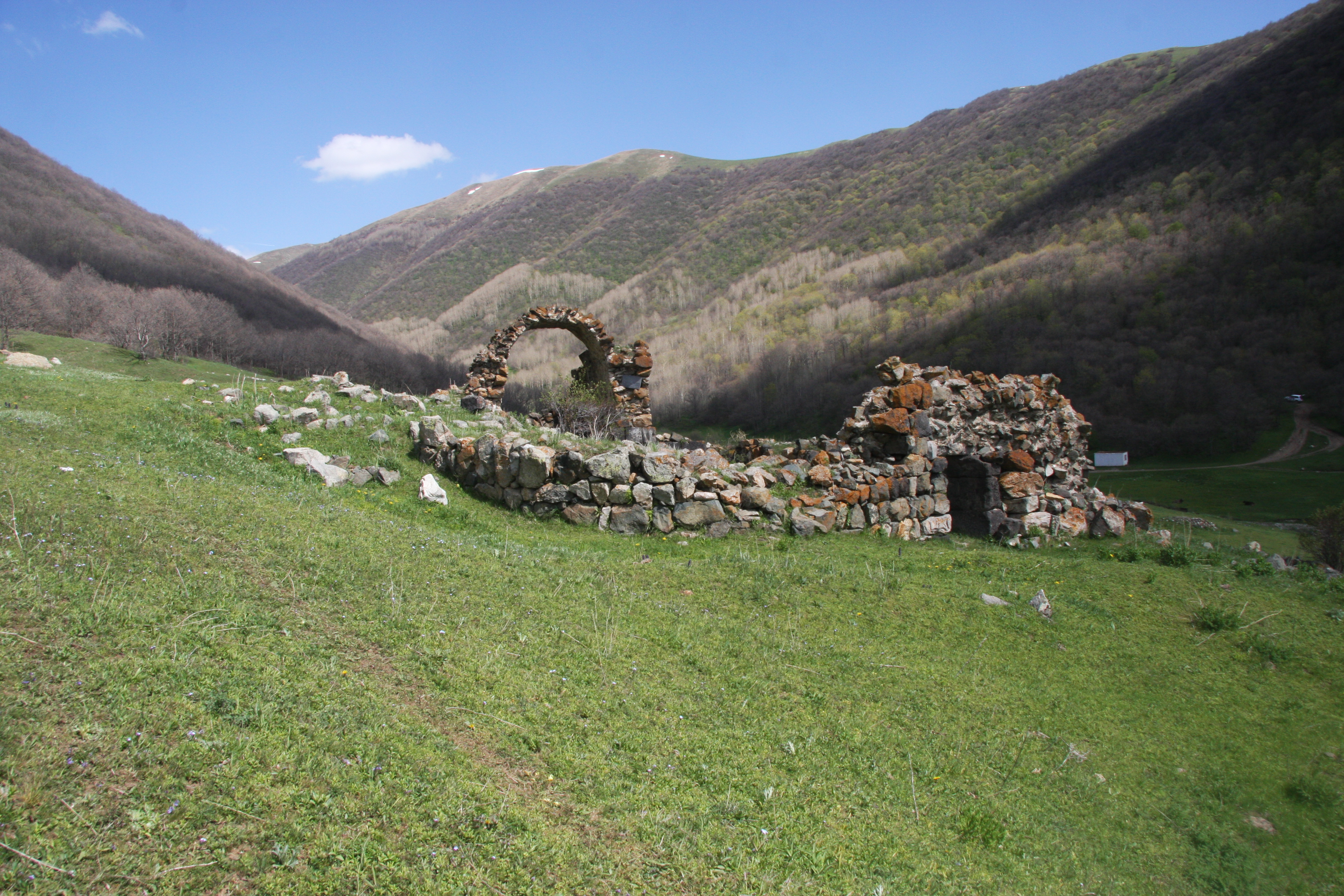
Lusagyugh Red Monastery, Lusagyugh, 5th century

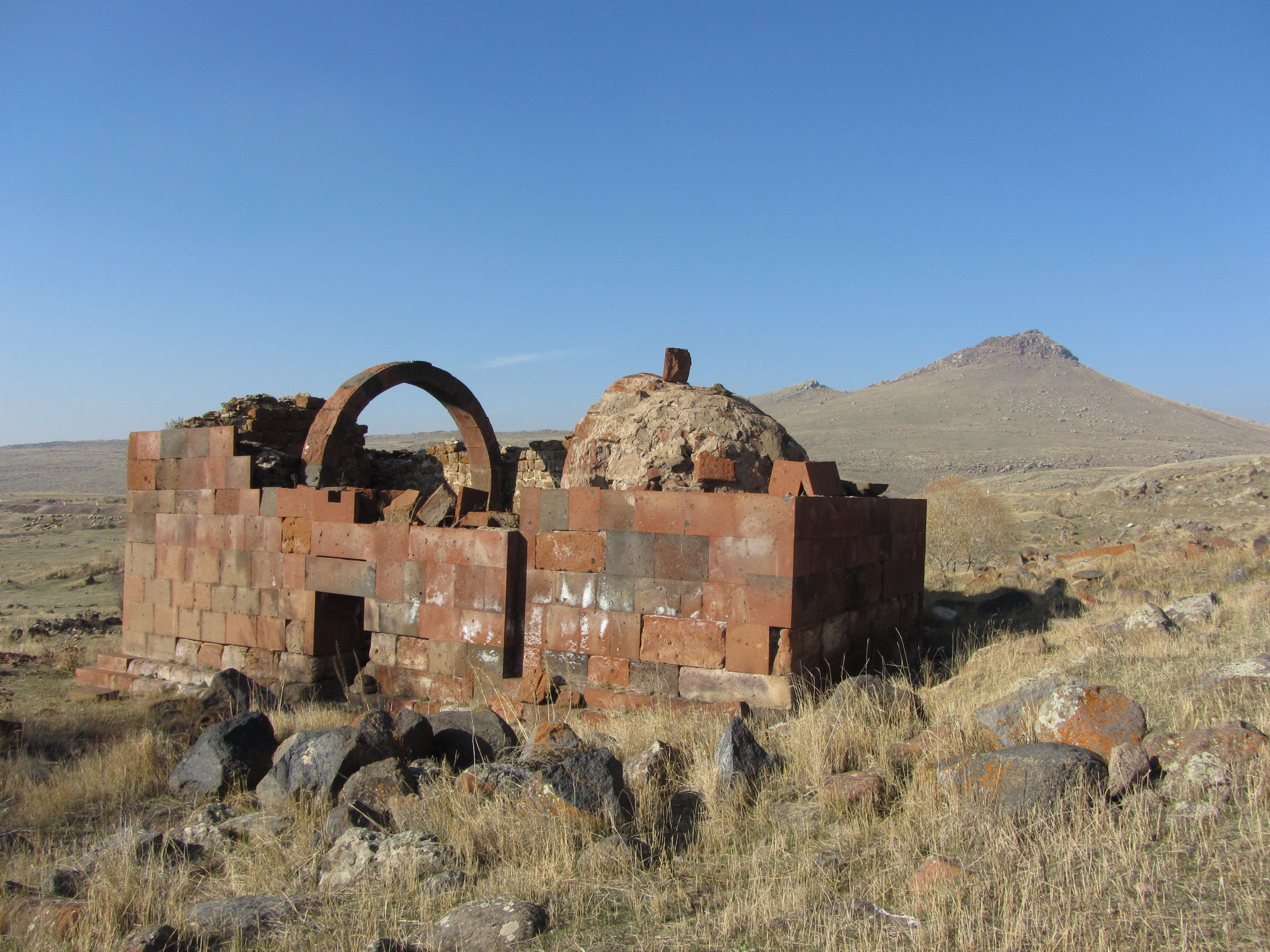
Holy Saviour's Church of Shenik, Mastara, 5th century

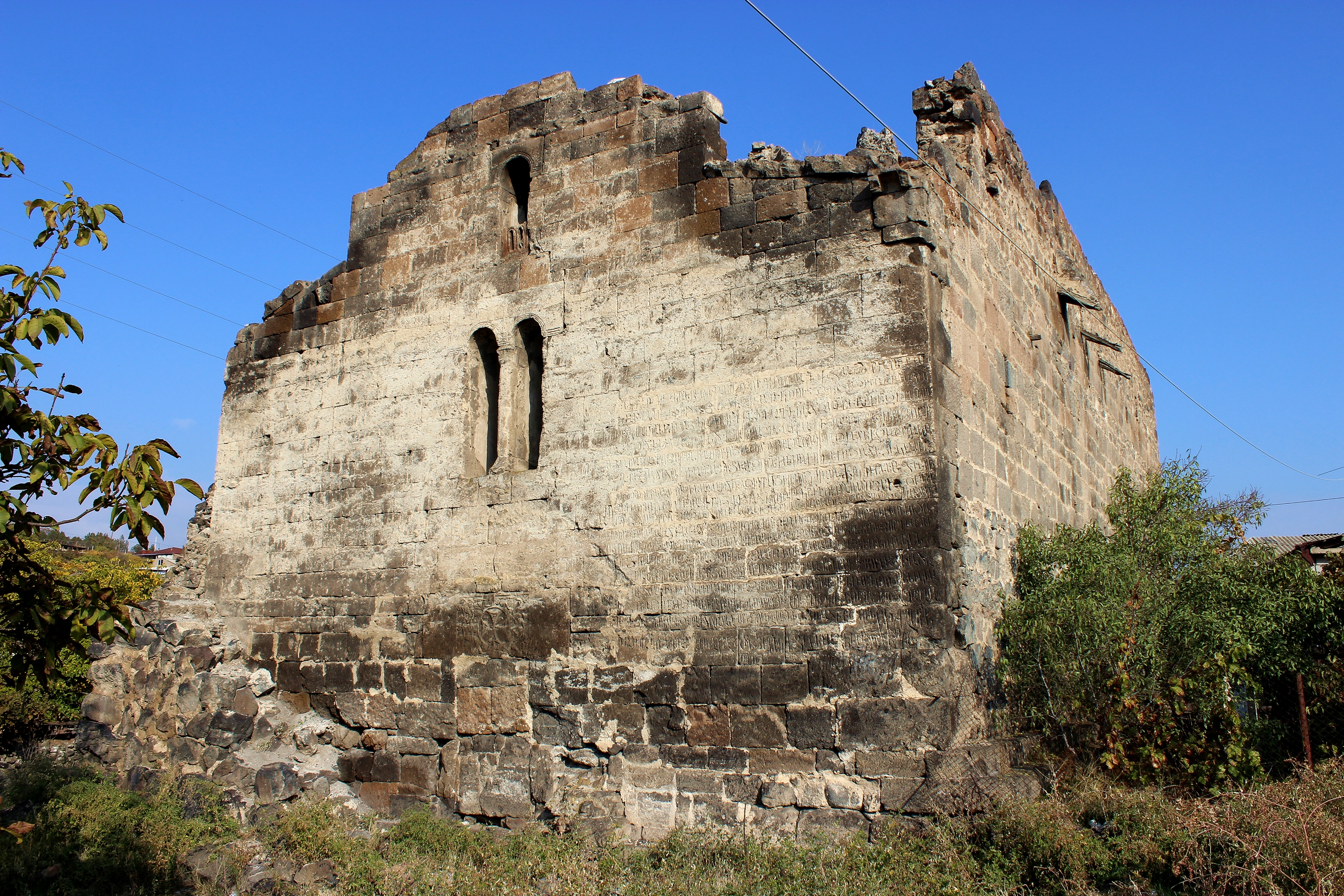
Tsiranavor Church, Ashtarak, 5th century

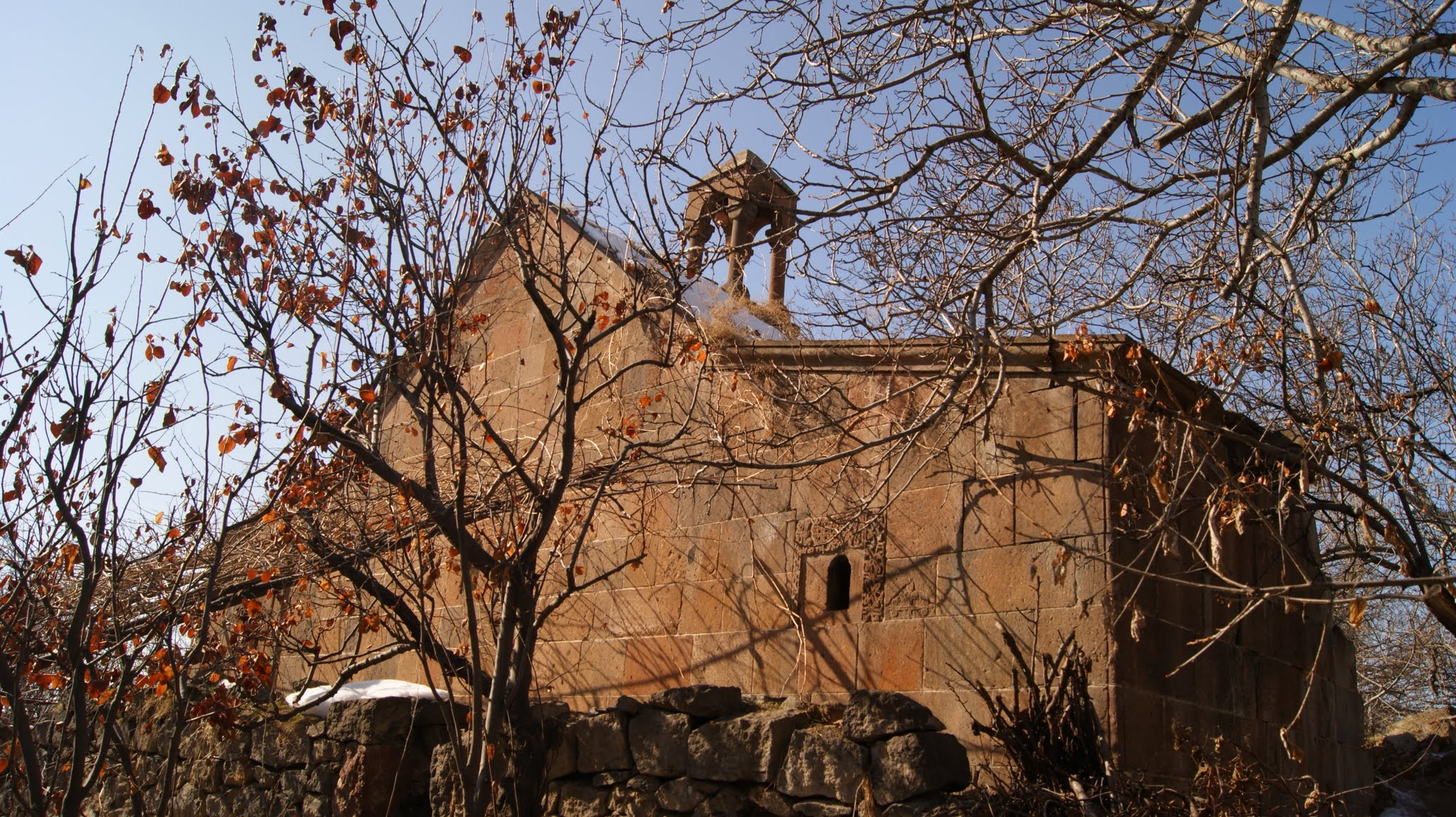
Tsiranavor Church, Parpi, 5th century

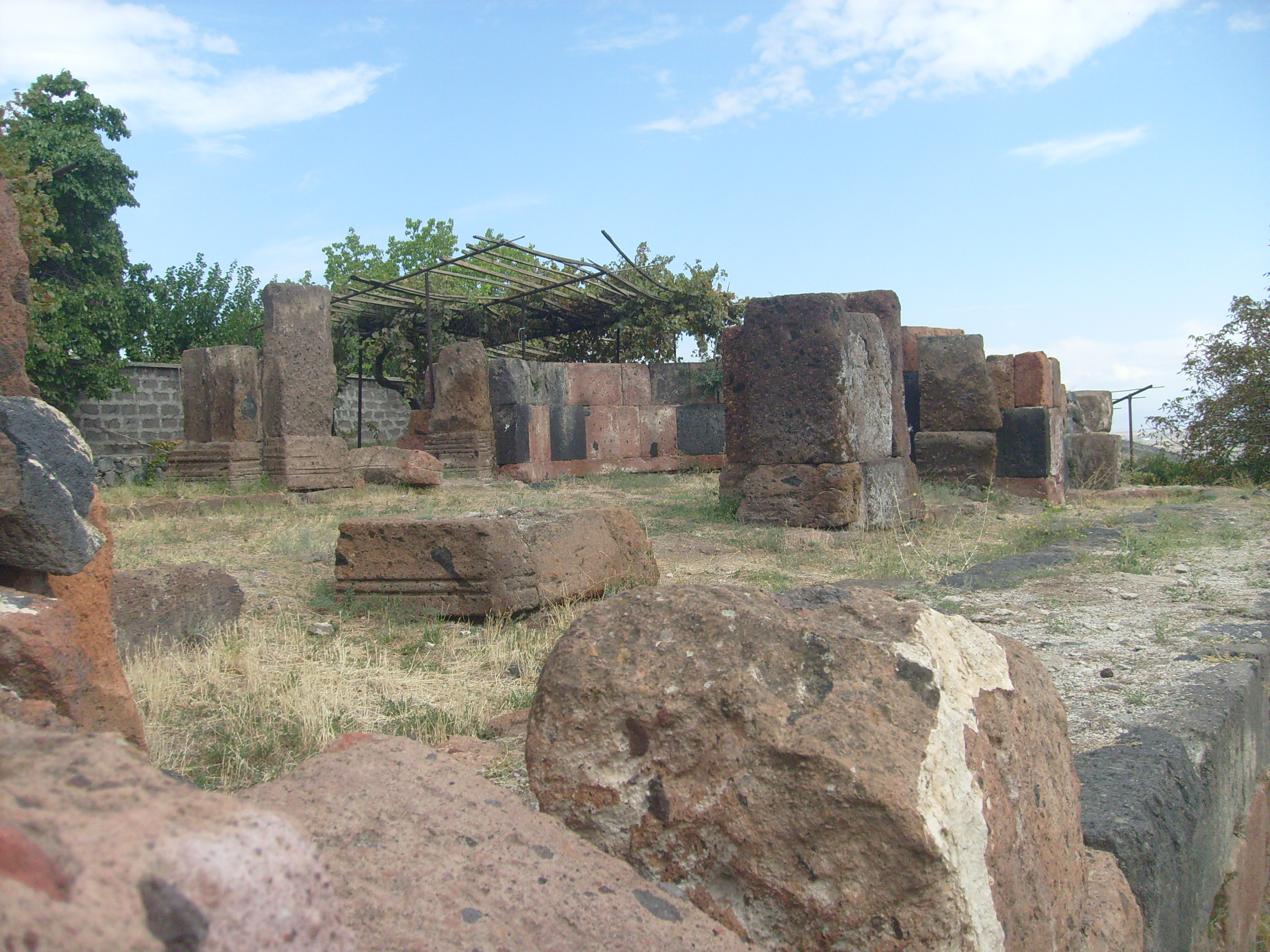
Arshakuni Church of Aghdzk, Aghdzk, 5th century

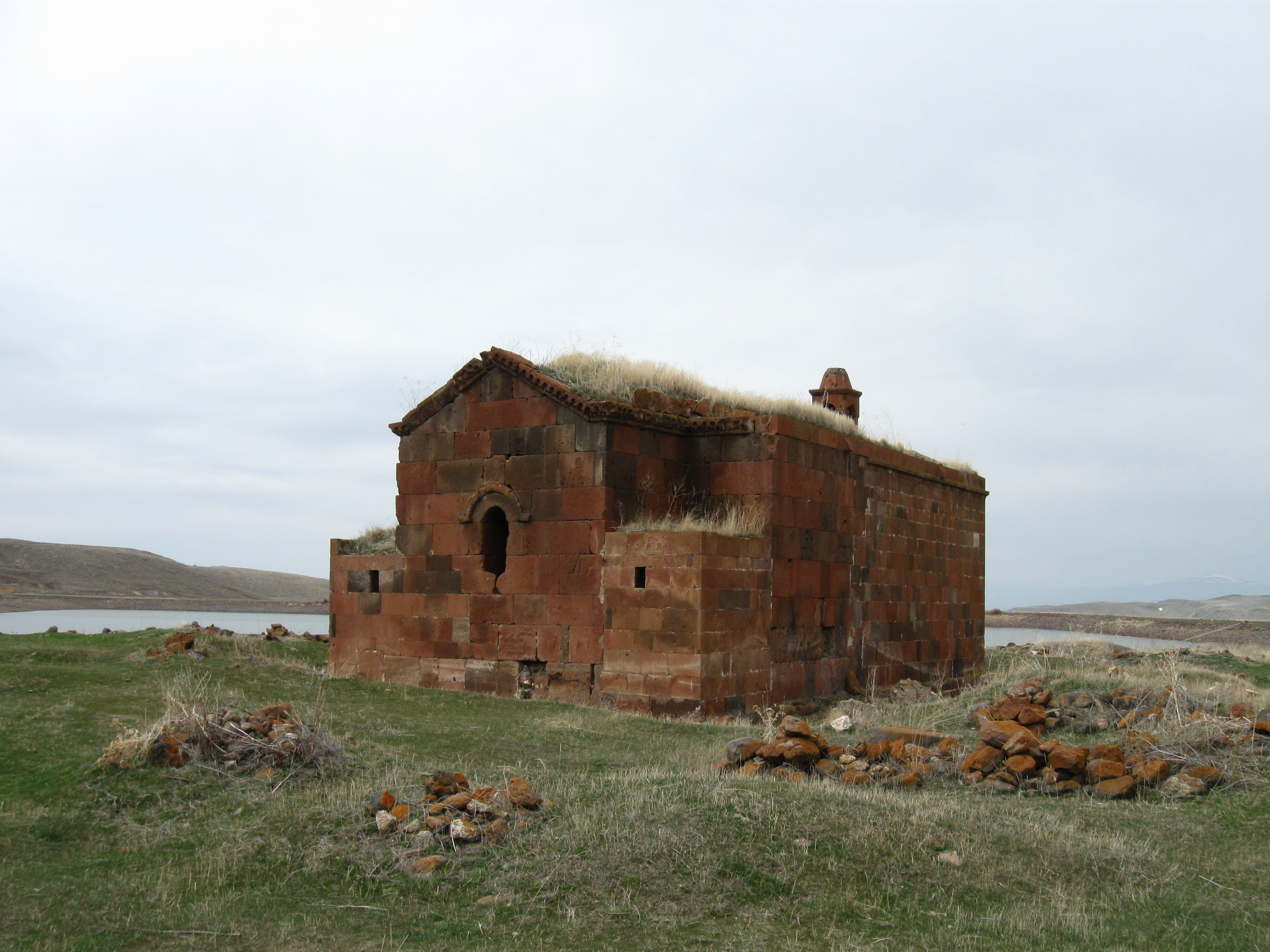
Holy Mother of God Church of Shenik, Mastara, 6th century

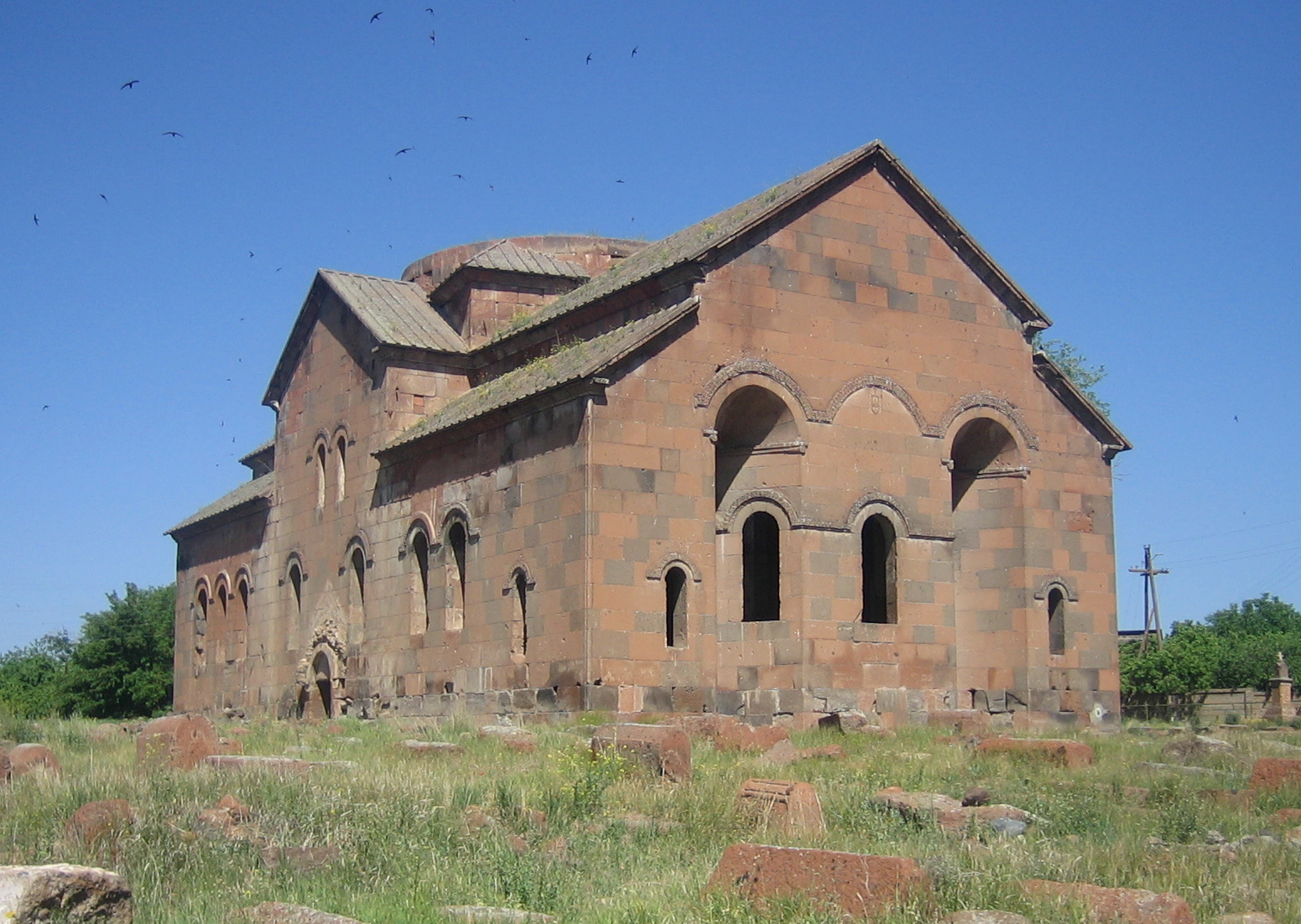
Aruchavank Monastery, Aruch, 660s

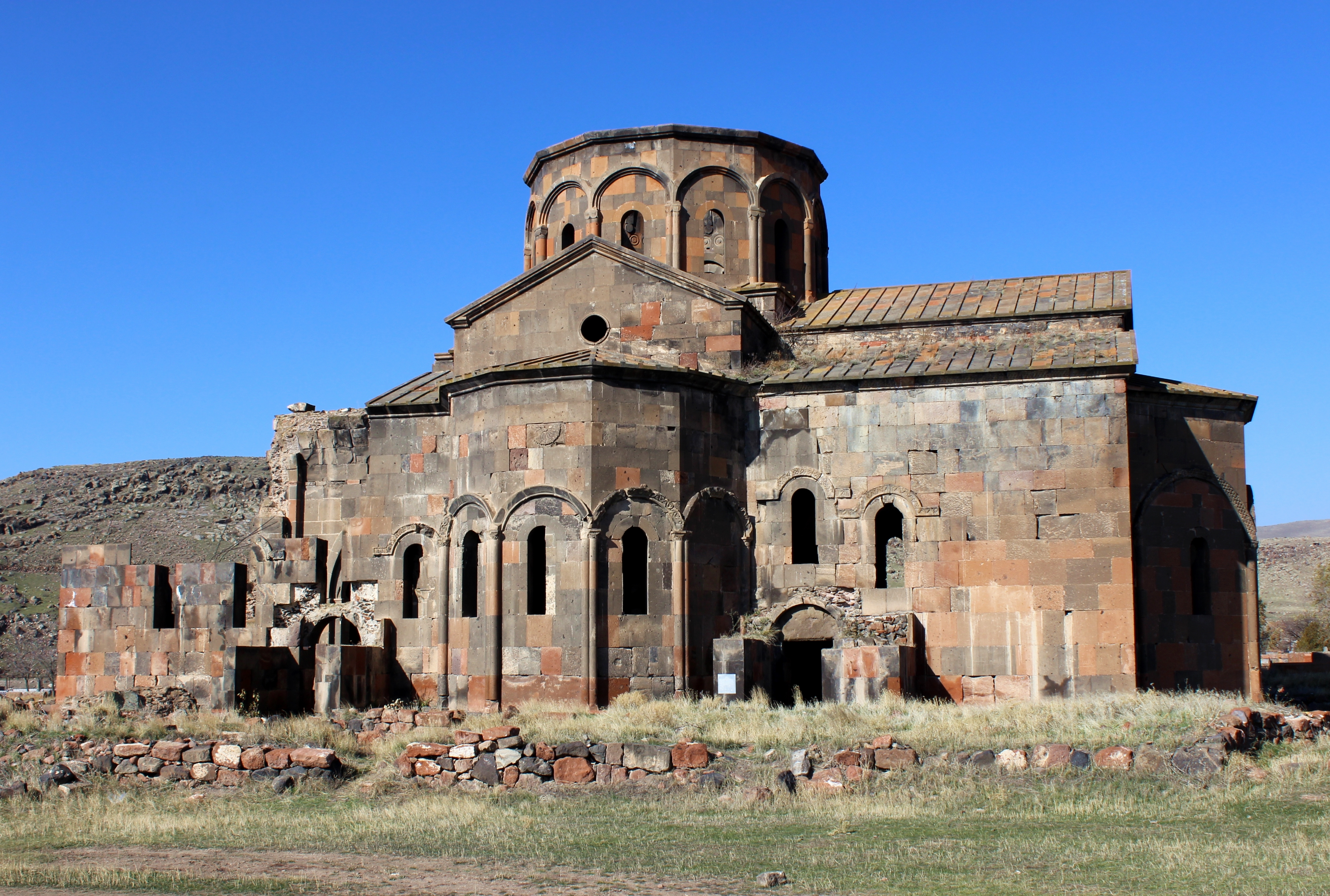
Cathedral of Talin, Talin, 7th century

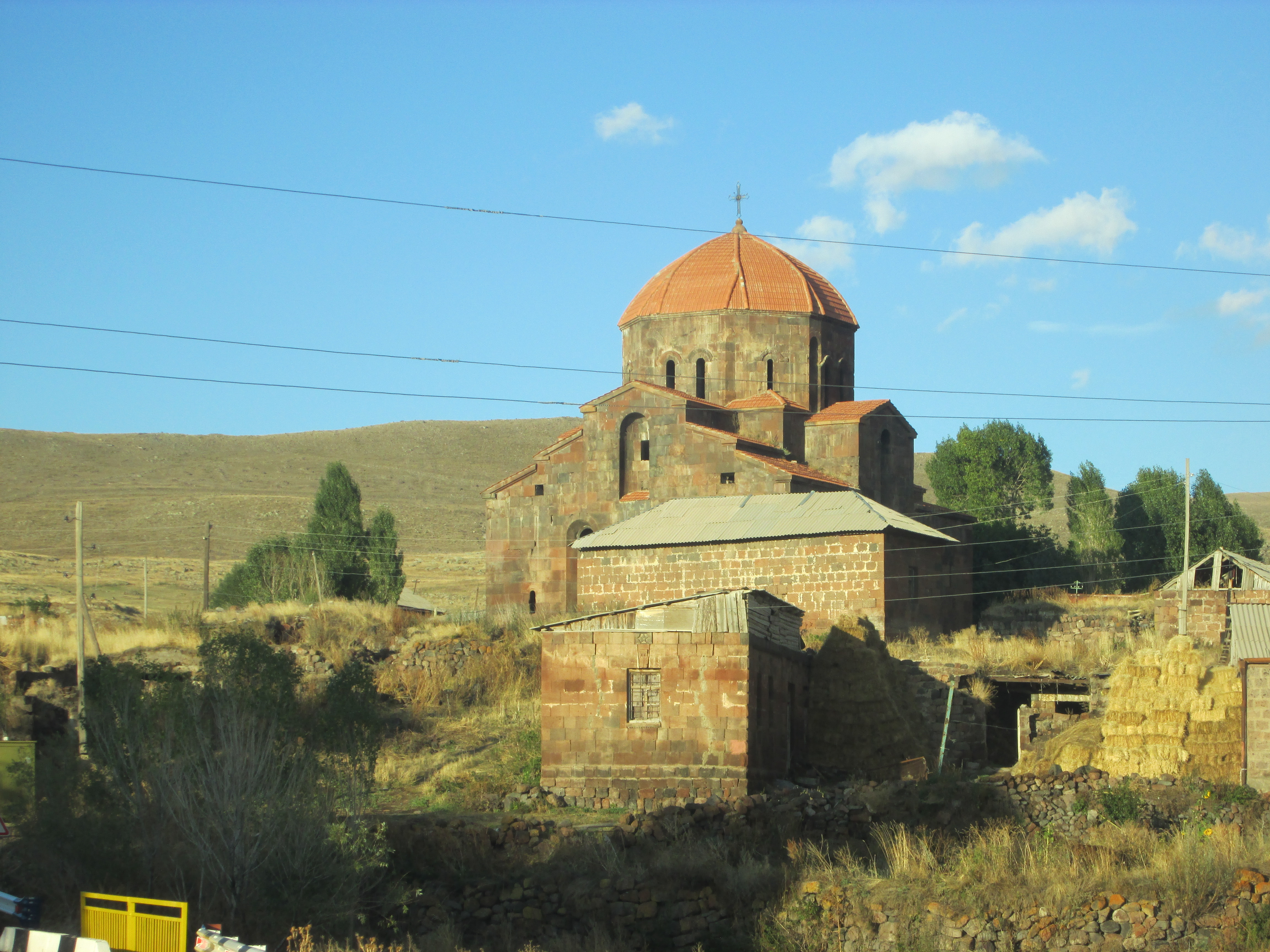
Saint George's Church, Garnahovit, 7th century

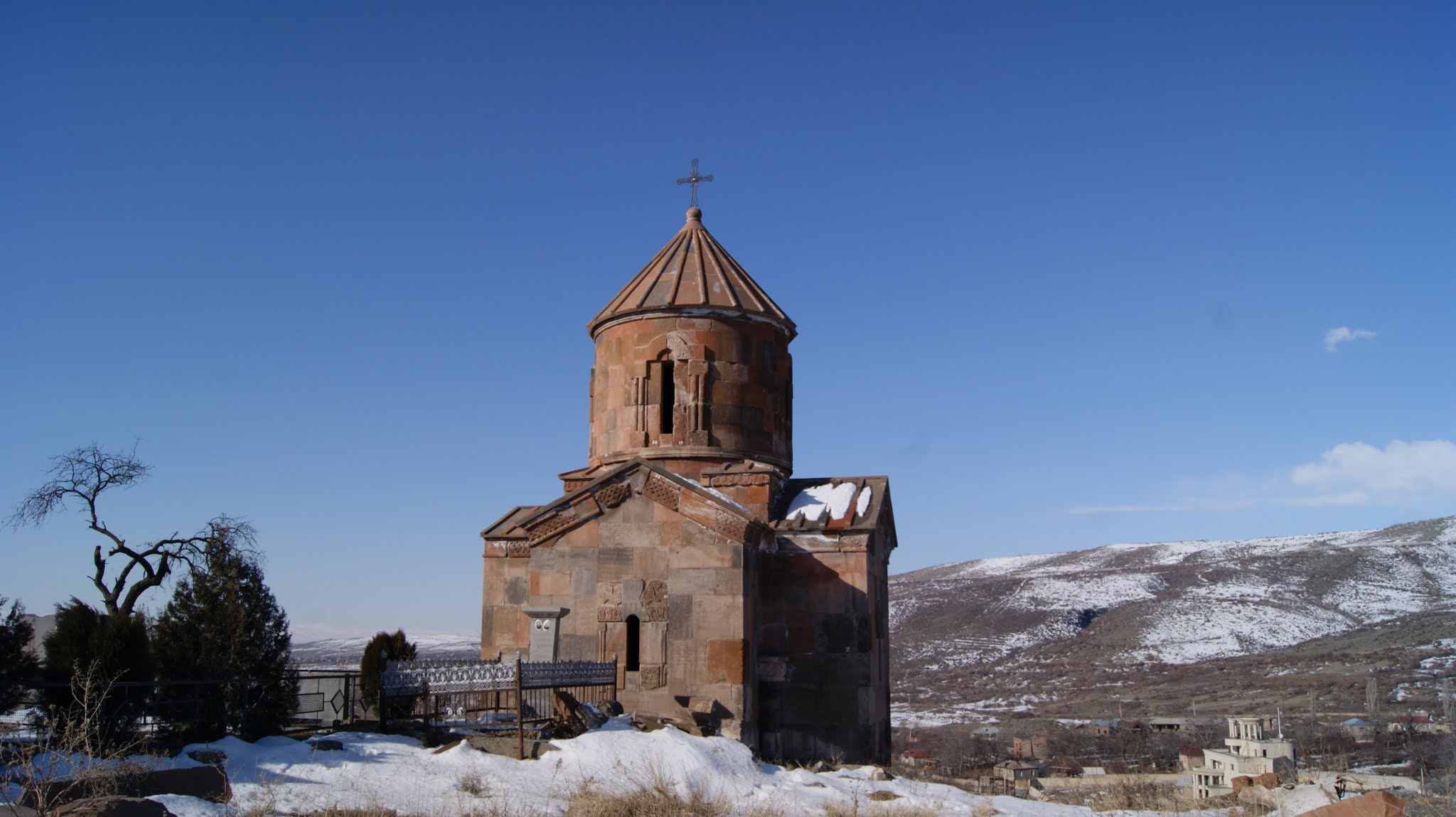
Targmanchats Church, Parpi, 7th century

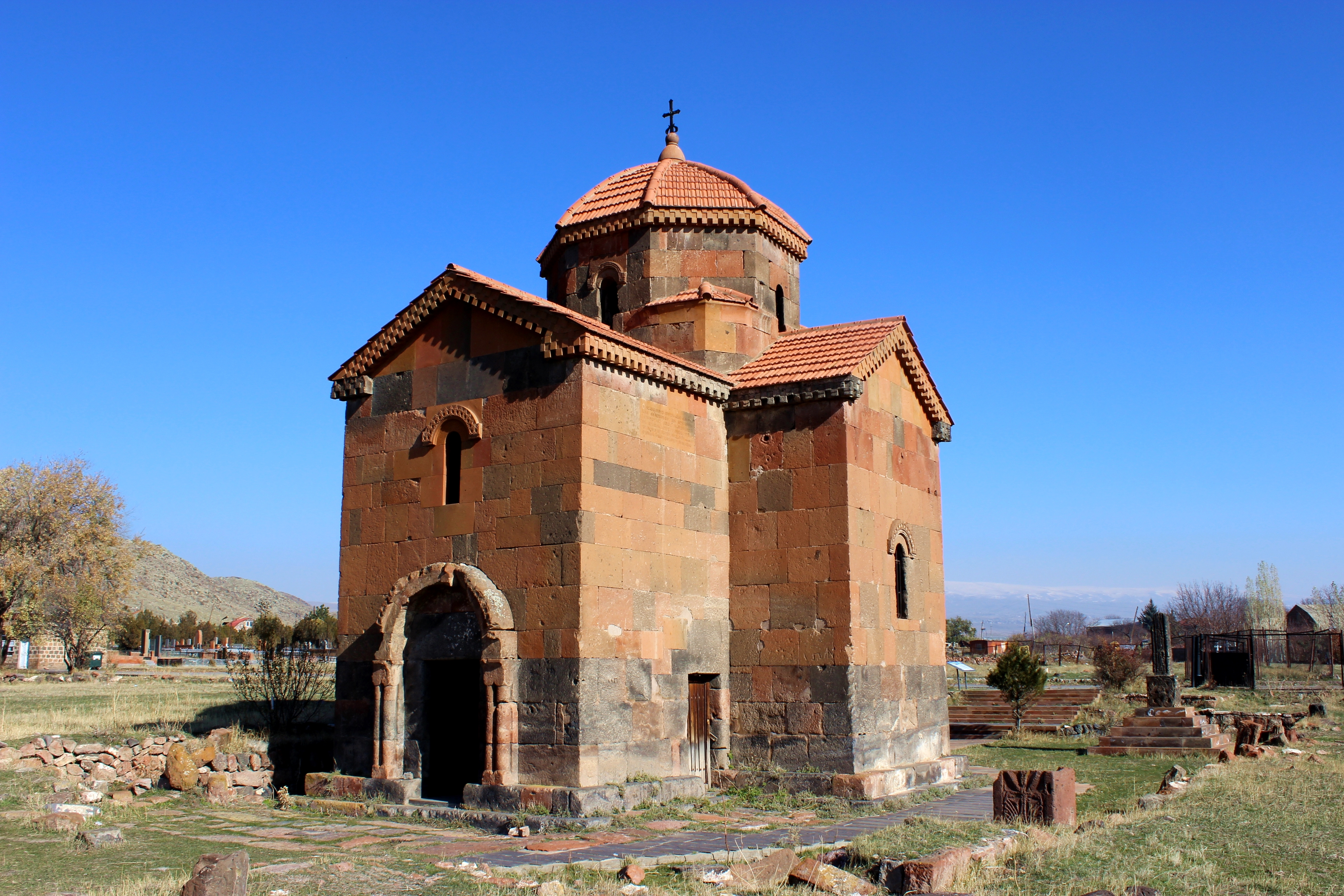
Church of Kamsarakan Surp Astvatsatsin, Talin, 7th century

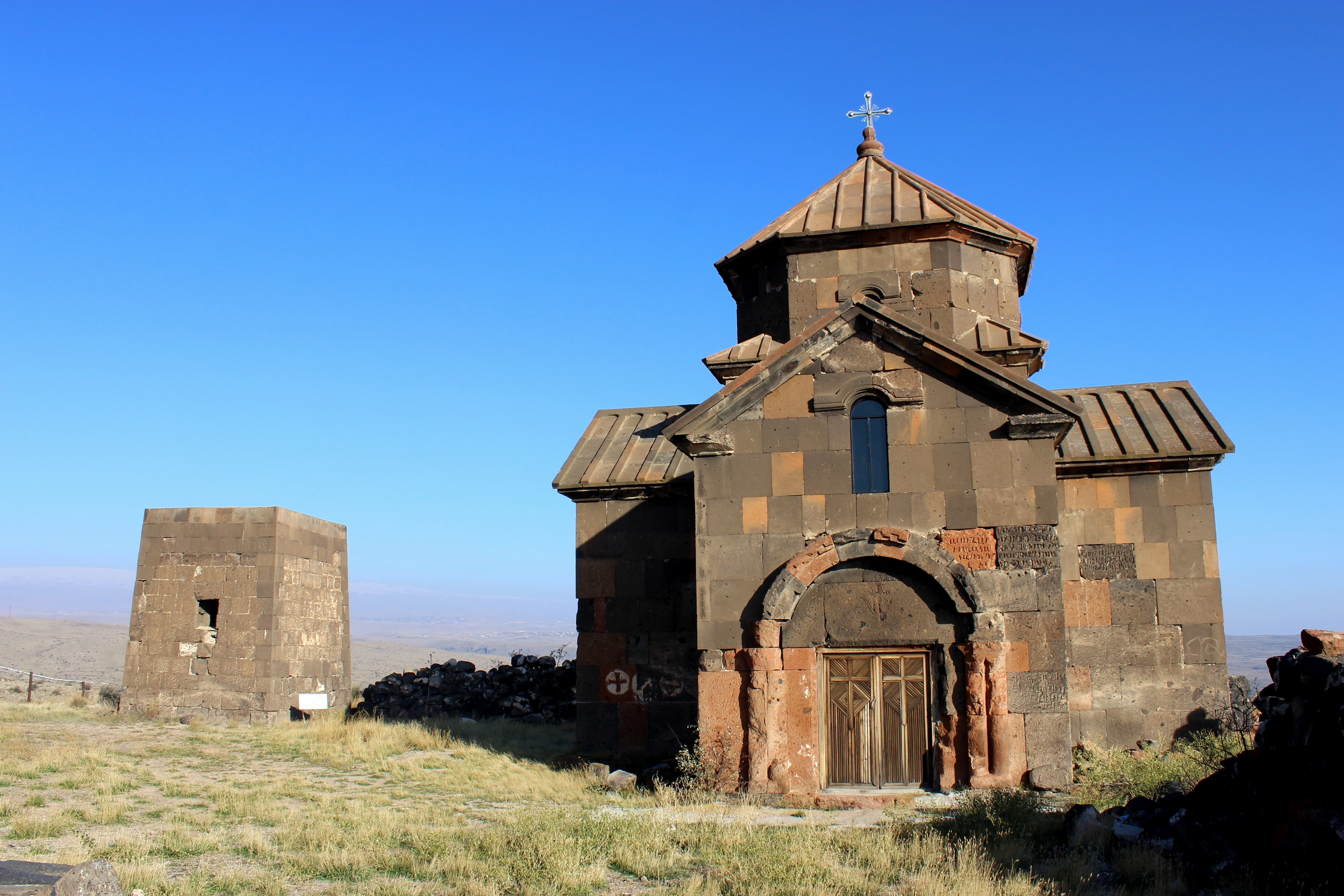
Saint Christopher Monastery, Dashtadem, 7th century

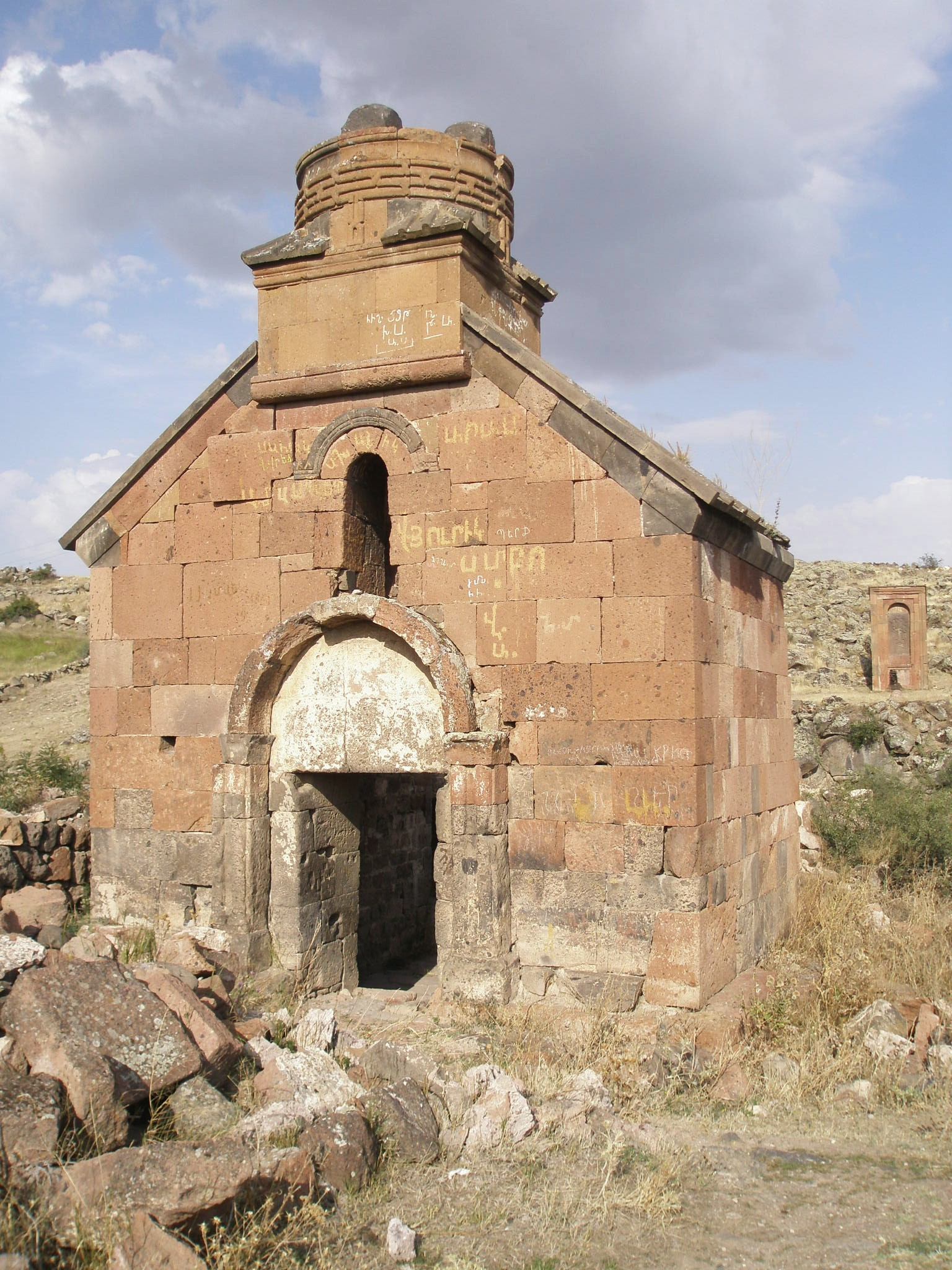
Artavazik Church, Byurakan, 7th century

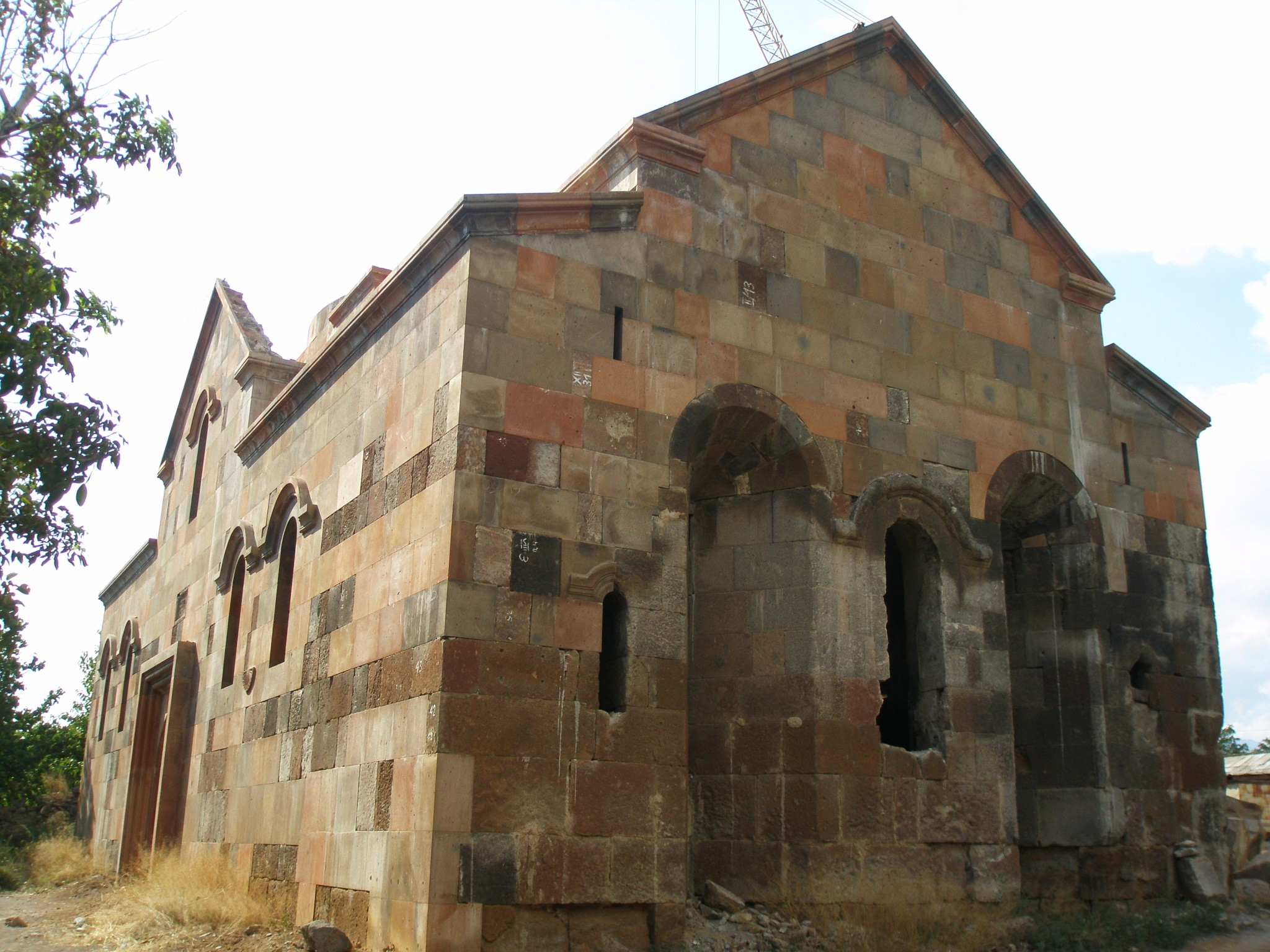
Surp Hovhannes Church, Voskevaz, 7th century

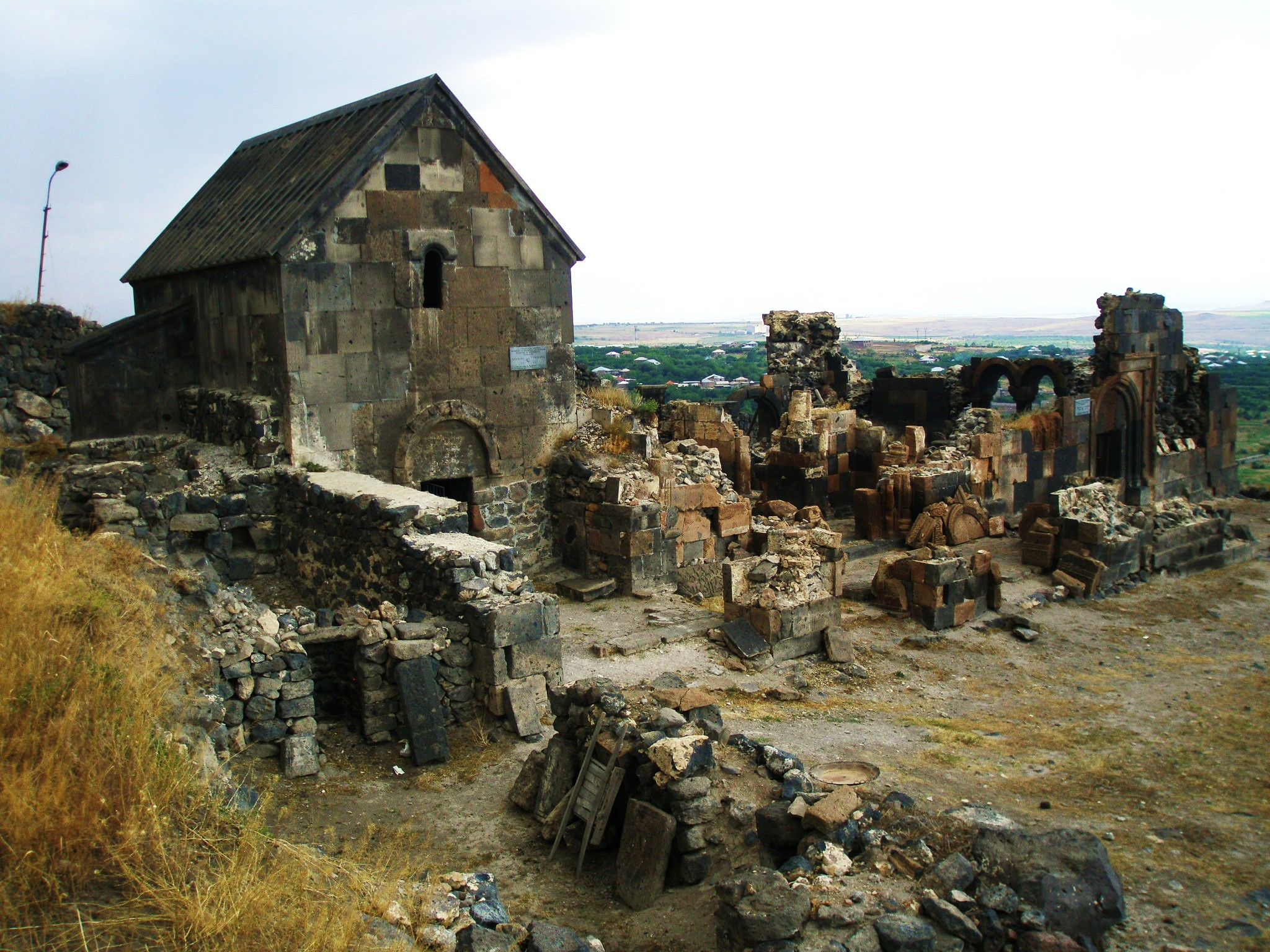
Saint Sarkis Monastery, Ushi, 7th century

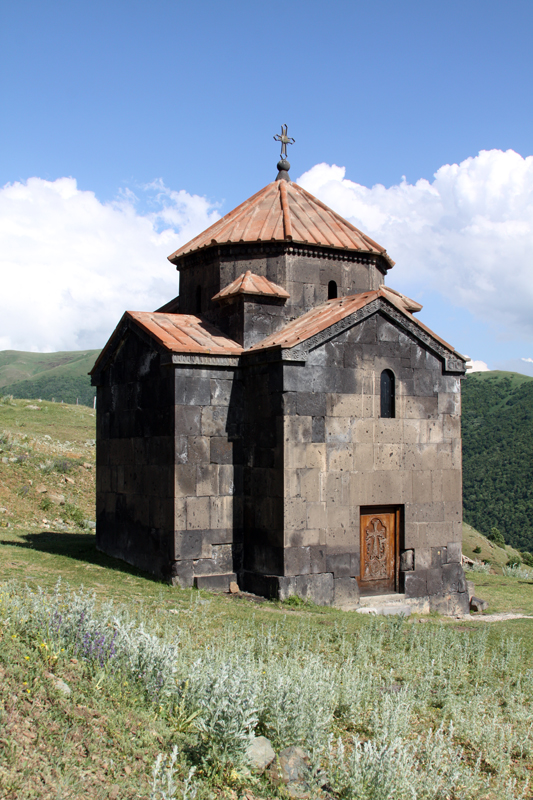
Tukh Manuk Chapel, Lusagyugh, 7th century

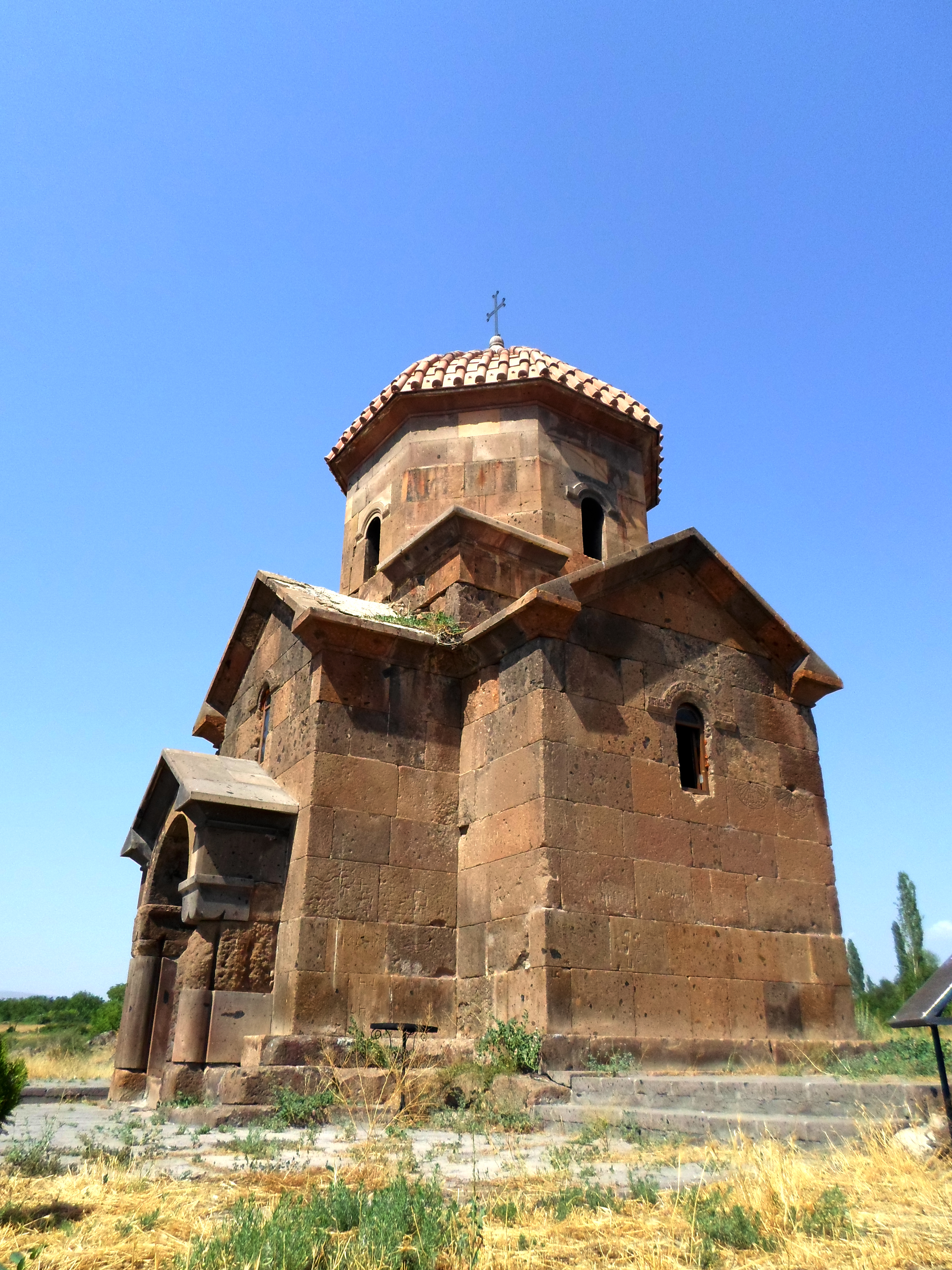
Saint Zion Church, Oshakan, 7th century

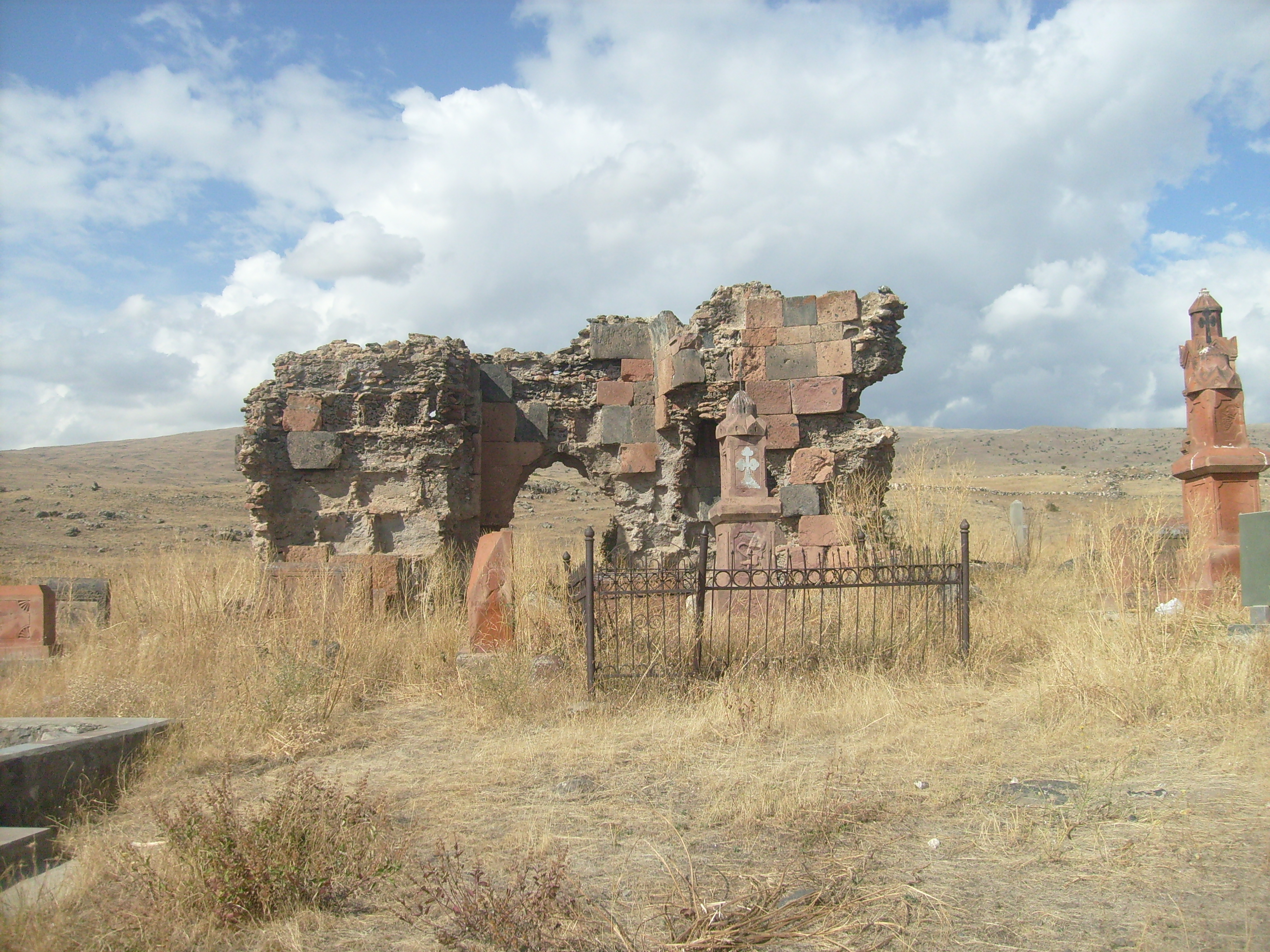
Surp Astvatsatsin Basilica, Verin Sasunik, 7th century

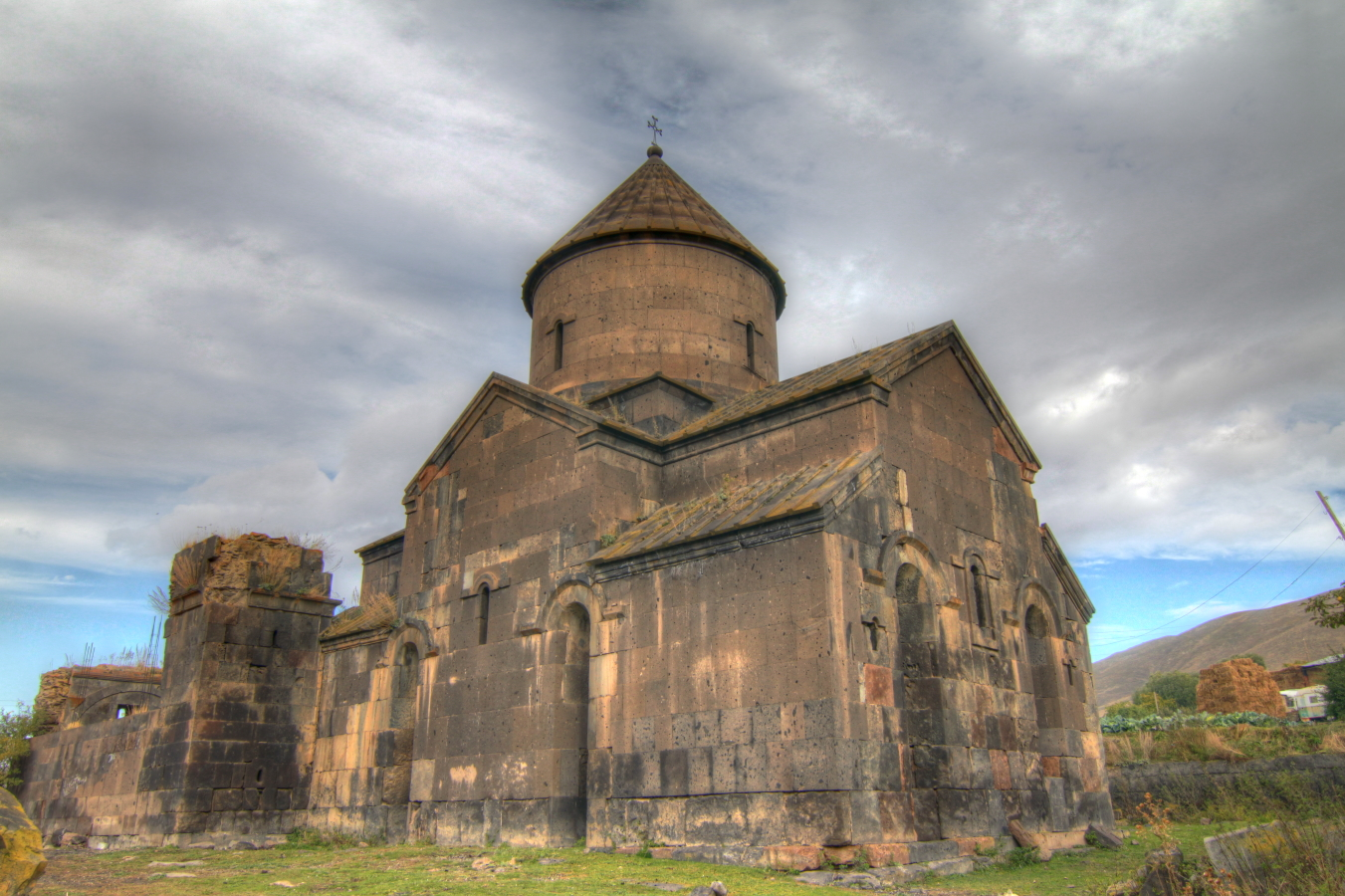
Yeghipatrush Church of the Holy Mother of God, Yeghipatrush, 10th century

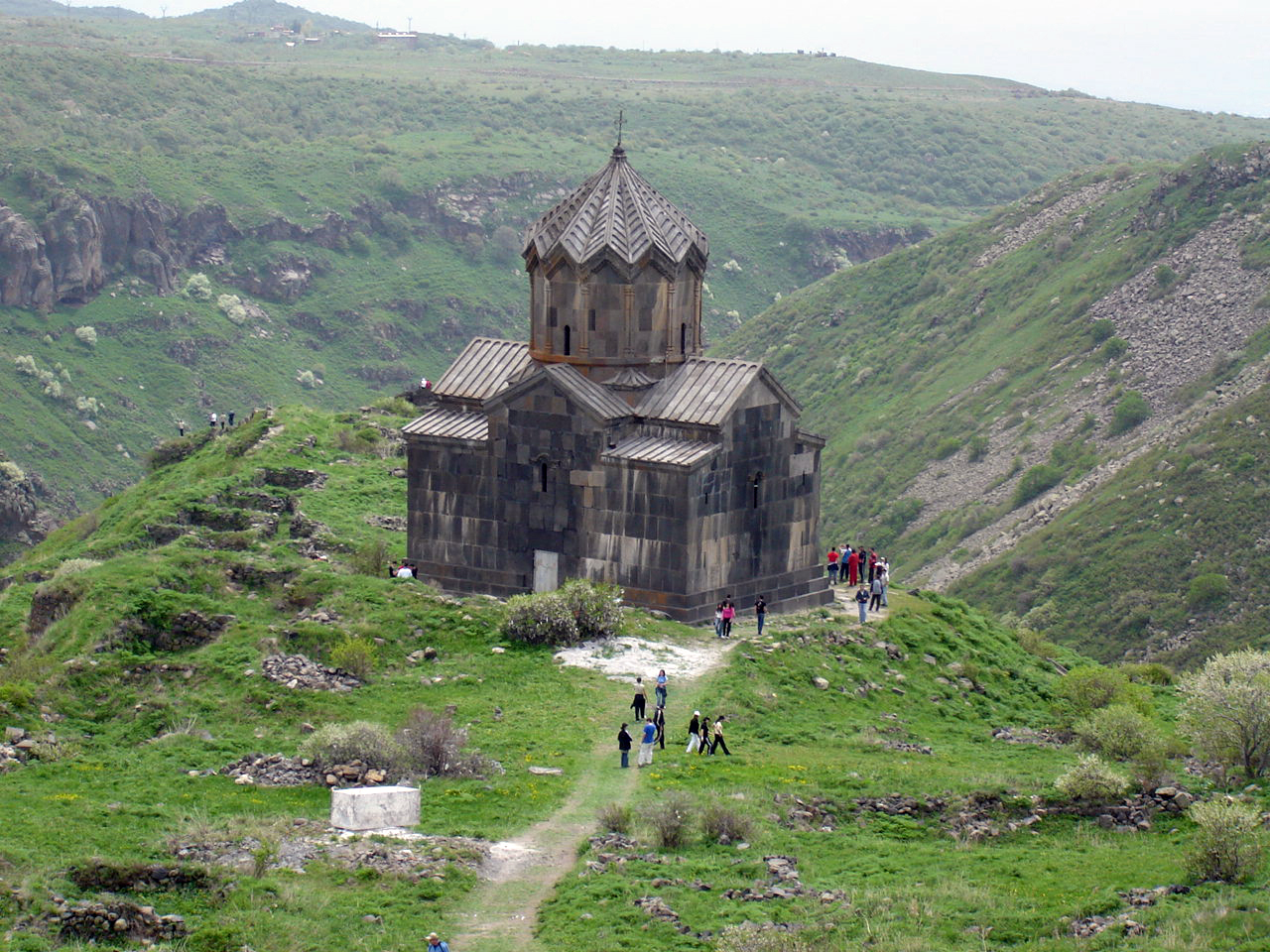
Vahramashen Church of the Holy Mother of God, Byurakan, 1026

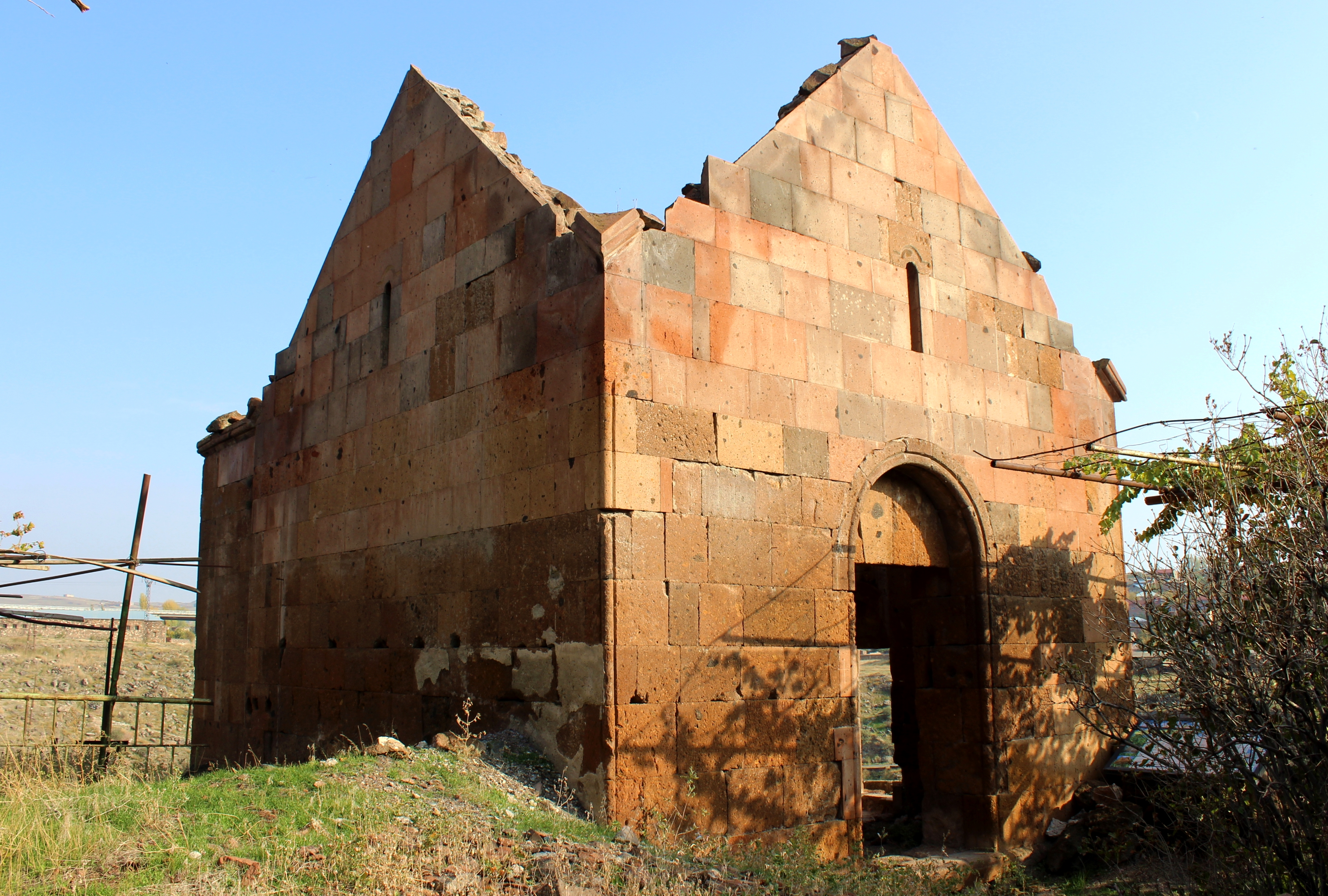
Spitakavor Church, Ashtarak, 13th century

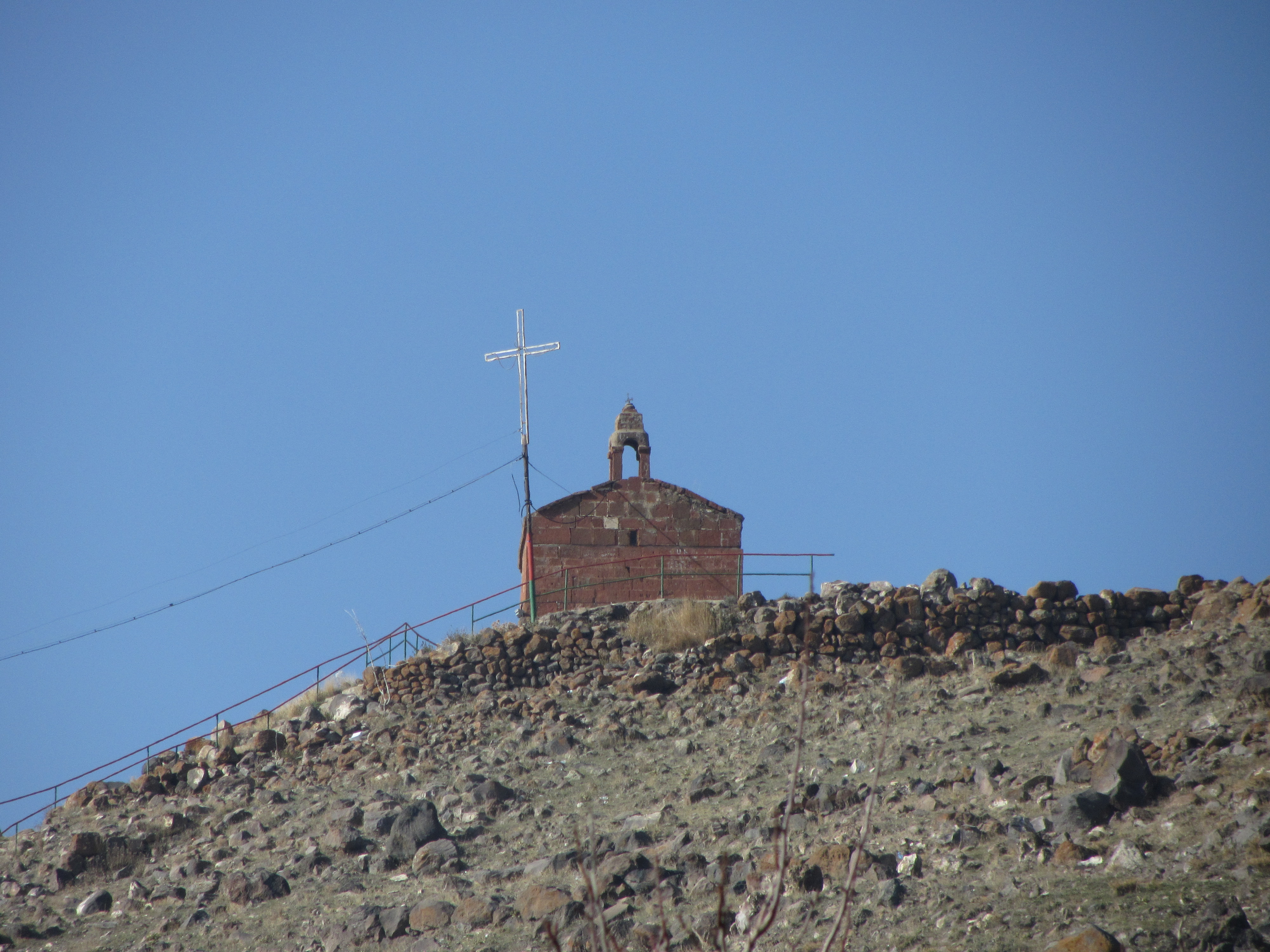
Surp Stepanos Nakhavka Church, Mastara, 17th century

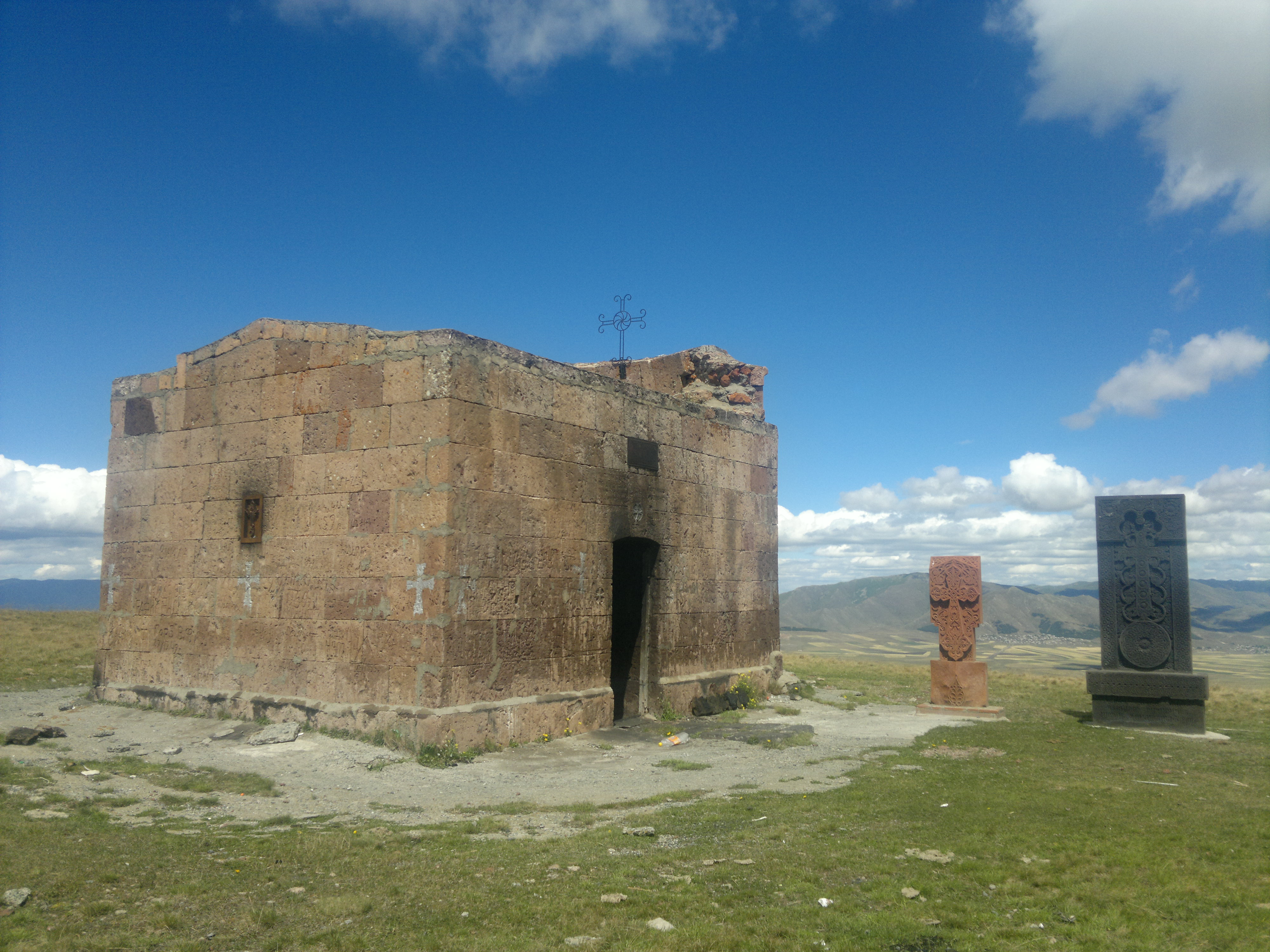
Berkarat Church, Berkarat, 19th century

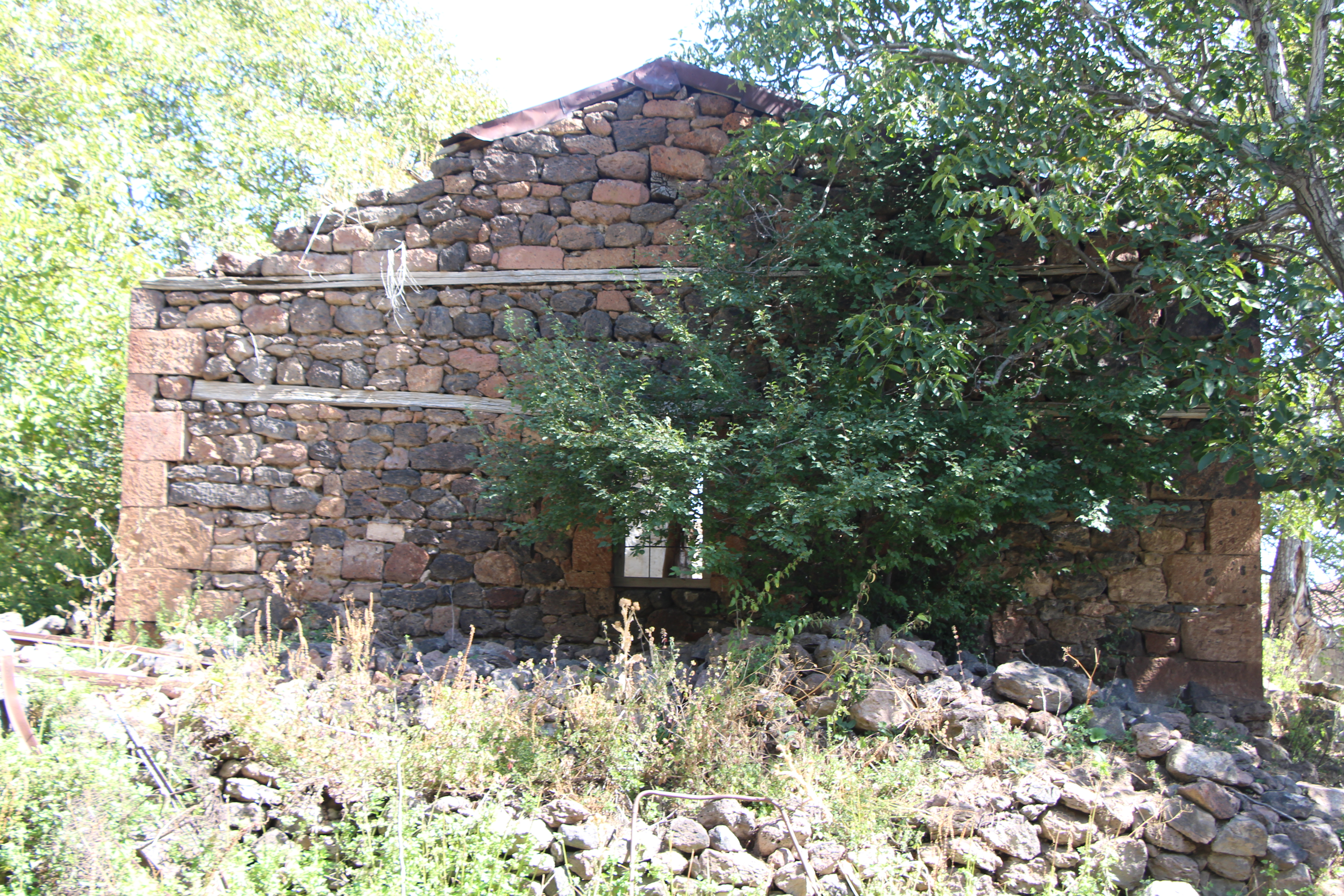
Holy Mother of God Church, Antarut, 19th century

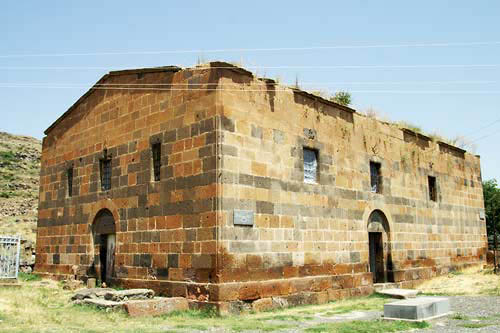
Saint George's Church, Kosh, 19th century

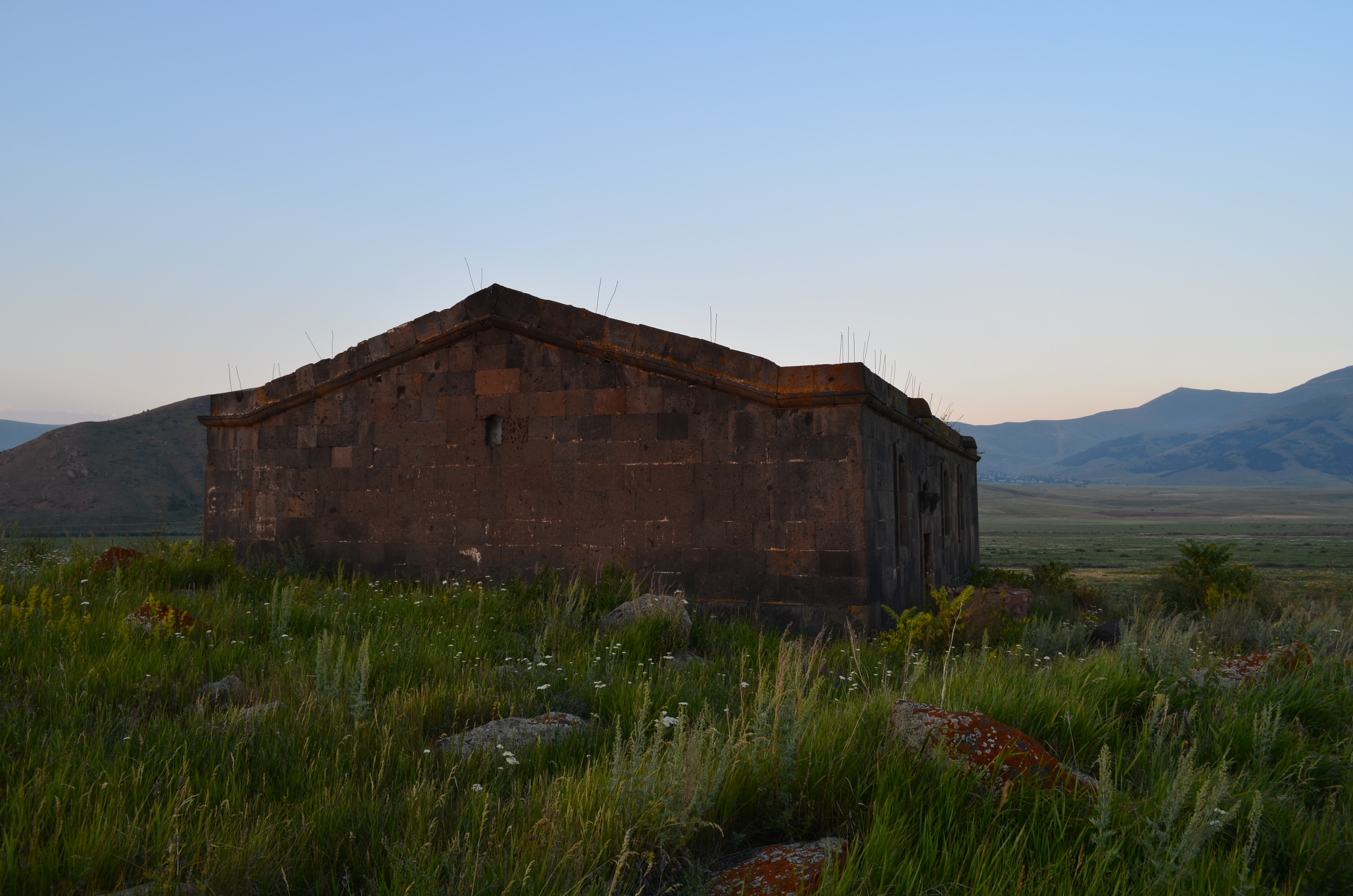
Saint George's Church, Kuchak, 1891
