= Spitakavor Church of Ashtarak =

Church in the town of Ashtarak

Spitakavor Church Սպիտակավոր եկեղեցի
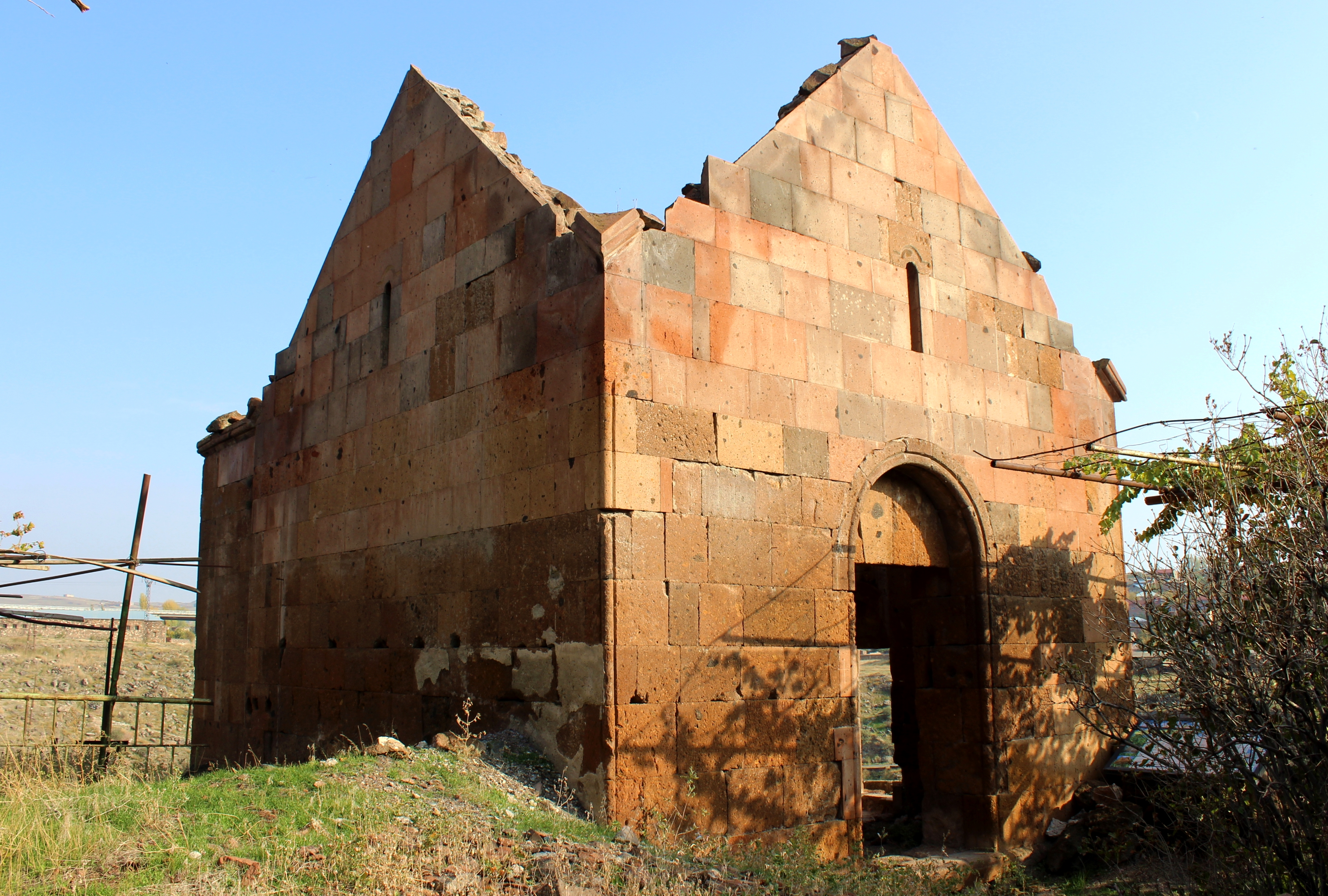
- Spitakavor Church, October 2014

- Location within Armenia Location within Aragatsotn

Religion
- Affiliation: Armenian Apostolic Church

Location
- Location: Ashtarak, Aragatsotn Province, Armenia
- Coordinates: 40.299628°N 44.365417°E

Architecture
- Type: Small cruciform central-plan
- Style: Armenian
- Completed: 13th century

Spitakavor Church (Armenian: Սպիտակավոր եկեղեցի); literally meaning white-colored church, is a 13th-century partly ruined Armenia church located at the edge of a gorge in the town of Ashtarak, Aragatsotn Province, Armenia.

== Confusion about the name ==
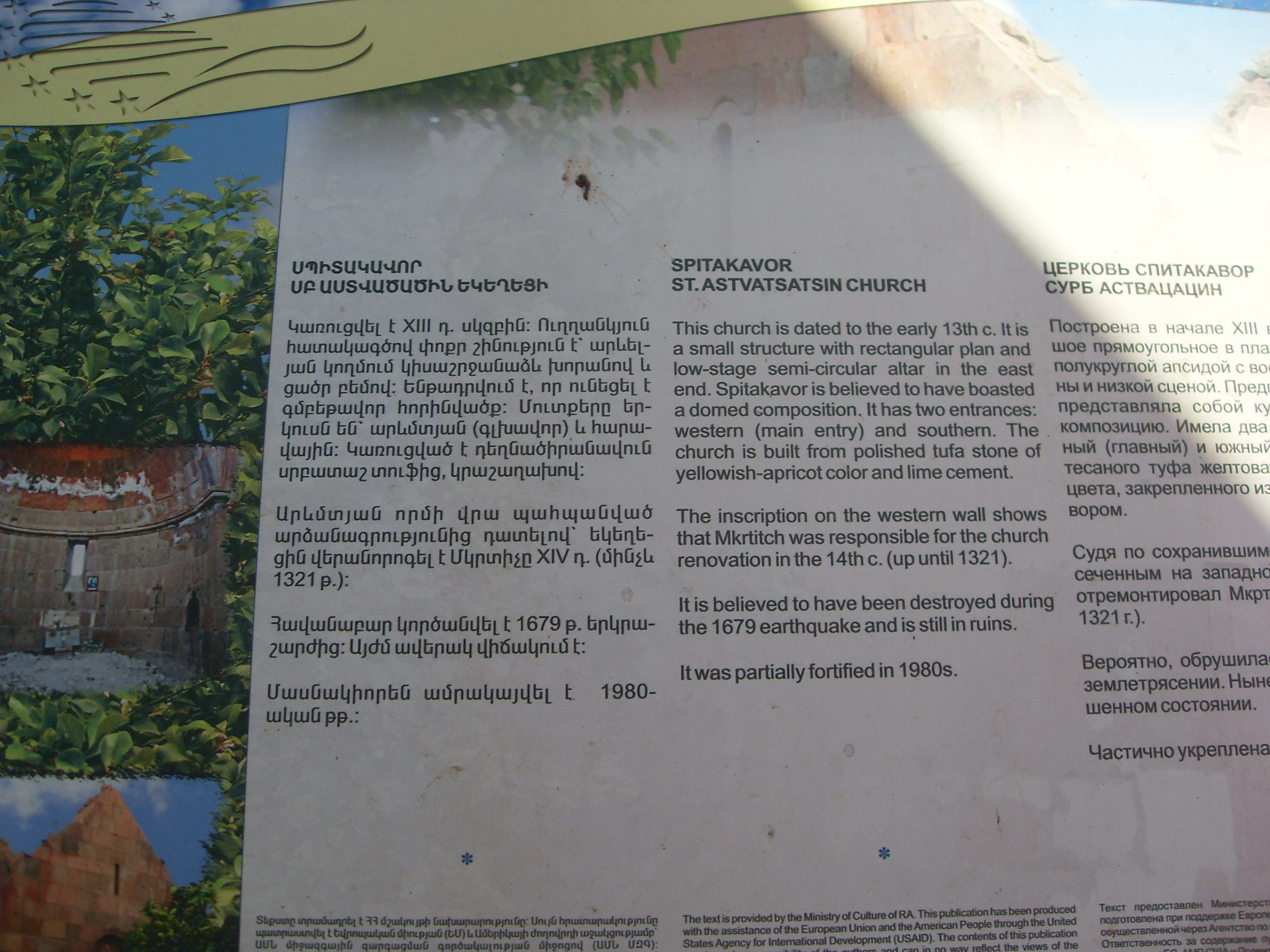
EU-sponsored information plaque with building description headed by wrong name at 13th Century Tsiranavor Church

Some confusion about the name of the churches of Spitakavor and Tsiranavor has seemed to have occurred due to the misplacement of the Russian markers located inside the two structures. New EU-sponsored information plaques with building descriptions adopted the wrong designations of the older plates thus amplifying the confusion.

Anyone that lives in the city around the area will tell you that Spitakavor ("Whitish") is the white church from the 5th Century, and Tsiranavor ("Apricotish") is the apricot colored church from the 13th Century. The name plaques at the churches however will tell you the opposite.

Nearby is also the church of Karmravor ("Reddish"), formally known as the Church of Holy Mother of God (Surb Astvatsatsin). It is a 7th Century Armenian Apostolic church. Furthermore, there are the churches of S. Mariane and S. Sarkis. In the gorge is a unique bridge built in 1664.

== Location ==
It may be seen across the gorge from the church of Surp Sarkis, but is easiest reached via the streets of the neighborhood that it sits within. Very close (down the street 3 houses) and also sitting along the gorge is the church of Spitakavor (literally meaning whitish because of its color), built between the 5th-6th centuries.

== Architecture ==
Spitakavor is a small cruciform type church constructed during the 13th century. It is apricot-orange in color, because of the tufa stone used for the construction of the building. Presently, only the walls remain since the roof, drum, and dome have collapsed. There is a main portal to the structure at the front façade, and another at the side of the church. Interior walls are flat except for the semi-circular apse located directly across from the main portal. Very little decoration adorns the church other than some cruciform relief found on the exterior walls.

== Legend ==
According to a legend, three sisters lived in Ashtarak, all of whom fell in love with the same man, prince Sargis. The elder two sisters decided to commit suicide in favor of the youngest one. One wearing an apricot-orange dress and the other wearing a red dress, they threw themselves into the gorge. When the youngest sister found out, she put on a white dress and also threw herself into the gorge. Sargis then became a hermit and three small churches appeared at the edge of the gorge, named after the sisters' dress colors.

== Gallery ==
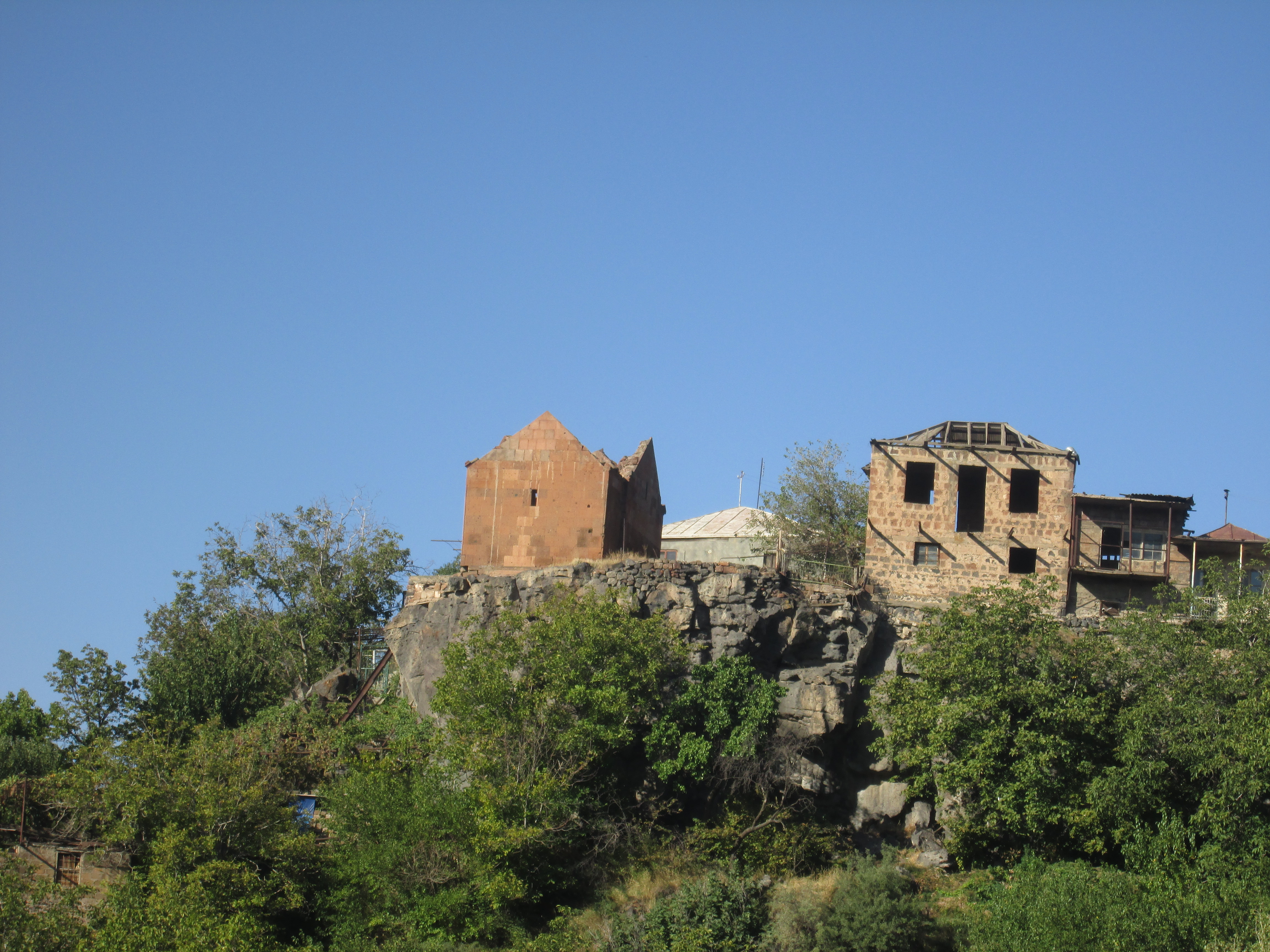
Eastern and northern side of Tsiranavor Church from the distance

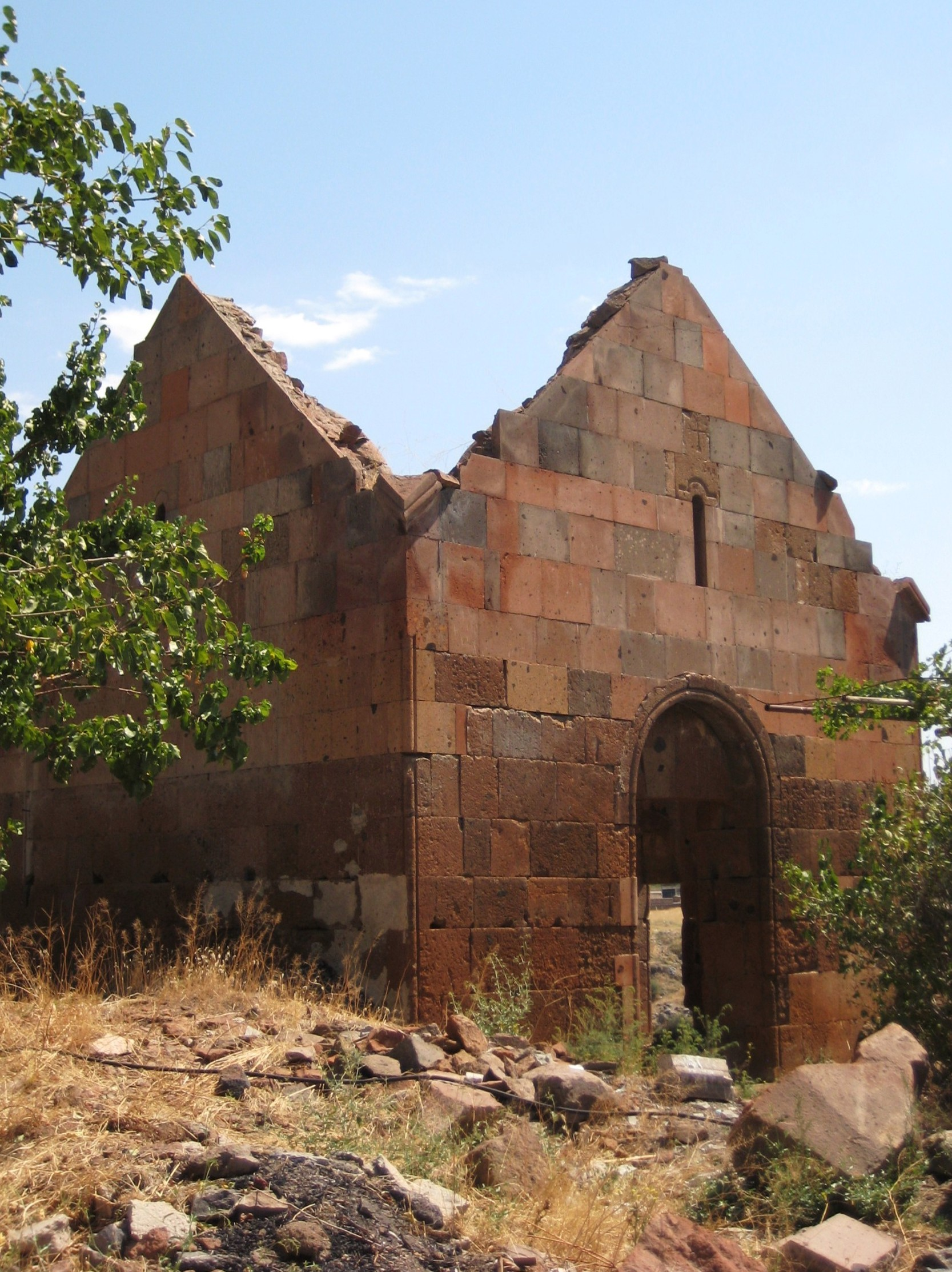
Main entrance at the western side with southern entry in the background

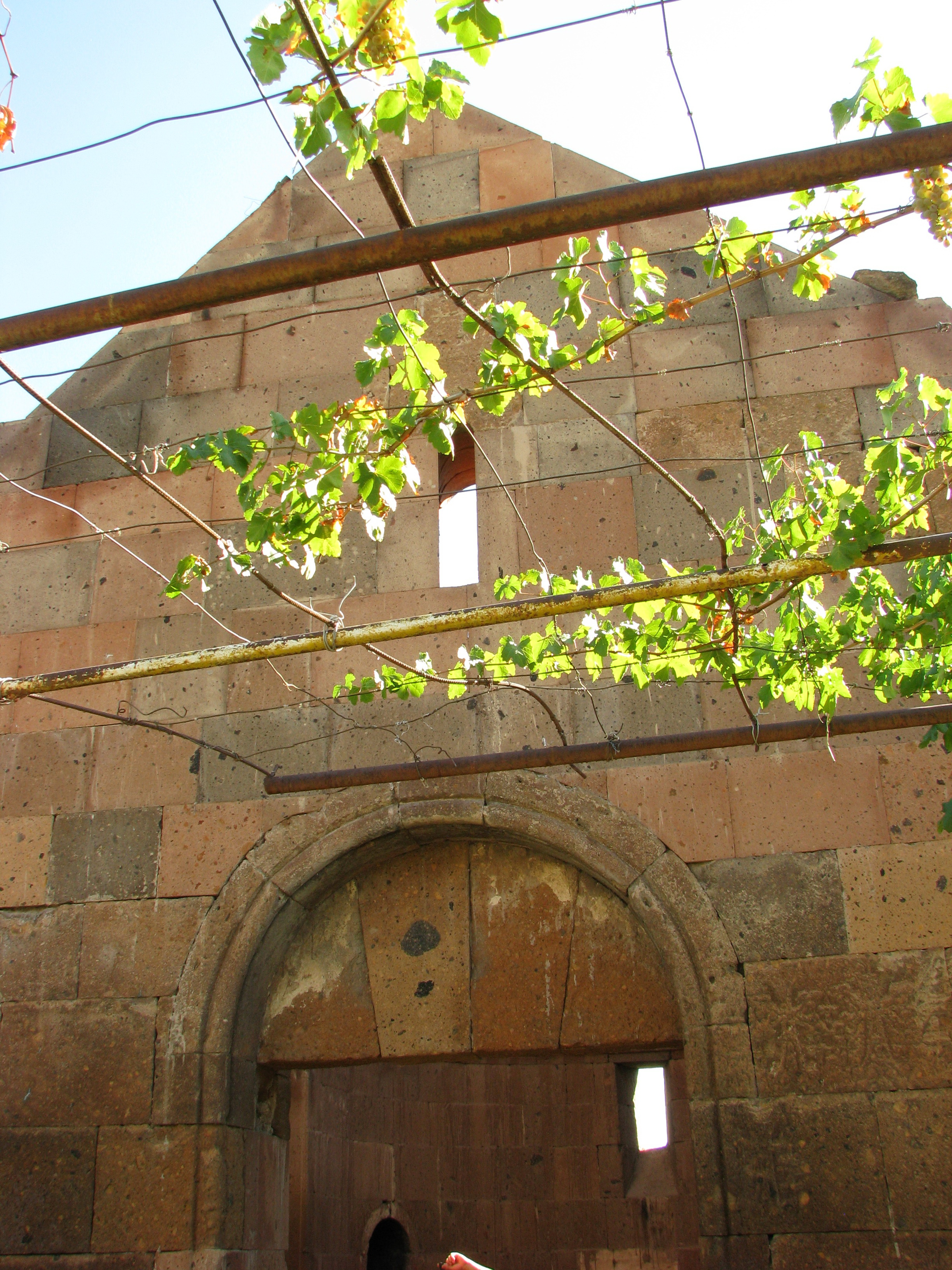
Main entrance at the western side

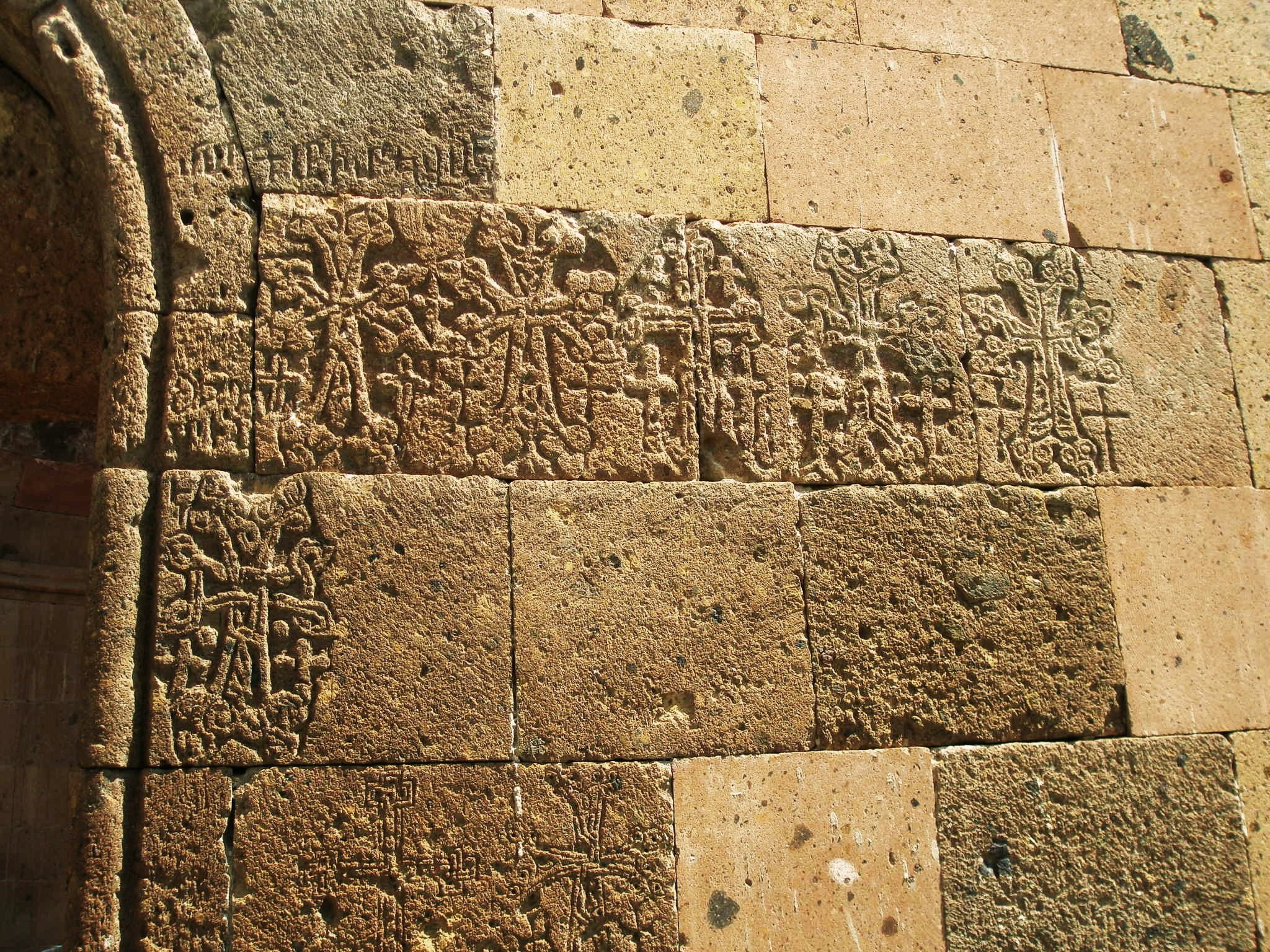
Cross carvings on the front exterior wall to the right of the main portal.

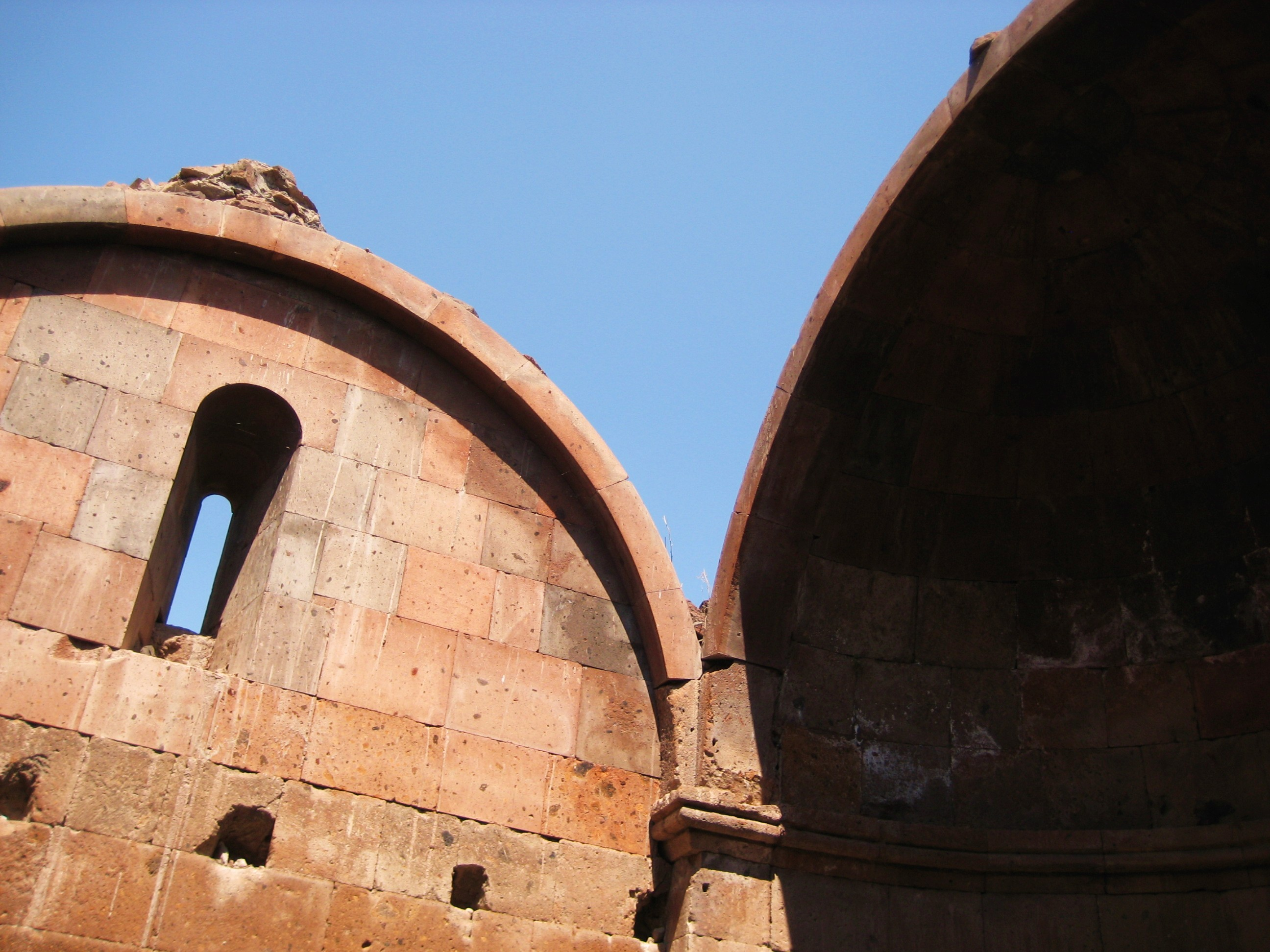
Reconstructed sections of the upper walls.

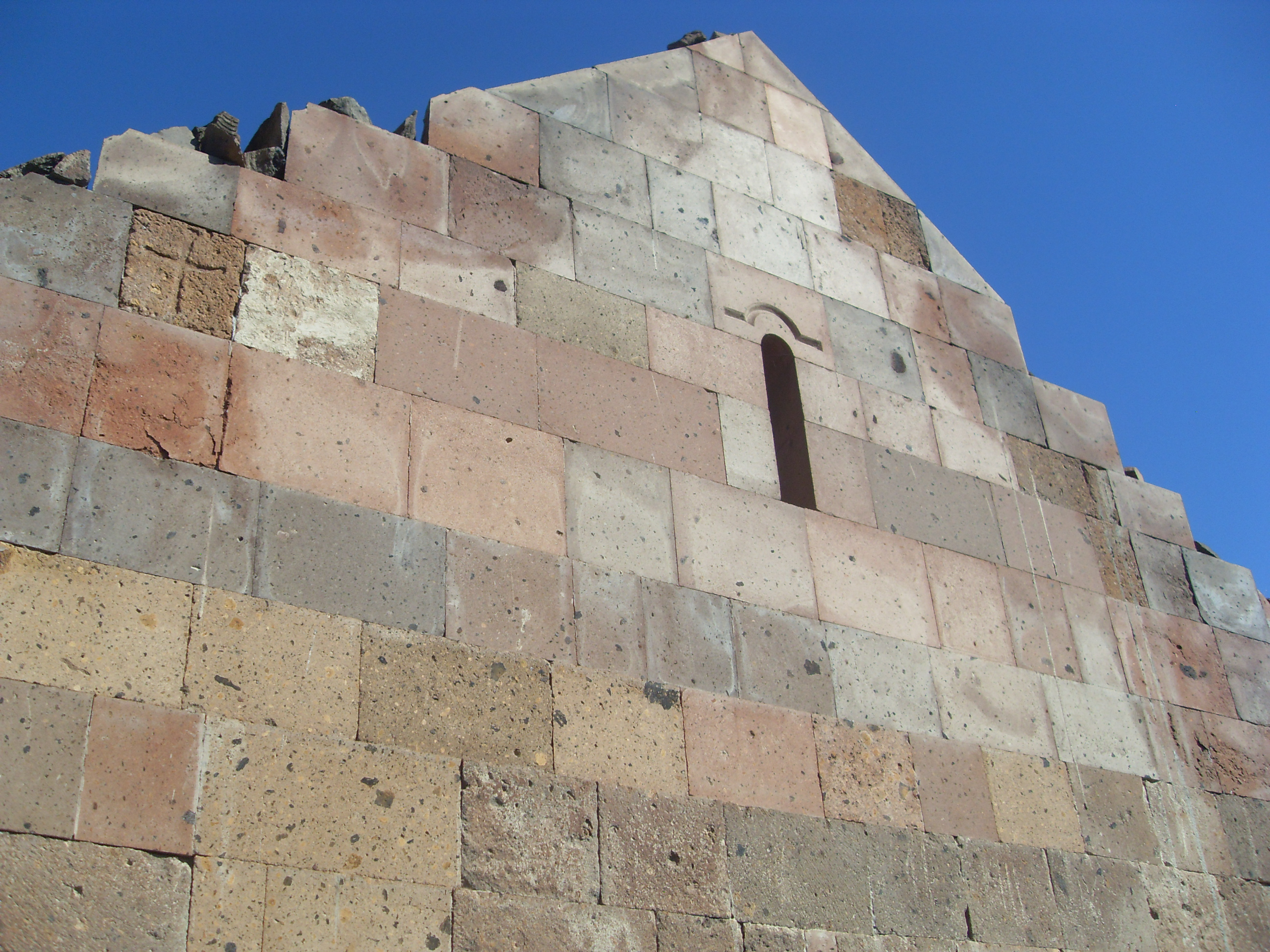

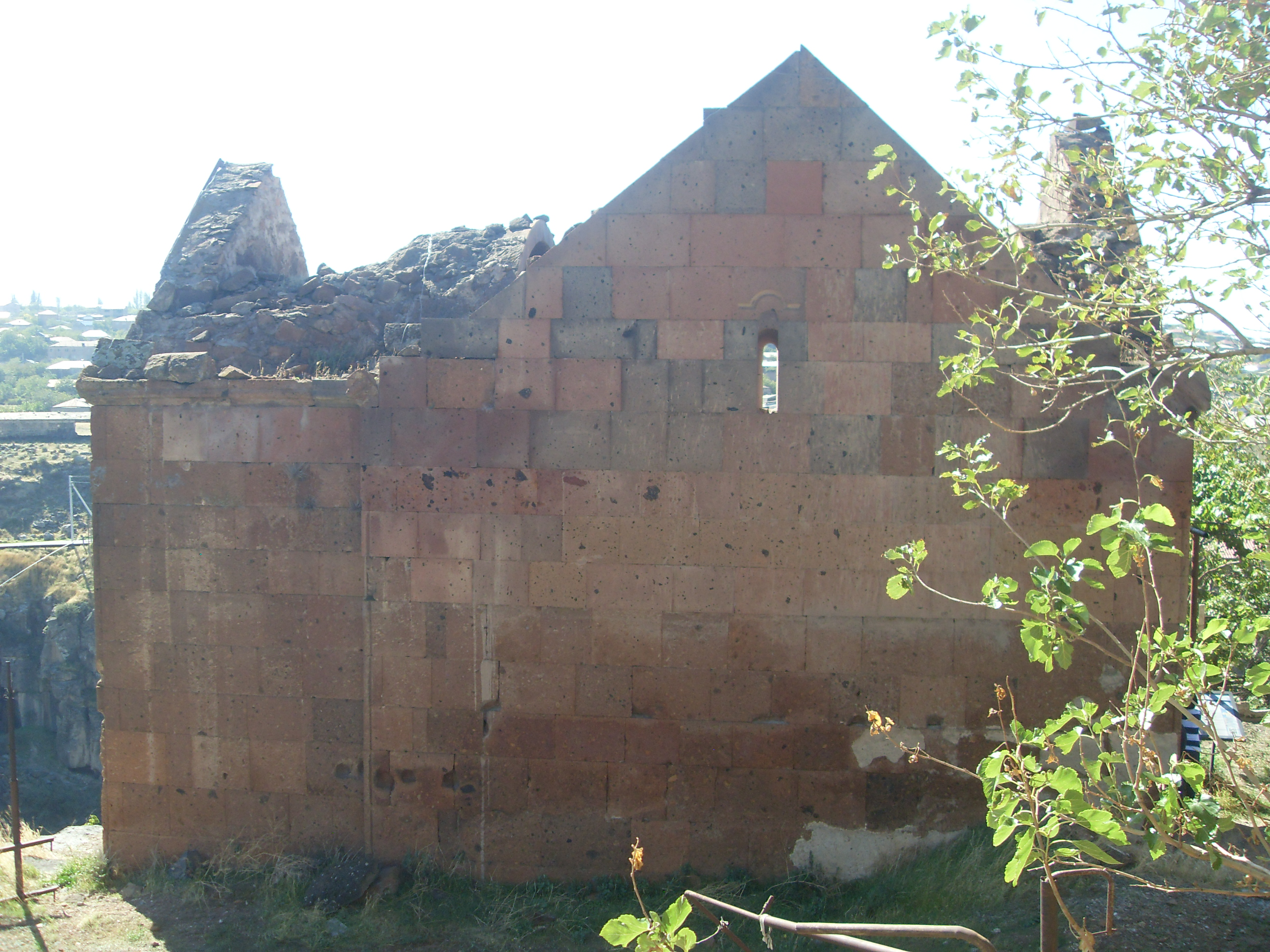
Northern side

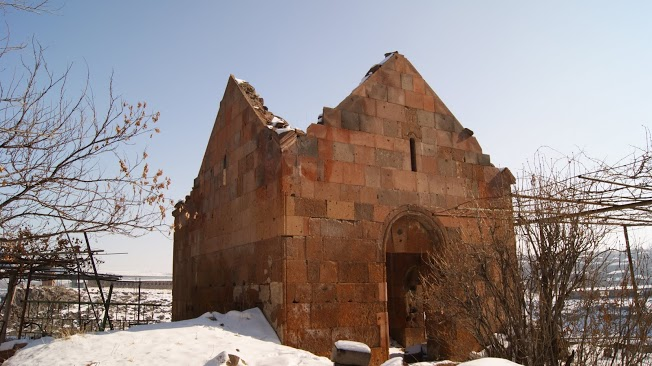
Tsiranavor Church in winter
