= Vardges Petrosyan =

Armenian writer (1932–1994)

Vardges Petrosyan Վարդգես Պետրոսյան
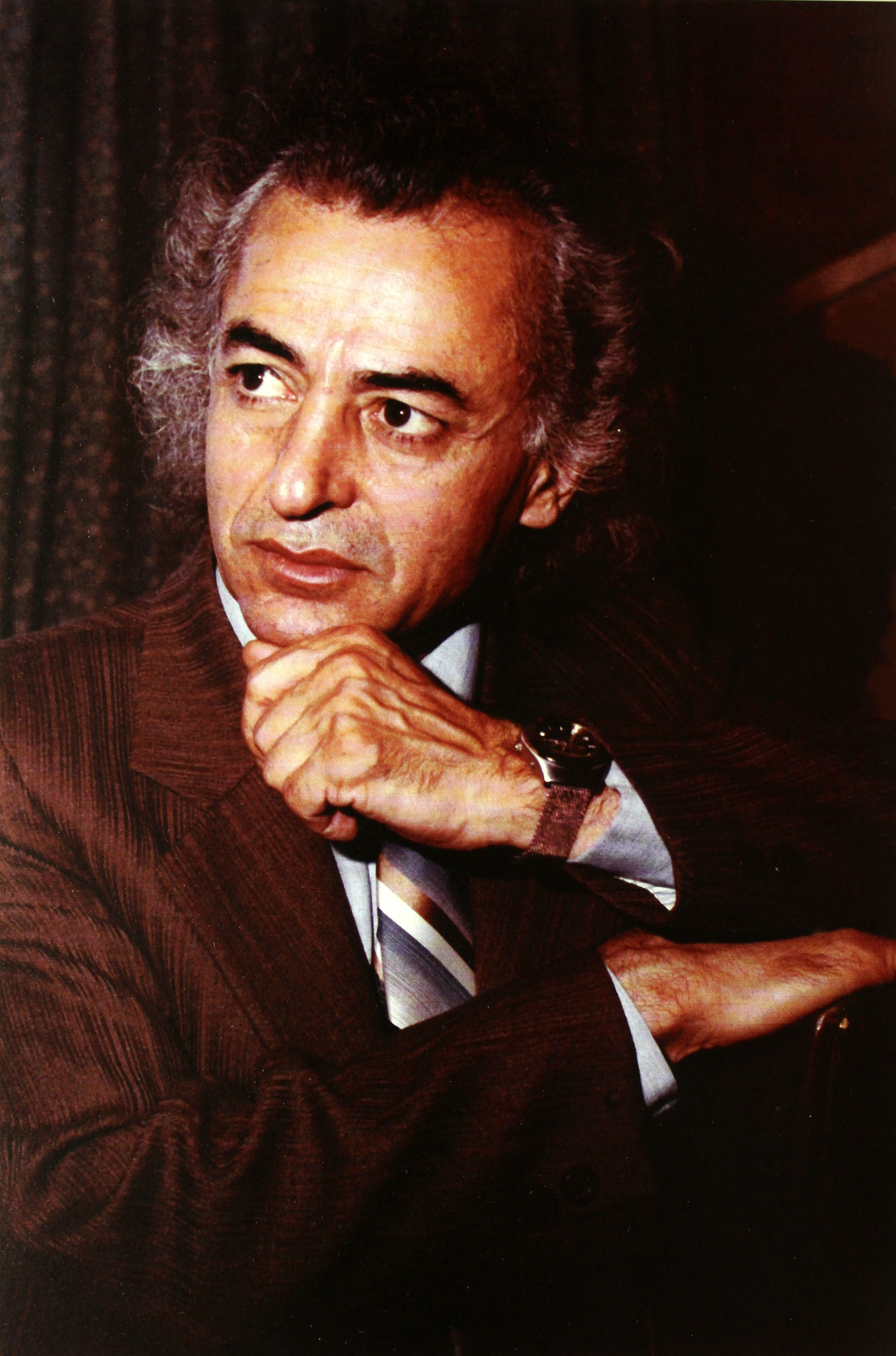
- Born: August 9, 1932; Ashtarak, Soviet Armenia
- Died: April 15, 1994 (aged 61); Yerevan, Armenia
- Education: Yerevan University
- Occupation: writer
- Writing career
- Genres: fiction and drama

Vardges Hamazaspi Petrosyan (Armenian: Վարդգես Համազասպի Պետրոսյան; August 9, 1932 – April 15, 1994) was a Soviet Armenian novelist, playwright, essayist and politician. He was assassinated in 1994, aged 61.

== Biography ==
Vardges Hamazaspi Petrosyan was born in 1932 in the town of Ashtarak, where he spent his childhood, went to school and began writing his first verses. In 1954, he graduated from the journalism department of Yerevan State University and started writing for several youth newspapers. As a newspaper correspondent, he travelled throughout his native Armenia and the entire Soviet Union, from Yakutia in Eastern Siberia to Karelia in the northwest of the country.

His first collection of poems, The Ballad about Man (Ballad mardu masin), was published in 1958. His subsequent works are in prose. He is best known for his novellas The Last Teacher (Verjin usutsiche, 1980), Years Lived and Unlived (Aprats yev chaprats tariner, 1970), the series of short stories Letters from the Stations of Childhood (Namakner mankutyan kayarannerits), Drugstore Ani (Deghatun "Ani", 1973), the essay series "Armenian Sketches" ("Haykakan eskizner"), and the play Heavy is the Hat of Hippocrates (Tsanr e Hipokrati glkharke, 1975). Several of his works were adapted into plays. His novel The Solitary Walnut Tree (Menavor enkuzeni, 1981) was adapted into a film by director Frunze Dovlatyan in 1986. This novel was also published in English translation under the title The Solitary Hazel Tree in the magazine Soviet Literature (1983, no. 5/422).

Most of Petrosyan's works, such as The Half-Open Windows of the City (Kaghaki kisabats lusamutnere, 1964) and Drugstore Ani, have youth and its psychological features as their subject. His novel The Solitary Hazel Tree depicts the modern life and issues of Armenia's mountainous villages. The essay series "Armenian Sketches" are dedicated to the life and history of Soviet Armenia and the Armenian diaspora and the importance of the connection between the two. His articles, travelogues and literary reviews were published in the collection An Equation with Multiple Unknowns (Havasarum bazmativ anhaytnerov) in 1977. He published a two-volume collection of his selected works (Entir yerker) in 1983.

From 1966 to 1975, he was the editor-in-chief of the Armenian monthly literary journal Garun (Spring). In 1975, he was elected first secretary of the board of the Writers' Union of Armenia. He served as the president of the Writers' Union from 1981 to 1988. Petrosyan received the Armenia Komsomol Prize in 1969 and the State Prize of the Armenian SSR in 1979. He was also honored with the Order of the Badge of Honour and the Order of the October Revolution. He joined the Communist Party in 1952 and became a member of the Central Committee of the Communist Party of Armenia in 1976. Petrosyan served multiple terms as a deputy in the Supreme Soviet of the Armenian SSR (1975–1985 and 1990–1994; after 1991, the Supreme Council of the Republic of Armenia) and the Supreme Soviet of the Soviet Union (1984–1989). In 1994, he founded the newspaper Yerkir Nairi.

== Death ==
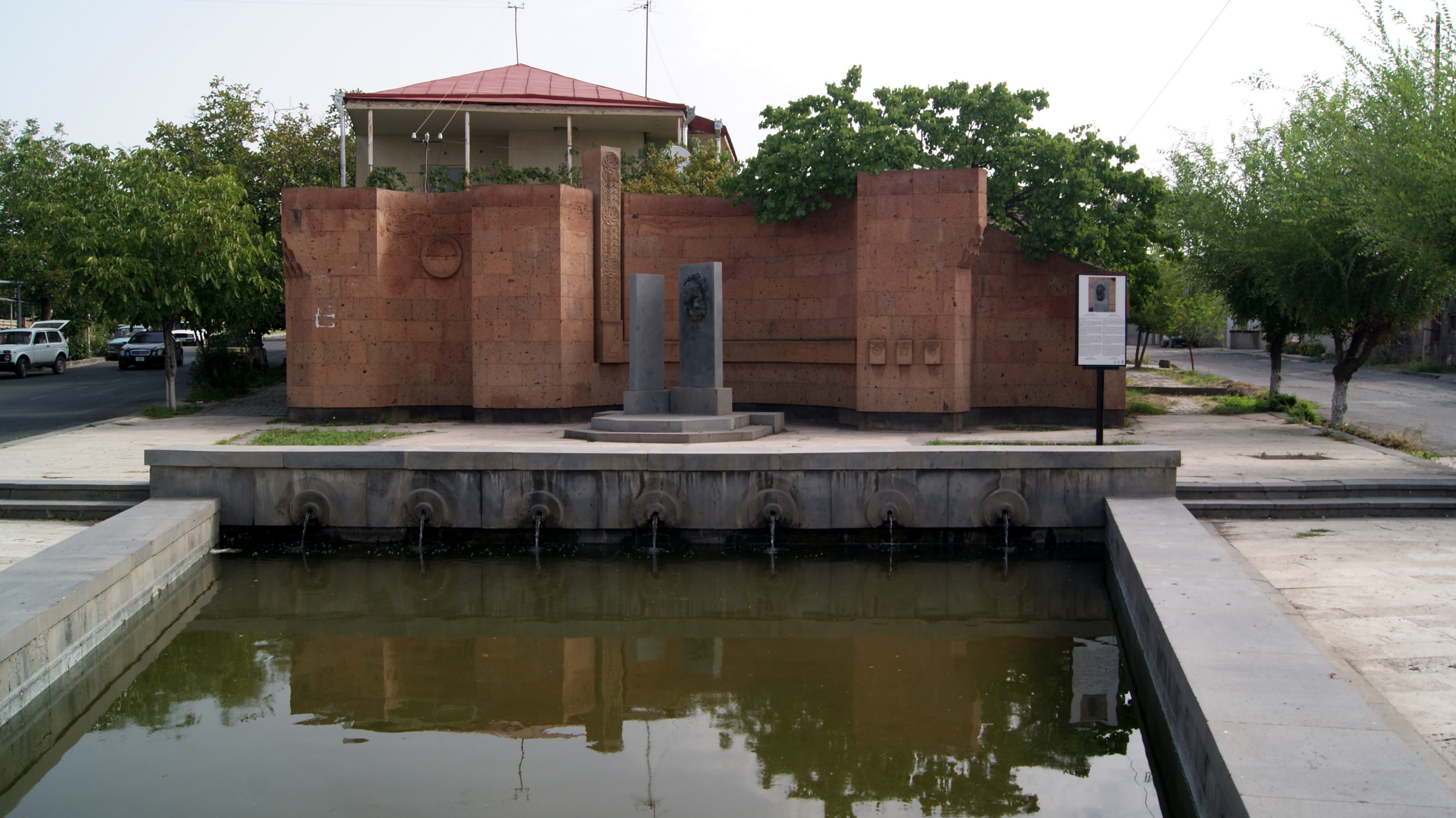
Monument to Vardges Petrosyan in Ashtarak

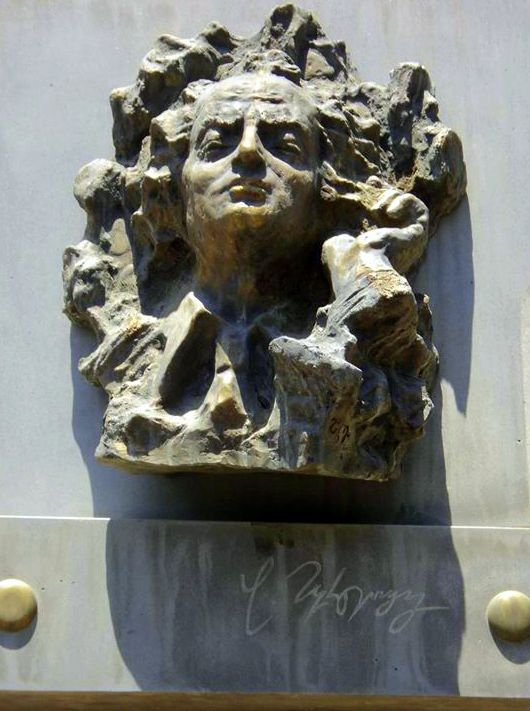
Bust of Vardges Petrosyan on the wall of Yerevan School No. 51

Petrosyan was shot dead on April 15, 1994 near the entrance to his house in Yerevan. His assassination remains unsolved. In 2000, Yerevan School No. 51 was named after him.

== General references ==
- Antonyan, Suren. Vardges Petrosyaně im husherum. [Erevan]: [s.n.], 1997. [Erevan] : [s.n.], 1997. OCLC: 44174342
- Chʻekʻelezyan, E. H., S. K. Chagharyan, and S. A. Babayan. Vardges Petrosyan: (kensamatenagitakan tsʻank). Erevan: HSSH Al. Myasnikyani anvan Petakan Gradaran, 1987. OCLC 26449223
- Gasparyan, D. (1983). "Petrosyan Vardges Hamazaspi". In Hambardzumyan, Viktor (ed.). Haykakan sovetakan hanragitaran (in Armenian). Vol. 9. Erevan. p. 264.
- Ayvazyan, H. M., ed. (2007). "Petrosyan Vardges Hamazaspi". Ov ov e: hayer (kensagrakan hanragitaran) (in Armenian). Vol. 2. Erevan: Haykakan hanragitaran hratarakchʻutʻyun. pp. 332–333.
