= Tsiranavor Church of Ashtarak =

5th-century Armenian church

Tsiranavor Church Ծիրանավոր եկեղեցի
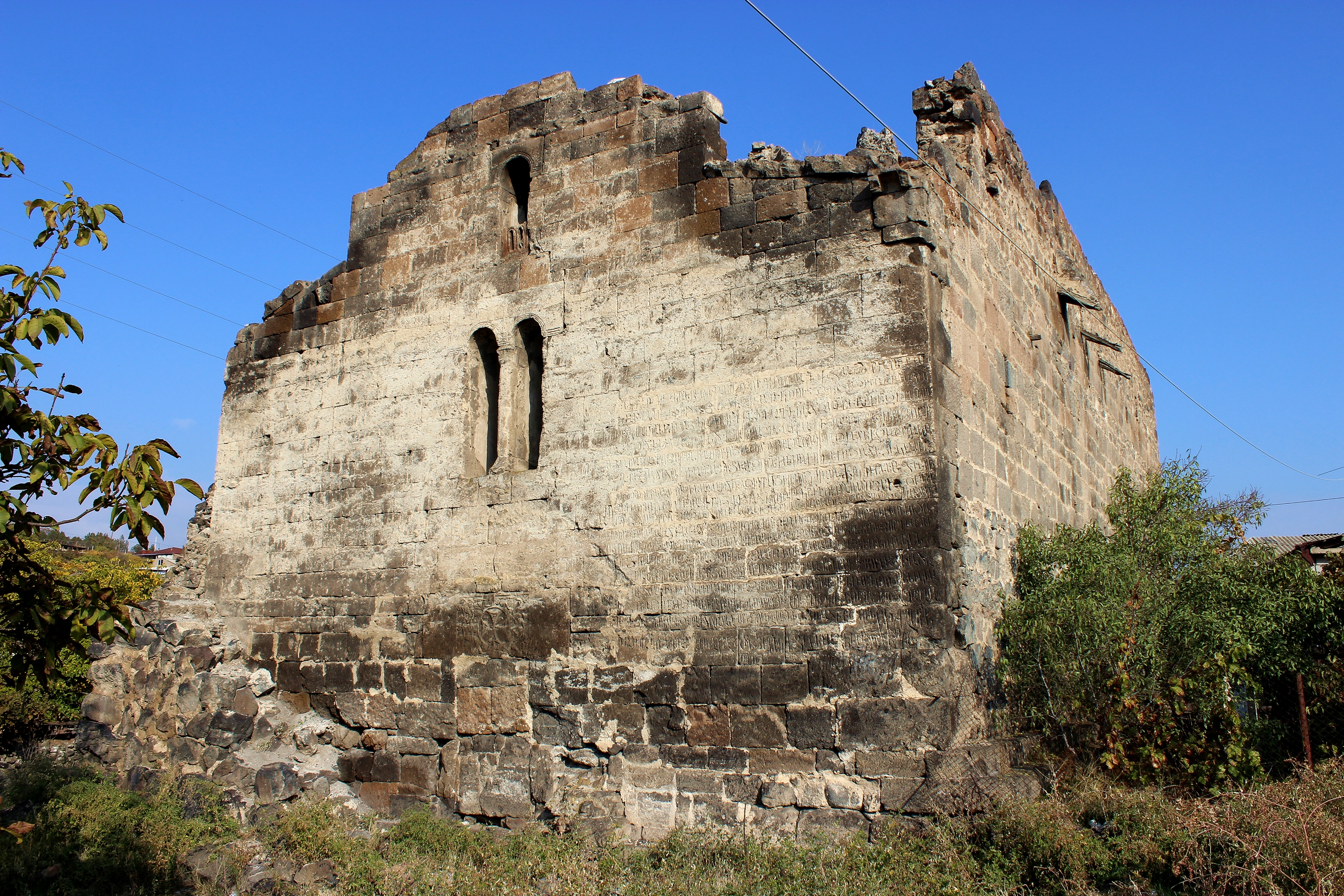
- Spitakavor Church, October 2014

- Location within Armenia Location within Aragatsotn

Religion
- Affiliation: Armenian Apostolic Church

Location
- Location: Ashtarak, Aragatsotn Province, Armenia
- Coordinates: 40.299628°N 44.365417°E

Architecture
- Type: Three-aisled basilica
- Style: Armenian
- Completed: 5th century

Tsiranavor Church (Armenian: Ծիրանավոր եկեղեցի); literally meaning apricot-colored church is a 5th-century partly ruined Armenian church located at the edge of a gorge in the town of Ashtarak, Aragatsotn Province, Armenia.

== Confusion about the name ==
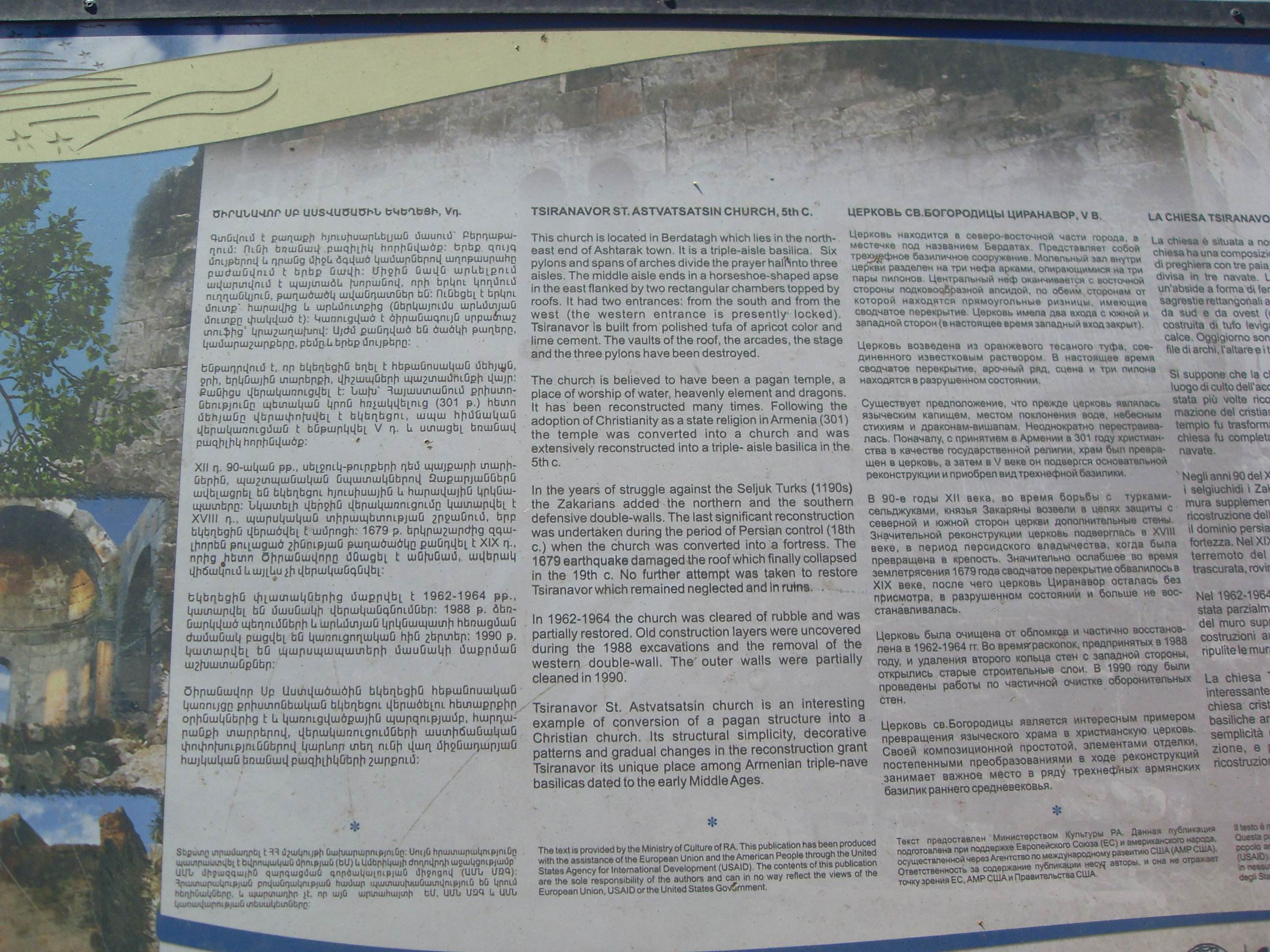
EU-sponsored information plaque with building description headed by wrong name at the 5th Century Church "Spitakavor" (Whitish)

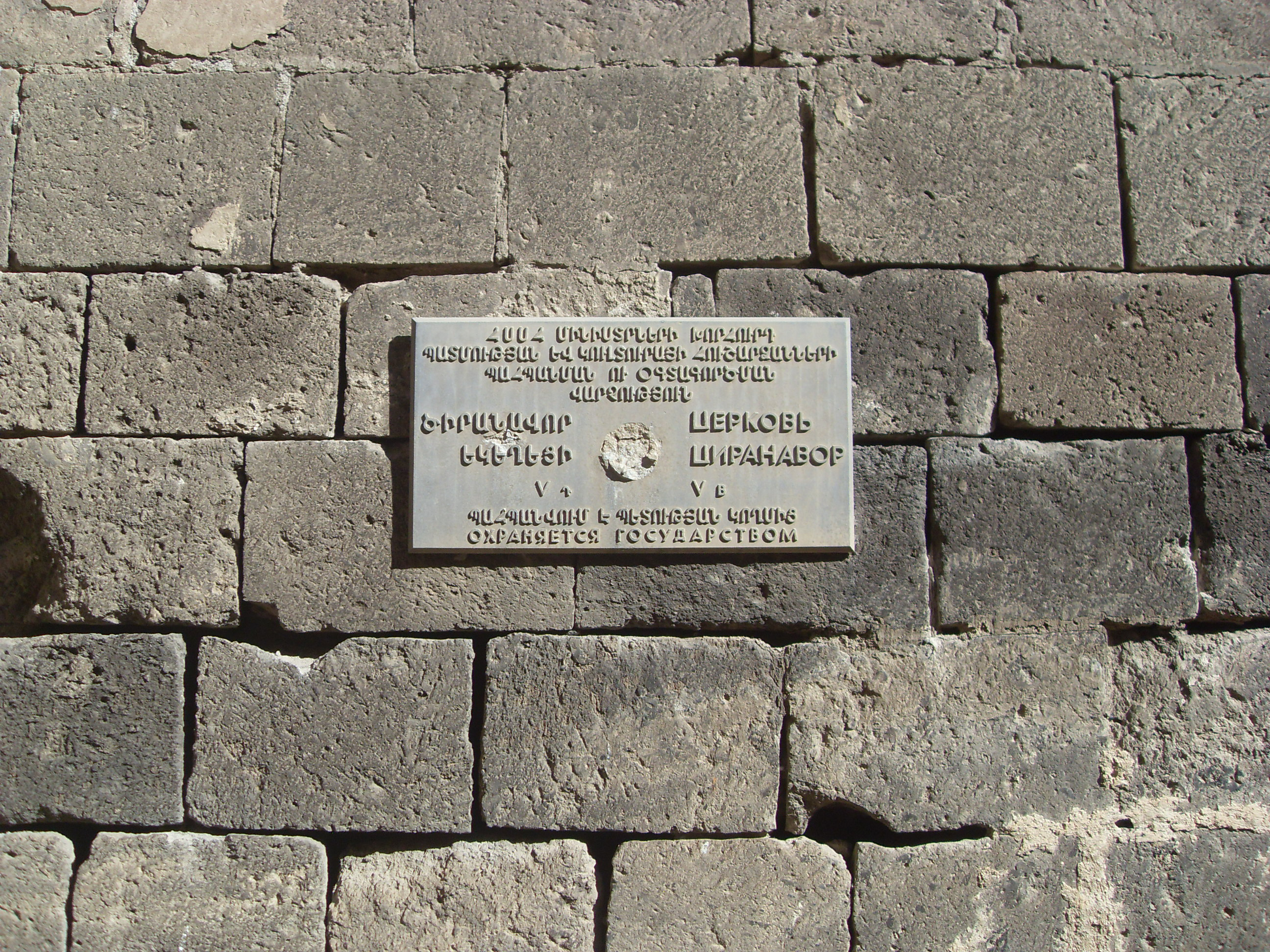
Information plaque in Armenian and Russian language with wrong designation (Церковь Циранавор) at the 5th Century Church "Spitakavor" (Whitish)

Some confusion about the name of the churches of Tsiranavor and Spitakavor has seemed to have occurred due to the misplacement of the Russian markers located inside the two structures. New EU-sponsored information plaques with building descriptions adopted the wrong designations of the older plates thus amplifying the confusion.

Anyone that lives in the city around the area will tell you that Spitakavor ("Whitish") is the white church from the 5th Century, and Tsiranavor ("Apricotish") is the apricot colored church from the 13th Century. The name plaques at the churches however will tell you the opposite.

Nearby is also the church of Karmravor ("Reddish"), formally known as the Church of Holy Mother of God (Surb Astvatsatsin). It is a 7th Century Armenian Apostolic church. Furthermore, there are the churches of S. Mariane and S. Sarkis. In the gorge is a unique bridge built in 1664.

== Location ==
It may be seen across the gorge from the church of Surp Sarkis, but is easiest reached via the streets of the neighborhood that it sits within. Very close (just down the street 3 houses) and also sitting along the gorge is the church of Tsiranavor (literally meaning apricotish because of its color), built between the 13th-14th centuries.

== Architecture ==
Tsiranavor Church is a triple-aisled basilica built in the 5th century, and most-likely renovated the years between 540 and 557. There is not a foundation inscription, but evidence indicating a date for the construction of the church include the archaic T-shaped piers, the arches of the nave, and the two pilasters that survive at the north wall that do not correspond to those at the south wall. Traces of an earlier 5th-century structure in the construction details have also been found.

The front façade had at one time been painted white, and is covered in inscriptions. One portal leads into the building from the south wall, and another (now blocked off) was at the western wall. All of the walls, the horseshoe apse flanked by two rectangular chambers, two massive piers, and the southern aisle’s columns remain standing. At the west end a small portion of the vaulted ceiling remains, but much of it has since collapsed. During the 17th century the church was fortified by doubling the north and west walls in order to defend the structure, and above the southern wall a gun slot was erected. In 1815, the church was partially ruined. The south façade was supposedly rebuilt at one point. During 1963-64, restorations were done to the church which revealed walls, piers, arches, fragments of vaults, and a khachkar.

== Legend ==
According to a legend, three sisters lived in Ashtarak, all of whom fell in love with the same man, Prince Sargis. The elder two sisters decided to commit suicide in favor of the youngest one. One wearing an apricot-orange dress and the other wearing a red dress, they threw themselves into the gorge. When the youngest sister found out, she put on a white dress and also threw herself into the gorge. Sargis then became a hermit and three small churches appeared at the edge of the gorge, named after the sisters' dress colors.

== Gallery ==
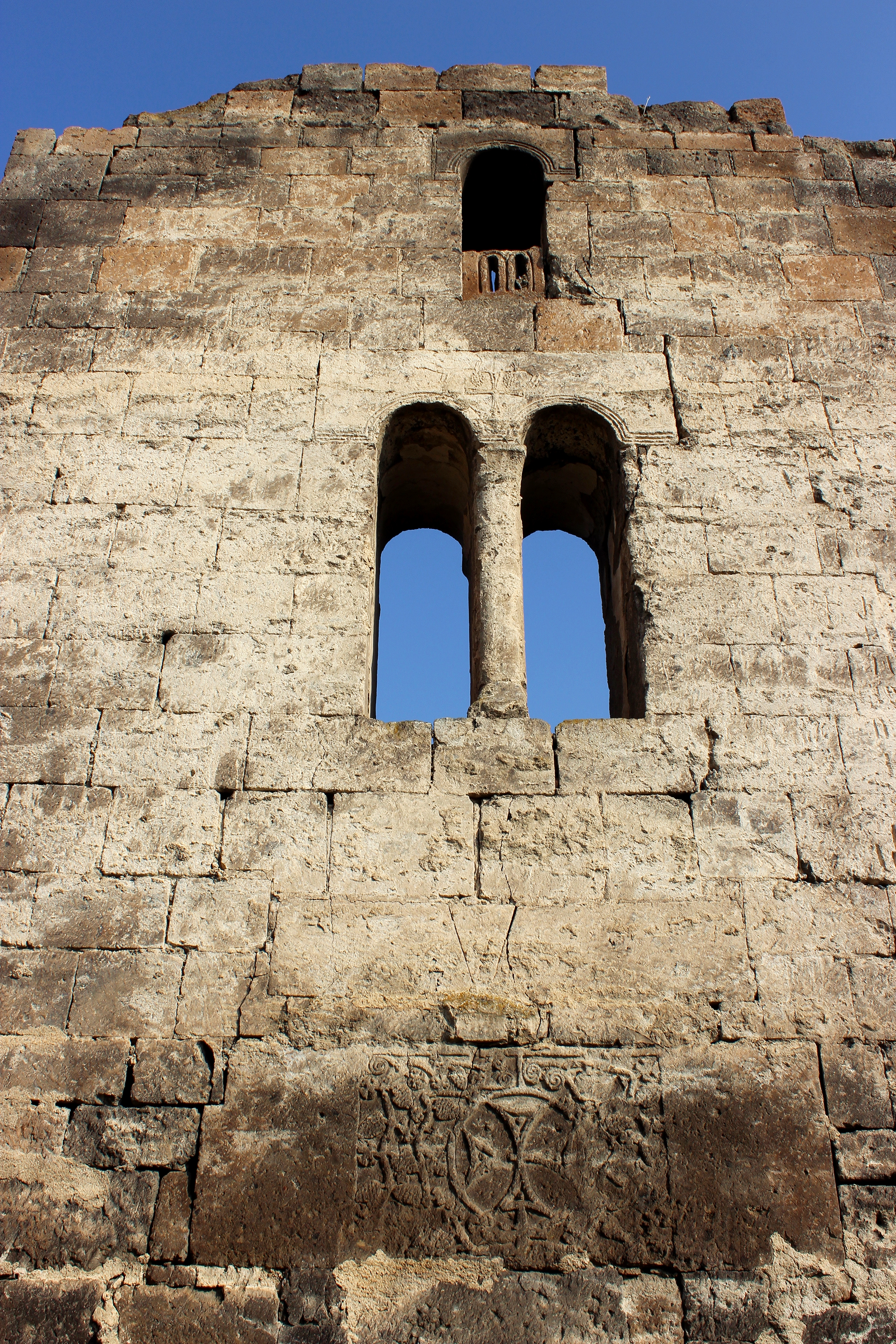
Detail of the front wall of the church.

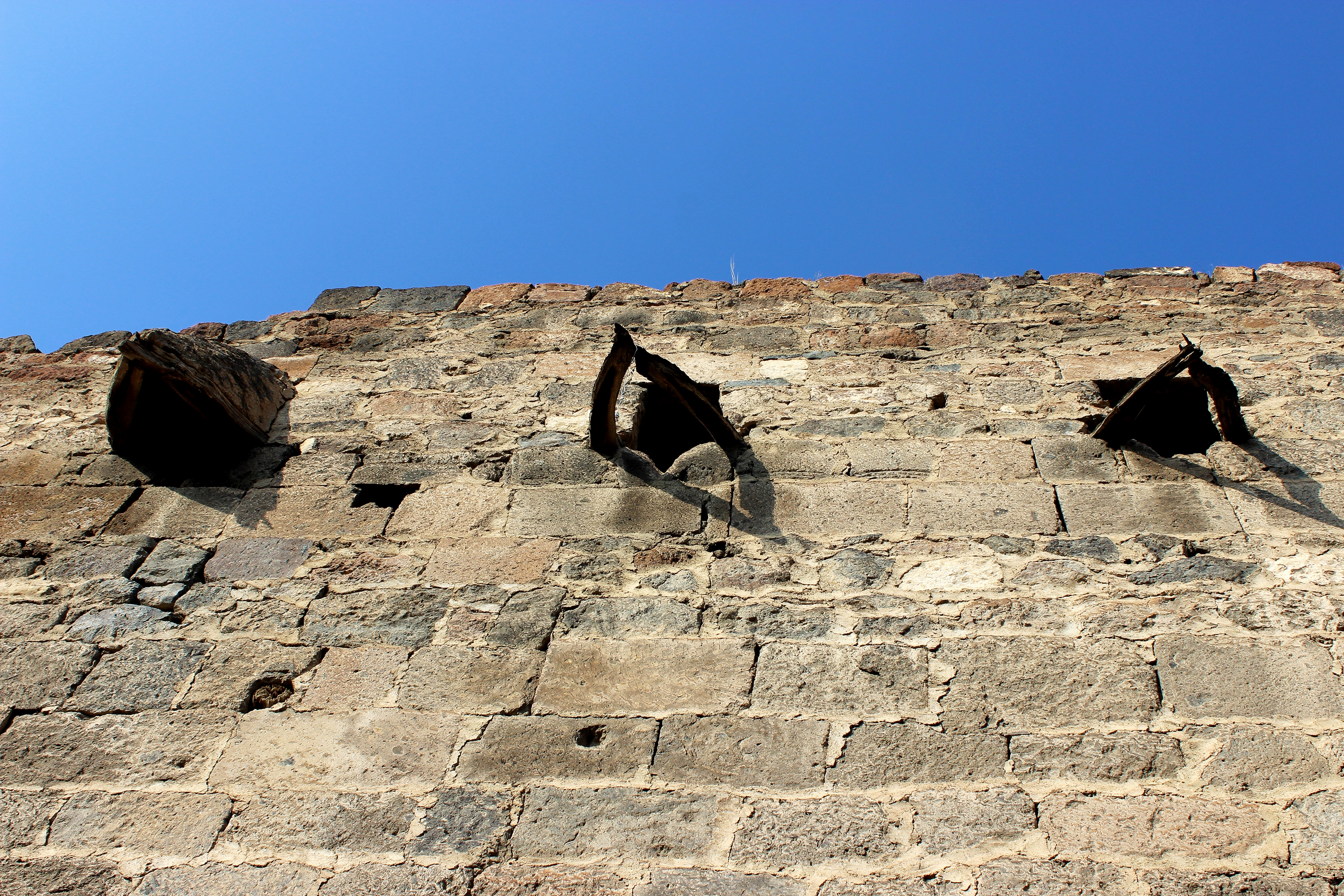
Upper wall fortifications.

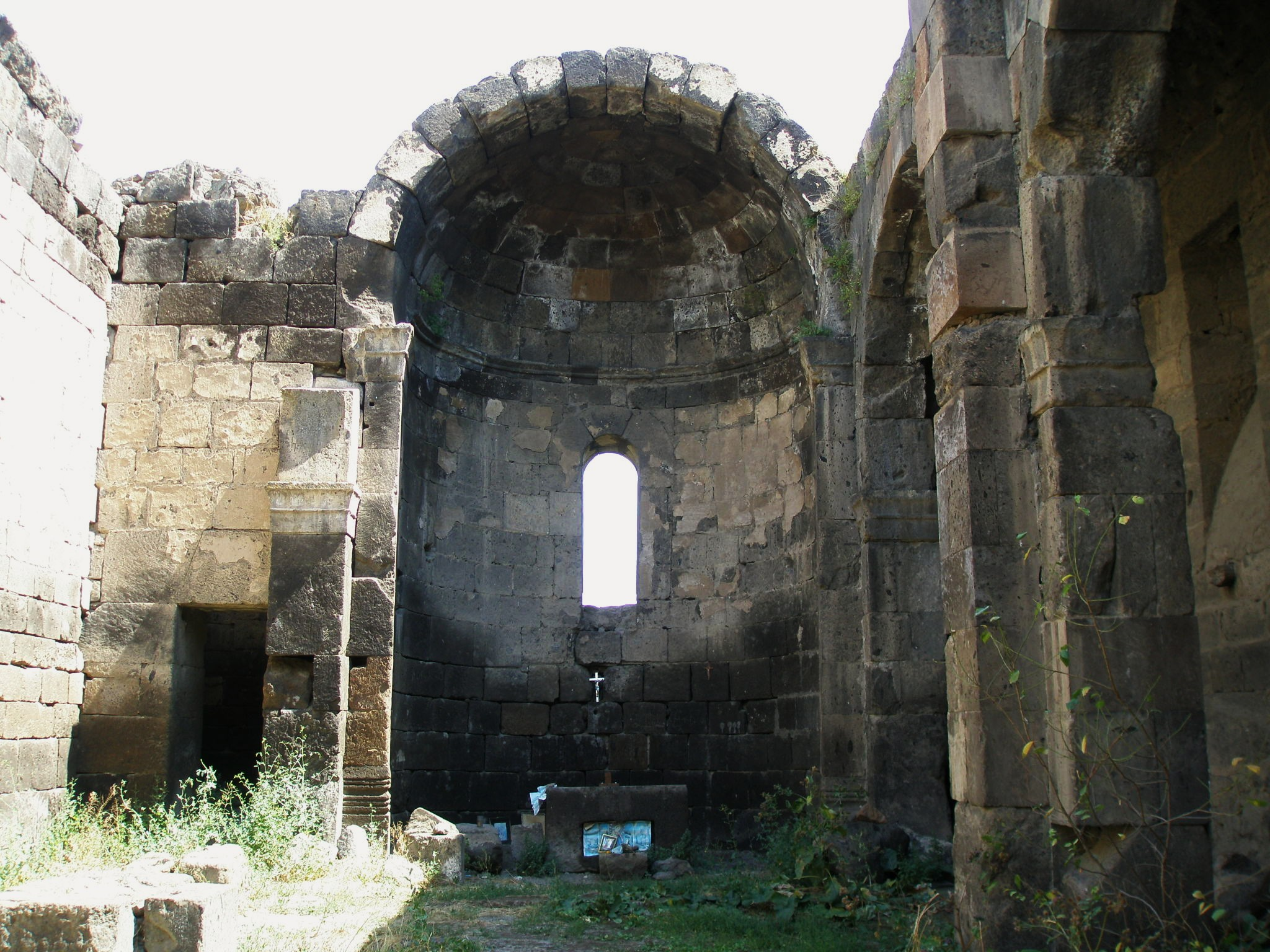
The apse at the east wall, a side chamber to the left, and to the right are the columns at the southern aisle.

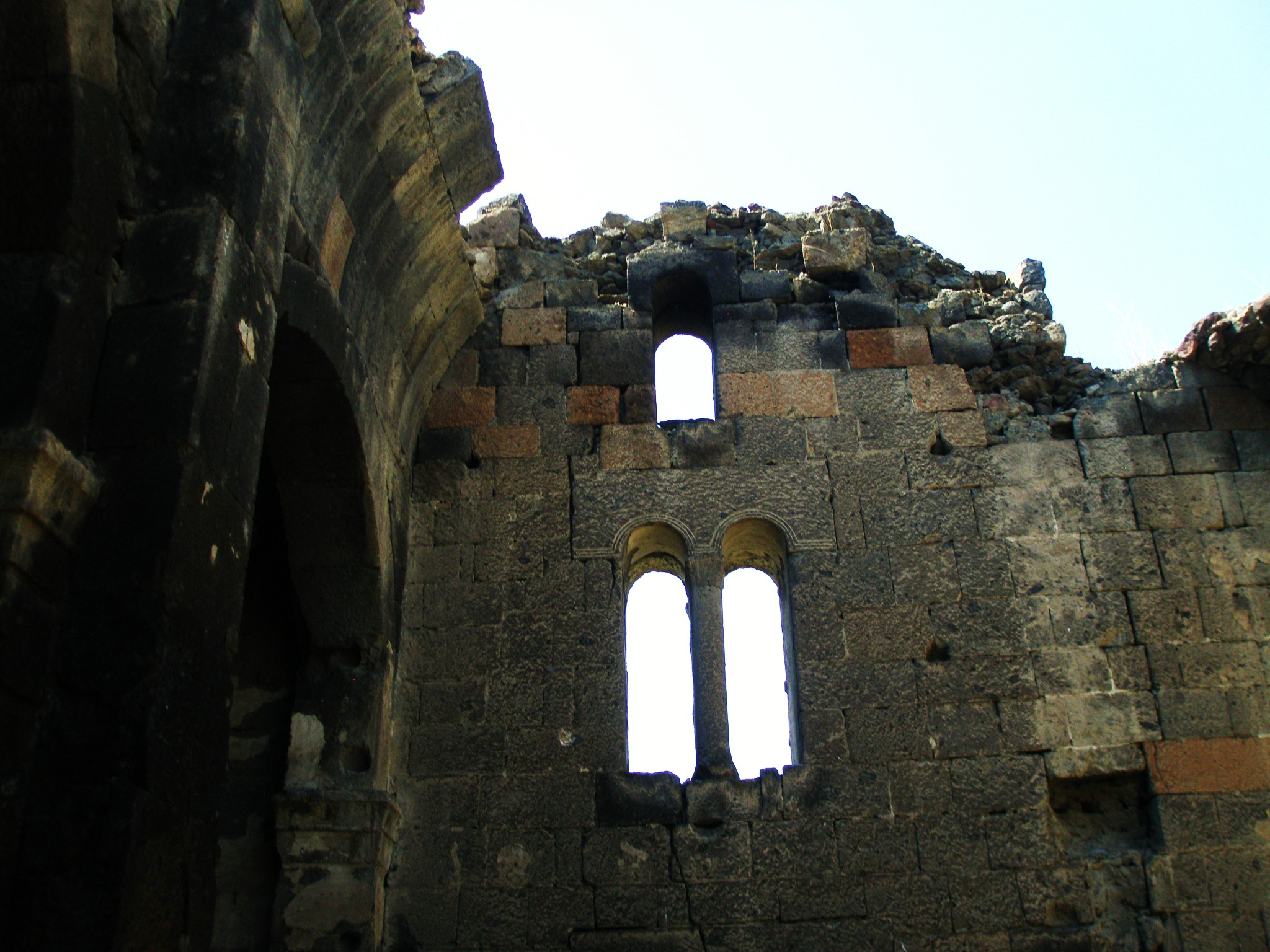
Remains of the vaulted ceiling resting above the southern aisle. Three windows may be also seen at the top of the west wall.
