= Saint Marianeh Church, Ashtarak =

Church in Ashtarak, Armenia

Saint Marianeh Church Սուրբ Մարիանե եկեղեցի
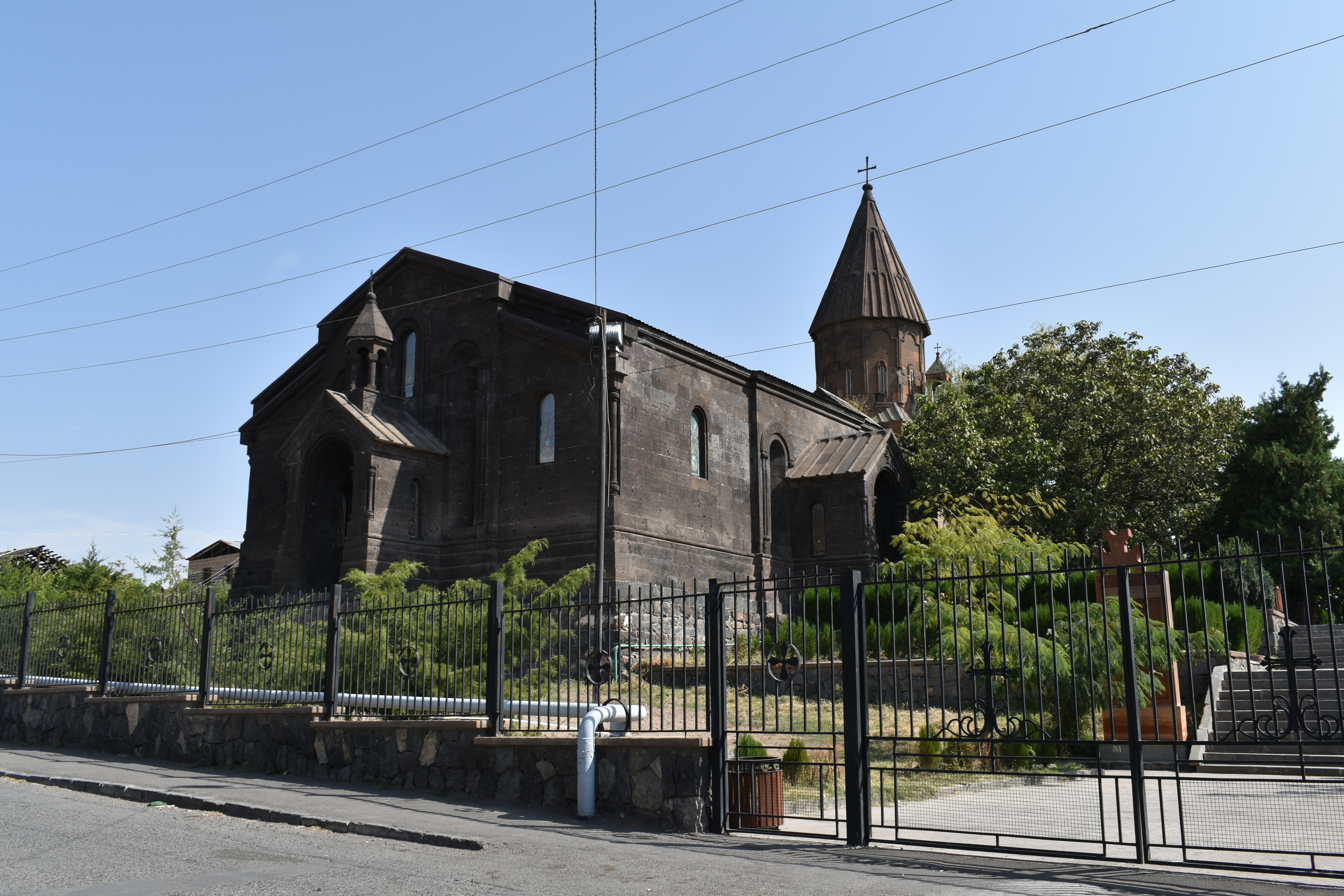
- Saint Marianeh Church in 2020

- Location within Armenia Location within Aragatsotn

Religion
- Affiliation: Armenian Apostolic Church

Location
- Location: Ashtarak, Aragatsotn Province, Armenia
- Coordinates: 40.300926°N 44.360996°E

Architecture
- Type: Cruciform central-plan inside; Rectangular plan outside
- Style: Armenian
- Completed: 1271

Specifications
- Length: Exterior 11,45 meters
- Width: Exterior 8,88 meters
- Dome: 1

Saint Marianeh church (Armenian: Սուրբ Մարիանե եկեղեցի; pronounced Surp Mariané), also known as Saint Marineh, is a medieval Armenian church located in the town of Ashtarak in the Aragatsotn Province of Armenia, currently serving as the alternative seat of the Diocese of Aragatsotn of the Armenian Apostolic Church. Nearby are the churches of Karmravor (located southeast of the Saint Marianeh), Spitakavor, Tsiranavor, and Surp Sarkis. There is also a unique bridge of 1664 in the gorge nearby. Saint Marianeh church is clearly visible from across the gorge at Saint Sargis church. The church sits adjacent to Smbat Shahaziz road, between Perch Proshyan and Parpetsi roads though it is easiest reached via a vacant lot southeast of the complex.

== Architecture ==
Saint Marianeh church was built in 1271 (according to some sources 1281), and has proportions peculiar to the given period of its construction. It has a rectangular plan from the exterior and a cruciform central-plan from the interior, and two-tiered side-chapels join the apse from the western and eastern sides. Of particular interest is the church's drum that is circular from the interior and decahedral from the exterior. A tall dome rests on top. Façades of the church, drum, and dome are simply adorned with cruciform decorations around the rectangular windows. The main portal into the structure is at the southern wall, with a belfry over this wing built in 1838. Another portal leads into the church from the western wall. Adjacent to the western wing of the church, is an unfinished 20th century basilica with the remainders of a fortified wall built of unprocessed blocks of basalt.
