= St. Sarkis Church (Ashtarak) =

Historical Armenian church

Saint Sarkis Church Սուրբ Սարգիս եկեղեցի
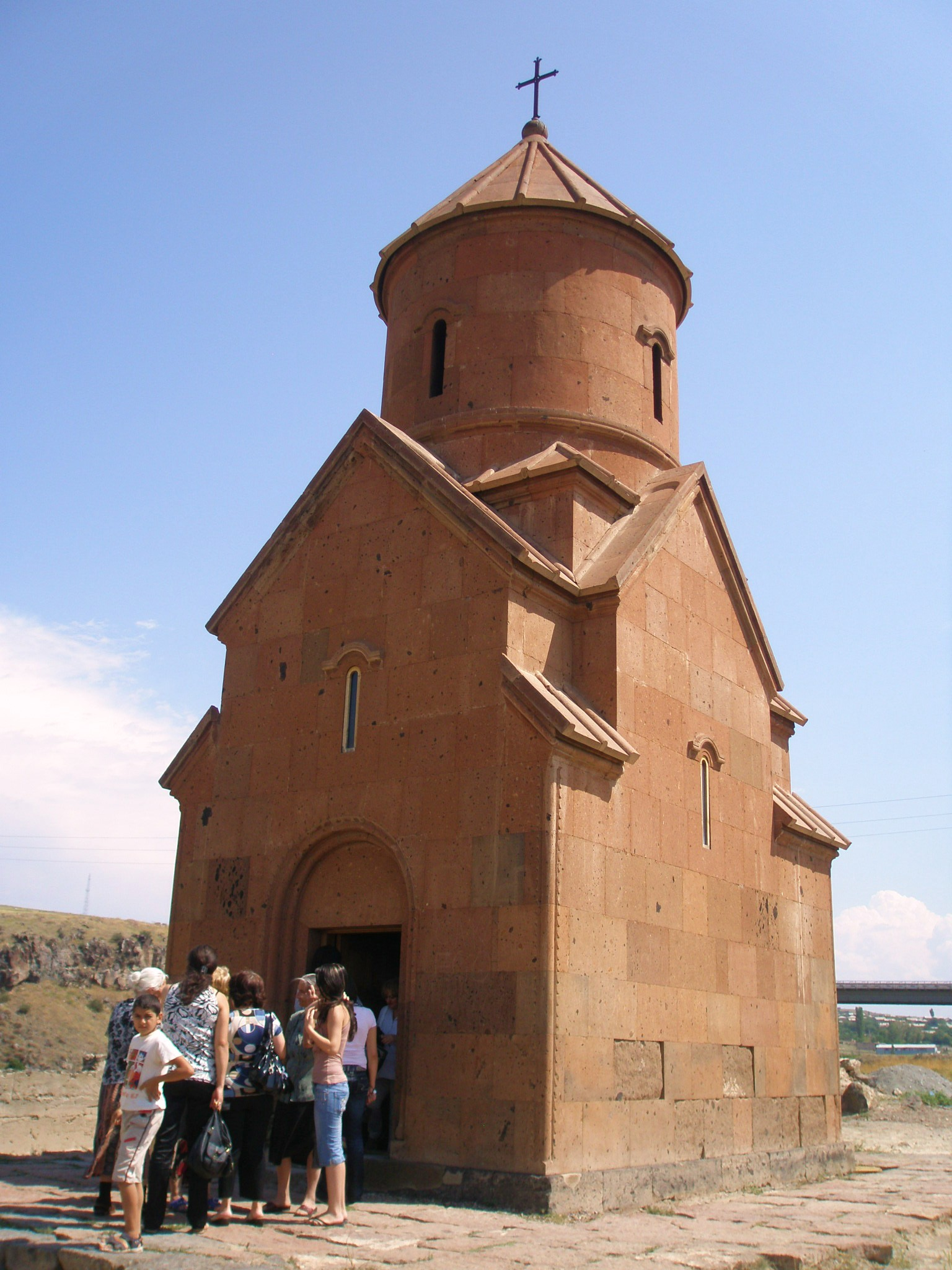
- Saint Sarkis Church, August 2009

- Location within Armenia Location within Aragatsotn

Religion
- Affiliation: Armenian Apostolic Church

Location
- Location: Ashtarak, Aragatsotn Province, Armenia
- Coordinates: 40.299628°N 44.365417°E

Architecture
- Type: Small cruciform central-plan
- Style: Armenian
- Completed: 17th century; Restored in the 19th century
- Dome: 1

The church of Saint Sarkis (Armenian: Սուրբ Սարգիս եկեղեցի; pronounced Surp Sarkis) is located at the edge of a gorge opposite the town of Ashtarak in the Aragatsotn Province of Armenia. It is situated at an attractive point at a promontory overlooking the gorge and offers a fine view to the three churches of Tsiranavor, Spitakavor, and Karmravor. Located in the center of town nearby is also the church of S. Mariane. Directly below Saint Sarkis in the gorge is a unique bridge built in 1664. A path leads down from the church into the gorge and across the bridge which leads to the town.

== Architecture ==
Saint Sarkis Church has a small cruciform central-plan supposedly built in the 19th century on an old foundation. A single drum and umbrella type dome rest on top of the church. Four small windows are located around the drum and upon the walls directly below at each of the four sides of the church. The interior stone has not been changed, yet the exterior façades have had extensive restoration work done recently. It looks to be a new church, but a small number of the older original stones carved with decorative relief and inscriptions (replaced with new stone and now sitting next to the foundation of the building) show its age to be much older.

== Gallery ==
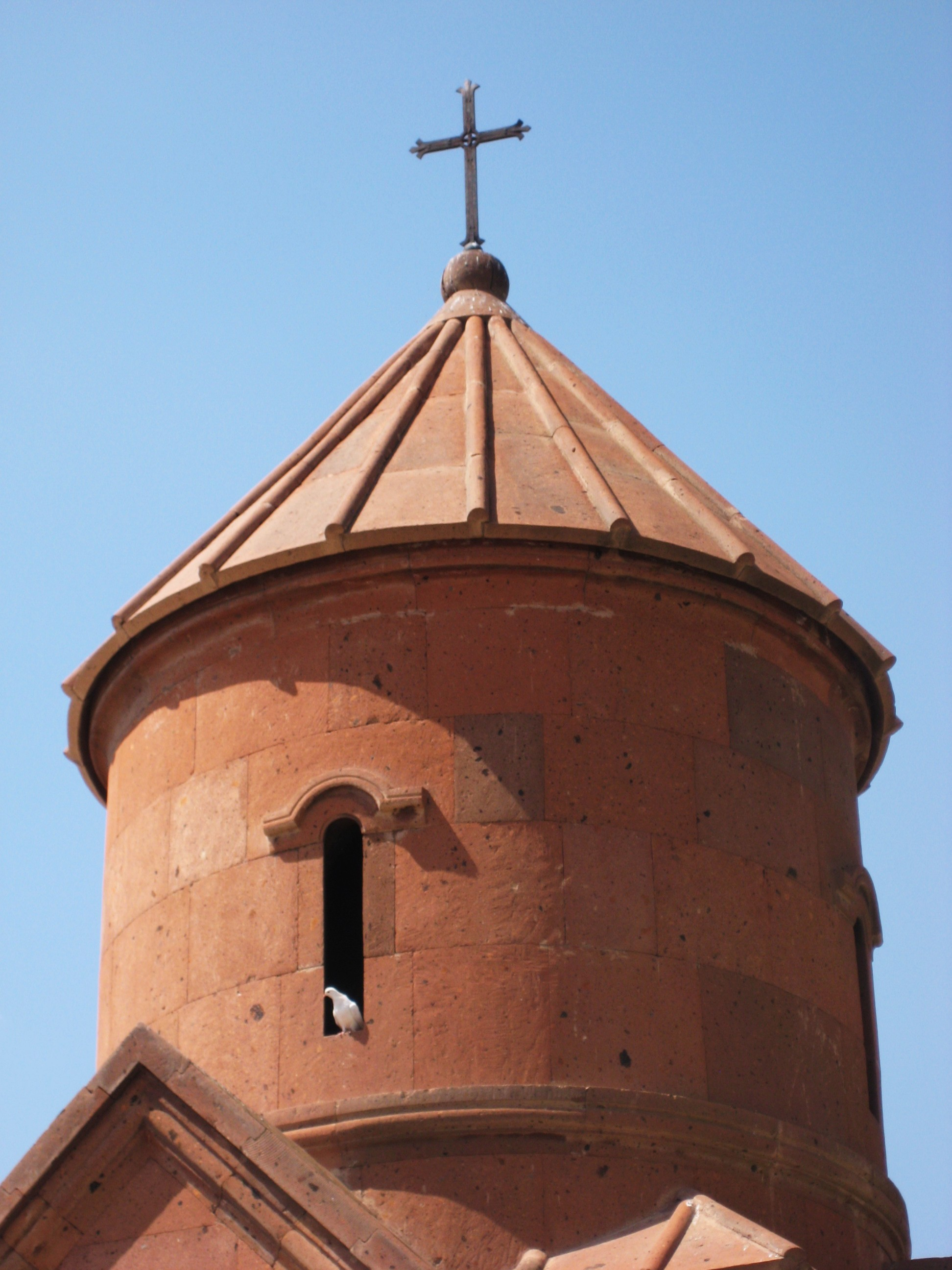
Dome of the Church

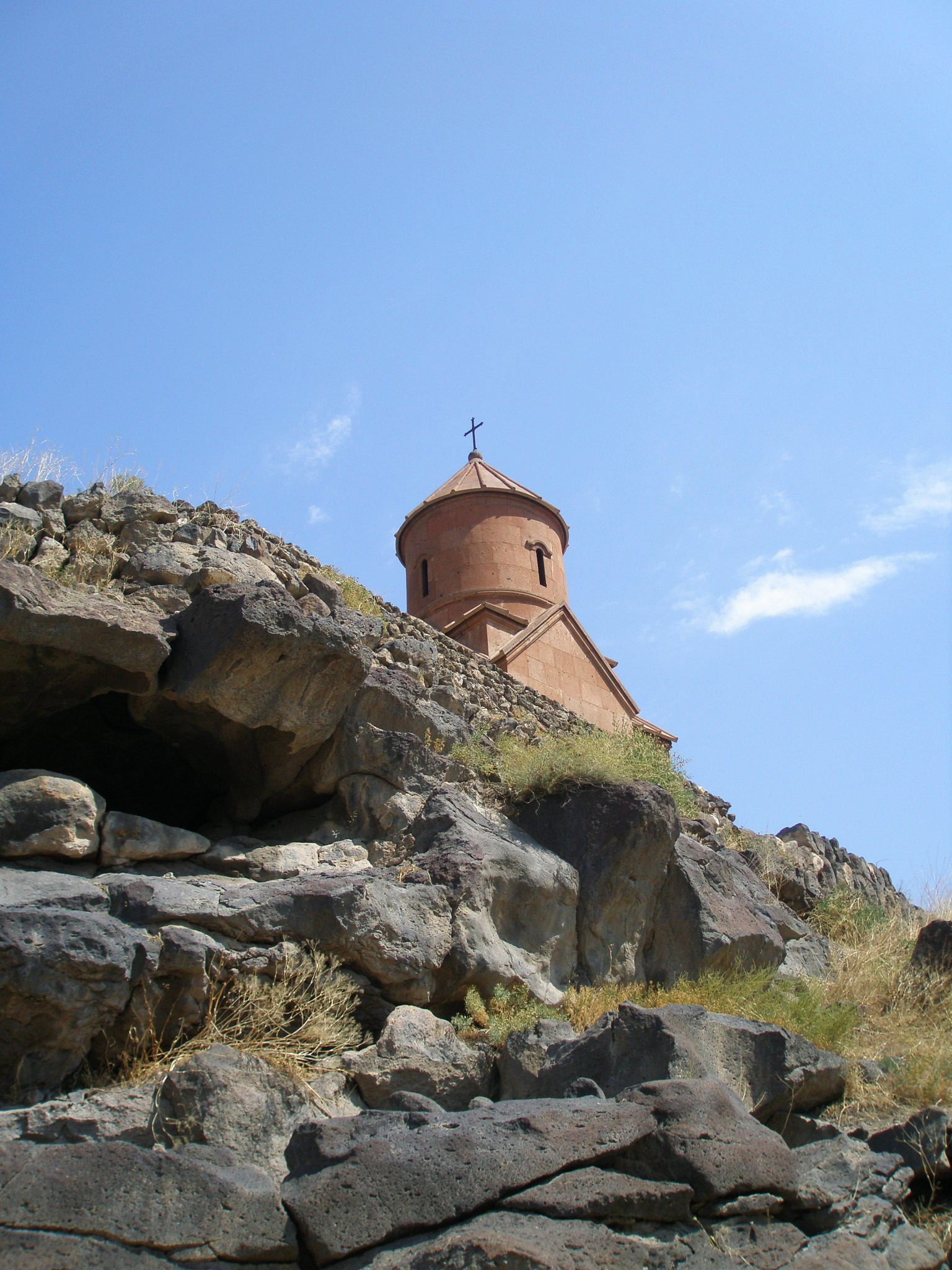
Church as seen from below
