= Ashtarak =

City in Aragatsotn, Armenia

Ashtarak Աշտարակ
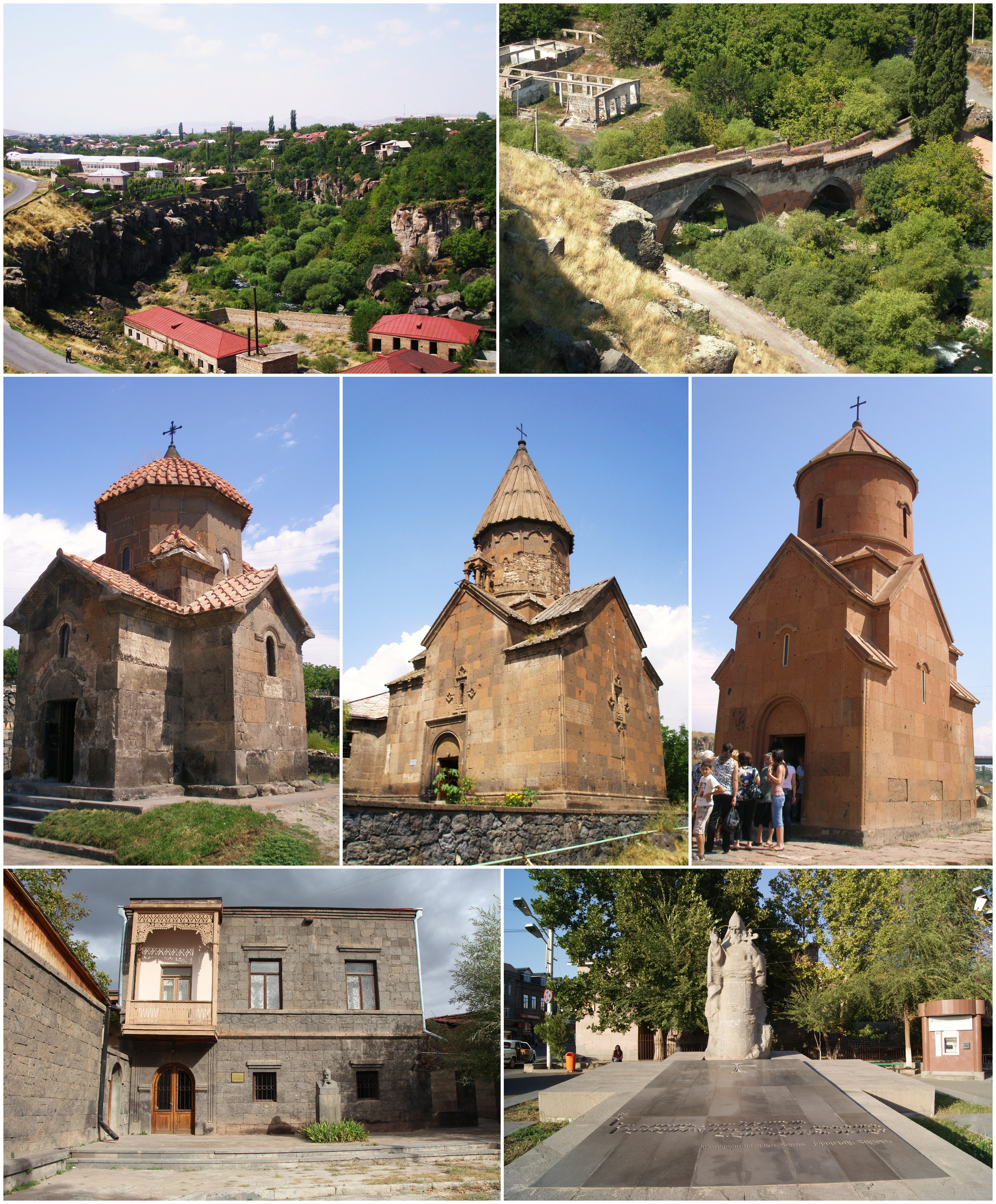
- From top left: Ashtarak town • Ashtarak bridge of 1664; Karmravor Church • Saint Marianeh Church • Surp Sarkis Church; House-museum of Perch Proshyan • the statue of Nerses Ashtaraketsi

- Flag Seal

- Location within Armenia Location within Aragatsotn
- Coordinates: 40°17′51″N 44°21′42″E
- Country: Armenia
- Province: Aragatsotn
- Municipality: Ashtarak
- First mentioned: 9th century
- City status: 1963

Government
  - Mayor: Tovmas Shahverdyan

Area
  - Total: 7.5 km^{2} (2.9 sq mi)
- Elevation: 1,110 m (3,640 ft)

Population (2022 census)
  - Total: 15,686
  - Density: 2,100/km^{2} (5,400/sq mi)
- Time zone: UTC+4 (AMT)
- Postal code: 0201-0205
- Area code: (+374) 232
- Website: ashtarak.am

Ashtarak (Armenian: Աշտարակ [ɑʃtɑˈɾɑk]) is a town in the Ashtarak Municipality of the Aragatsotn Province of Armenia, located on the left bank of Kasagh River along the gorge, 20 km northwest of the capital Yerevan. It is the administrative centre of the province and an important crossroad of routes for the Yerevan–Gyumri–Vanadzor triangle.

The town plays a great role in the national economy as well as the cultural life of Armenia through several industrial enterprises and cultural institutions. It has developed as a satellite town of Yerevan. The nearby village of Mughni is part of the Ashtarak municipality.

As of the 2011 census, the population of the town was 18,834. However, as per the 2016 official estimate, the population of Ashtarak is 18,000. As of the 2022 census, the population of the town was 15,686.

The prelacy of the Diocese of Aragatsotn of the Armenian Apostolic Church is headquartered in Ashtarak.

== Etymology ==
The name of Ashtarak is the Armenian word for tower or fortress. However, according to linguist Grigor Ghapantsyan, the name of Ashtarak is derived from Ishtar (Ashtar), the Assyrian and Babylonian goddess of fertility. Contrarily, the latest historical research proved that the name of Ishtar was never used in the Armenian mythology during the ancient times. Instead, the goddess of fertility was known as Shardi or Sardi in the ancient kingdom of Urartu, and later became known as Astghik among the Armenian monks.

Other linguists suggest that the name of Ashtarak is related either with the legendary figure in the Armenian history Shidar; the son of king Artavasdes I of Armenia, or with Sarduri II; the king of Urartu.

== History ==
=== Early history and Middle Ages ===
The Bronze Age necropolises of Nerkin and Verin Naver are located just outside of modern Ashtarak. Archaeologist Hakob Y. Simonyan believes that they were constructed by an Indo-European culture, potentially early Armenians.

According to Movses Khorenatsi, Armanak, the son of the patriarch and founder of the Armenian nation Hayk, along with his clan, settled in the area of modern-day Aragatsotn.

Historically, the area of modern-day Ashtarak was part of the Aragatsotn canton of Ayrarat province of the ancient Kingdom of Armenia. The town is one of the oldest settlements in Armenia with many historical and cultural monuments that demonstrate the unique aspects of Armenian architecture.

In the history of the Armenian highland, Ashtarak was mentioned as a rural settlement for the first time during the 9th century. However, the importance of Ashtarak has declined during the following centuries under the rule of the foreign powers. Between the 11th and 15th centuries, the entire region of Aragatsotn along with the rest of the historic territories of Armenia suffered from the Seljuk, Mongol, Ag Qoyunlu and Kara Koyunlu invasions, respectively.

=== Modern history ===
At the beginning of the 16th century, Ahtarak became part of the Erivan Beglarbegi within the Safavid Persia. During the 17th century, the town was entirely rebuilt. During the first half of the 18th century, Ashtarak became part of the Erivan Khanate under the rule of the Afsharid dynasty and later under the Qajar dynasty of Persia. Ashtarak was the site of the Battle of Oshakan in August 1827, which resulted in a Persian victory, during the Russo-Persian War of 1826-1828. It remained under the Persian rule until 1827–1828, when Eastern Armenia was ceded to the Russian Empire as a result of the same Russo-Persian War of 1826–28 and the signing of the Treaty of Turkmenchay.

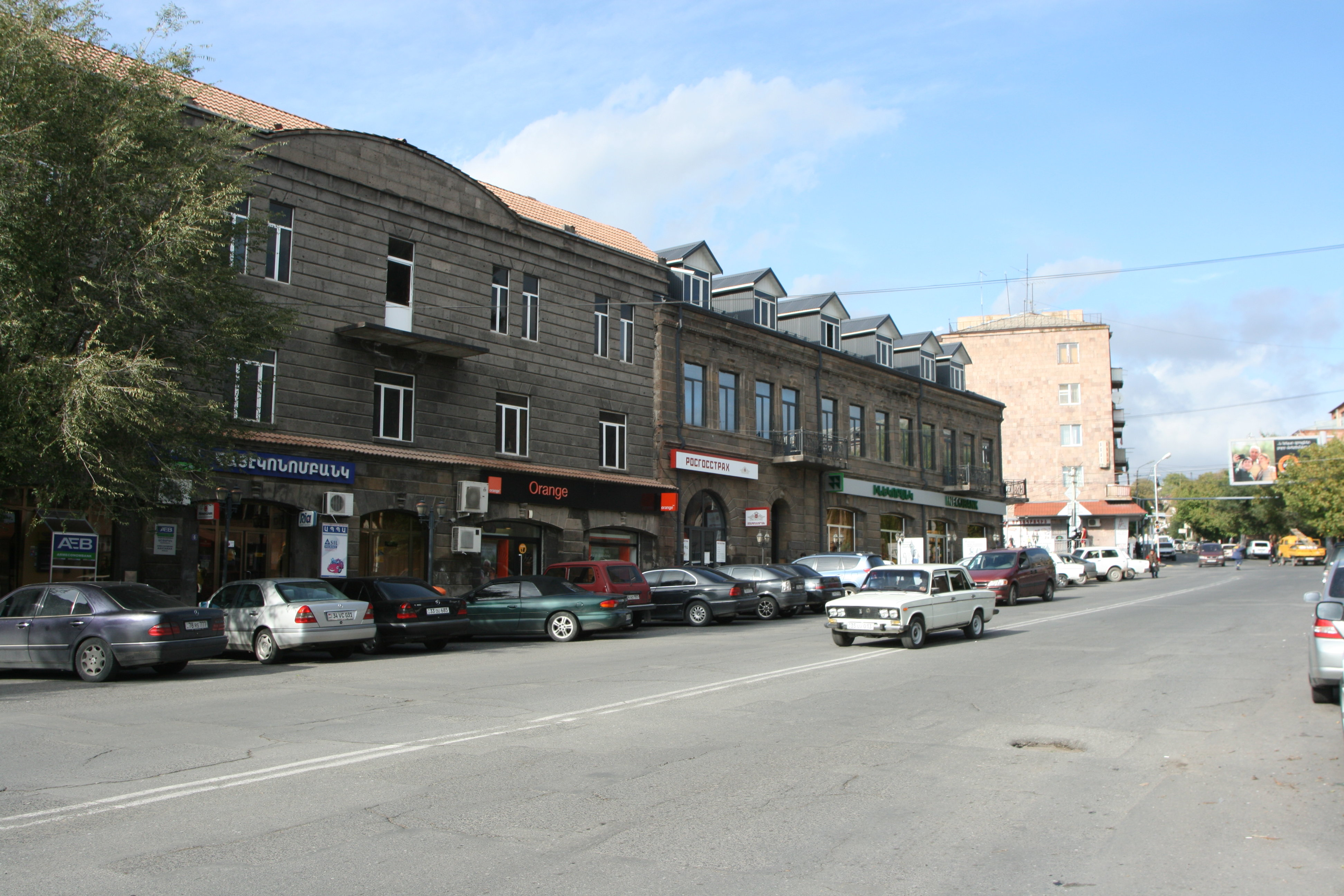
Downtown Ashtarak

After the fall of the Russian Empire in 1917, Ashtarak was included within the First Republic of Armenia declared on 28 May 1918. However, after 2 years of brief independence, Armenia became part of the Soviet Union in December 1920. From 1930 until 1995, Ashtarak was the centre of the Ashtarak raion. During that period, Ashtarak was granted the status of a town in 1963.

After the independence of Armenia in 1991, Ashtarak became the capital of the newly-formed Aragatsotn Province as a result of the territorial administration reform of 1995.

== Geography ==
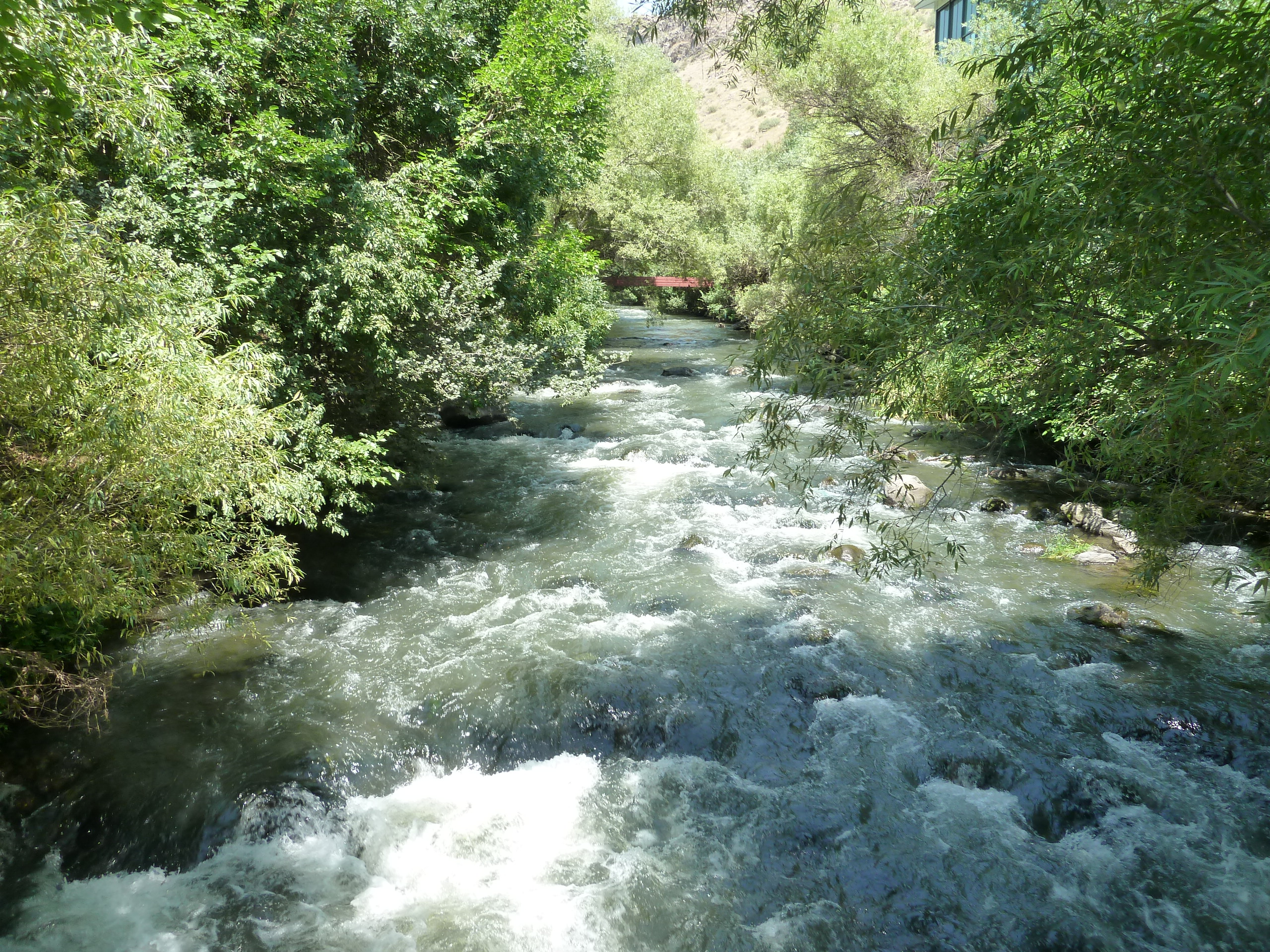
Kasagh River in Ashtarak

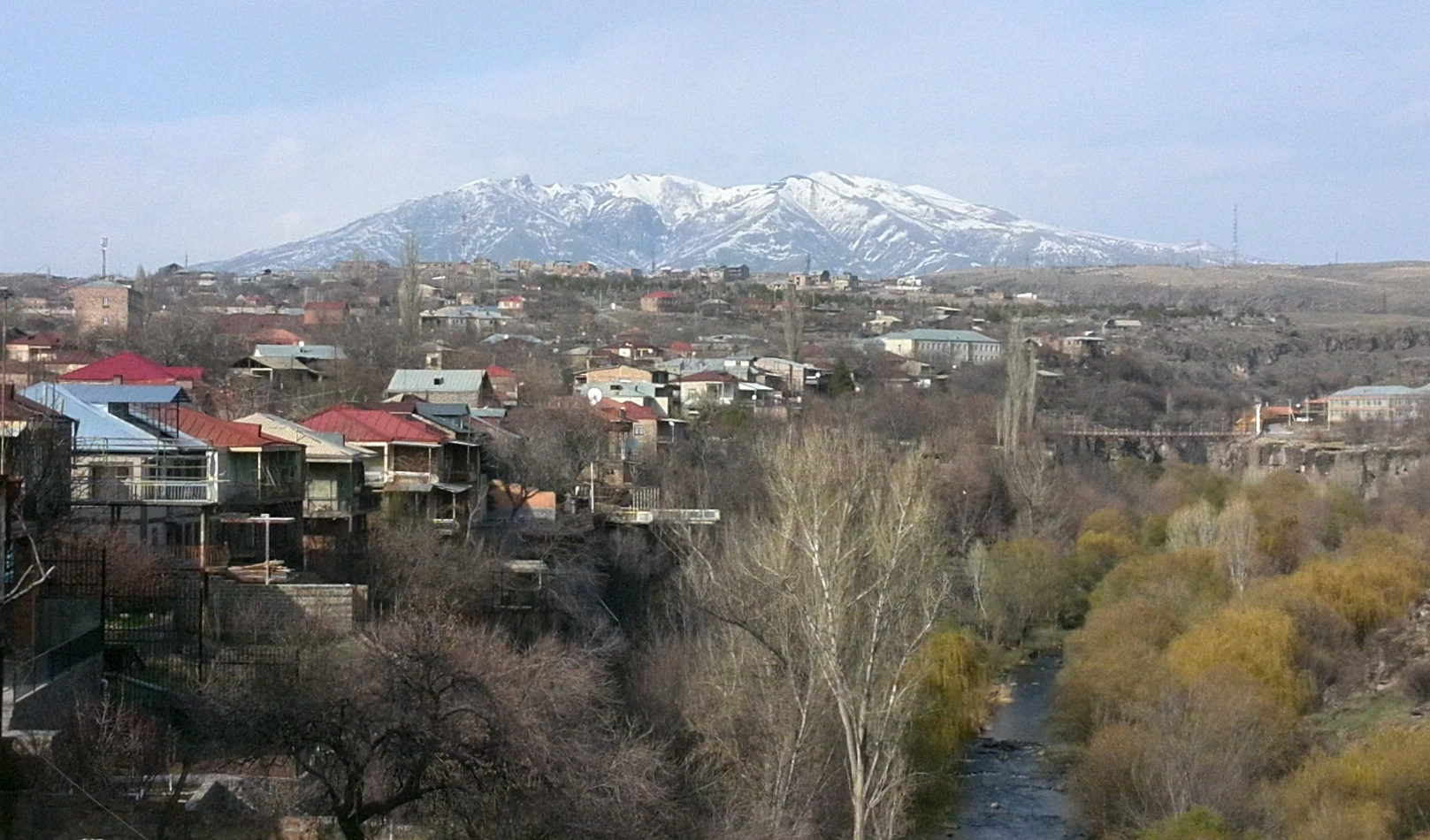
Mount Ara overlooking Ashtarak

Ashtarak is located on the left bank of Kasagh River, 13 km to the northwest of the capital Yerevan, at an approximate height of 1110 meters above sea level.

The town occupies the central point between the Ararat plain from the south and the mountains of Aragats from the north. The area is rich with water resources. The fountains of Saghmosavan, Nazrevan and Shroshor are the main sources of drinking water for the town.

The town is divided into 4 districts: Old Ashtarak on the right bank of Kasagh river, Dzakhap (literally meaning left bank) on the left side of Kasagh, Gitavan and Bagavan. The village of Mughni -included within the municipality of Ashtarak- is located to the north of the town. The valley of Ashtarak commonly known as Ashtaraki dzor is a major destination for visitors from Yerevan and other nearby settlements.

=== Climate ===
Ashtarak has a hot-summer humid continental climate (Köppen climate classification Dsa). The city has a hot and dry weather in summers, especially in August and September, the driest months. Spring is the wettest time of the year. Hail is a rare event which can happen in warmer months.

Climate data for Ashtarak
| Month | Jan | Feb | Mar | Apr | May | Jun | Jul | Aug | Sep | Oct | Nov | Dec | Year |
|---|---|---|---|---|---|---|---|---|---|---|---|---|---|
| Record high °C (°F) | 12.2 (54.0) | 17.5 (63.5) | 24.4 (75.9) | 32.5 (90.5) | 32.2 (90.0) | 39.0 (102.2) | 41.0 (105.8) | 41.2 (106.2) | 38.0 (100.4) | 31.0 (87.8) | 24.0 (75.2) | 19.5 (67.1) | 41.2 (106.2) |
| Daily mean °C (°F) | −2.8 (27.0) | 0.1 (32.2) | 6.1 (43.0) | 11.8 (53.2) | 16.4 (61.5) | 21.8 (71.2) | 25.5 (77.9) | 25.7 (78.3) | 20.9 (69.6) | 14.0 (57.2) | 6.1 (43.0) | −0.3 (31.5) | 12.1 (53.8) |
| Record low °C (°F) | −22.5 (−8.5) | −17.8 (0.0) | −11.0 (12.2) | −9.0 (15.8) | 1.0 (33.8) | 5.5 (41.9) | 6.8 (44.2) | 10.0 (50.0) | 3.0 (37.4) | −1.0 (30.2) | −10.5 (13.1) | −21.5 (−6.7) | −22.5 (−8.5) |
| Average precipitation mm (inches) | 27.6 (1.09) | 29.4 (1.16) | 35.8 (1.41) | 58.7 (2.31) | 60.2 (2.37) | 32.2 (1.27) | 21.2 (0.83) | 12.1 (0.48) | 16.0 (0.63) | 34.6 (1.36) | 30.4 (1.20) | 30.2 (1.19) | 388.4 (15.3) |
| Average precipitation days (≥ 1.0 mm) | 5.4 | 5.4 | 6.6 | 9.3 | 10.5 | 6.2 | 4 | 2.5 | 2.8 | 6.2 | 4.8 | 6.1 | 69.8 |
| Average relative humidity (%) | 80.7 | 72.6 | 65 | 66.1 | 67.3 | 58.8 | 56.8 | 55.4 | 58.7 | 68.2 | 73.3 | 81.9 | 67.1 |
| Mean monthly sunshine hours | 89.9 | 117.3 | 153 | 182 | 238.6 | 310.8 | 340.6 | 325.7 | 278.9 | 208.3 | 151.2 | 82.9 | 2,479.2 |
Source: NOAA

== Demographics ==
Historical population
| Year | Pop. | ±% p.a. |
|---|---|---|
| 1831 | 826 | — |
| 1891 | 2,550 | +1.90% |
| 1914 | 4,867 | +2.85% |
| 1926 | 4,853 | −0.02% |
| 1959 | 7,563 | +1.35% |
| 1972 | 13,900 | +4.79% |
| 2001 | 20,636 | +1.37% |
| 2011 | 18,834 | −0.91% |
| 2022 | 15,686 | −1.65% |

== Culture ==
Ashtarak has a cultural palace, 4 schools of art, and many public libraries, including the Aragatsotn regional library named after Vardges Petrosyan. The town is also home to the house-museum of novelist Perch Proshyan founded in 1948, located at the centre of town within the Proshyan family house. It was last restored in 2008. The 17th-century bridge of Ashtarak on Kasagh River is among the interesting sites of the town. It is located in the gorge just below the church of Saint Sarkis. It was built in 1664 by the efforts of Mahdesi Khoja Grigor; a wealthy merchant from Kanaker. The bridge features 3 arches that are unequal in size.

=== Historical monuments ===
==== Churches of Spitakavor, Karmravor and Tsiranavor ====
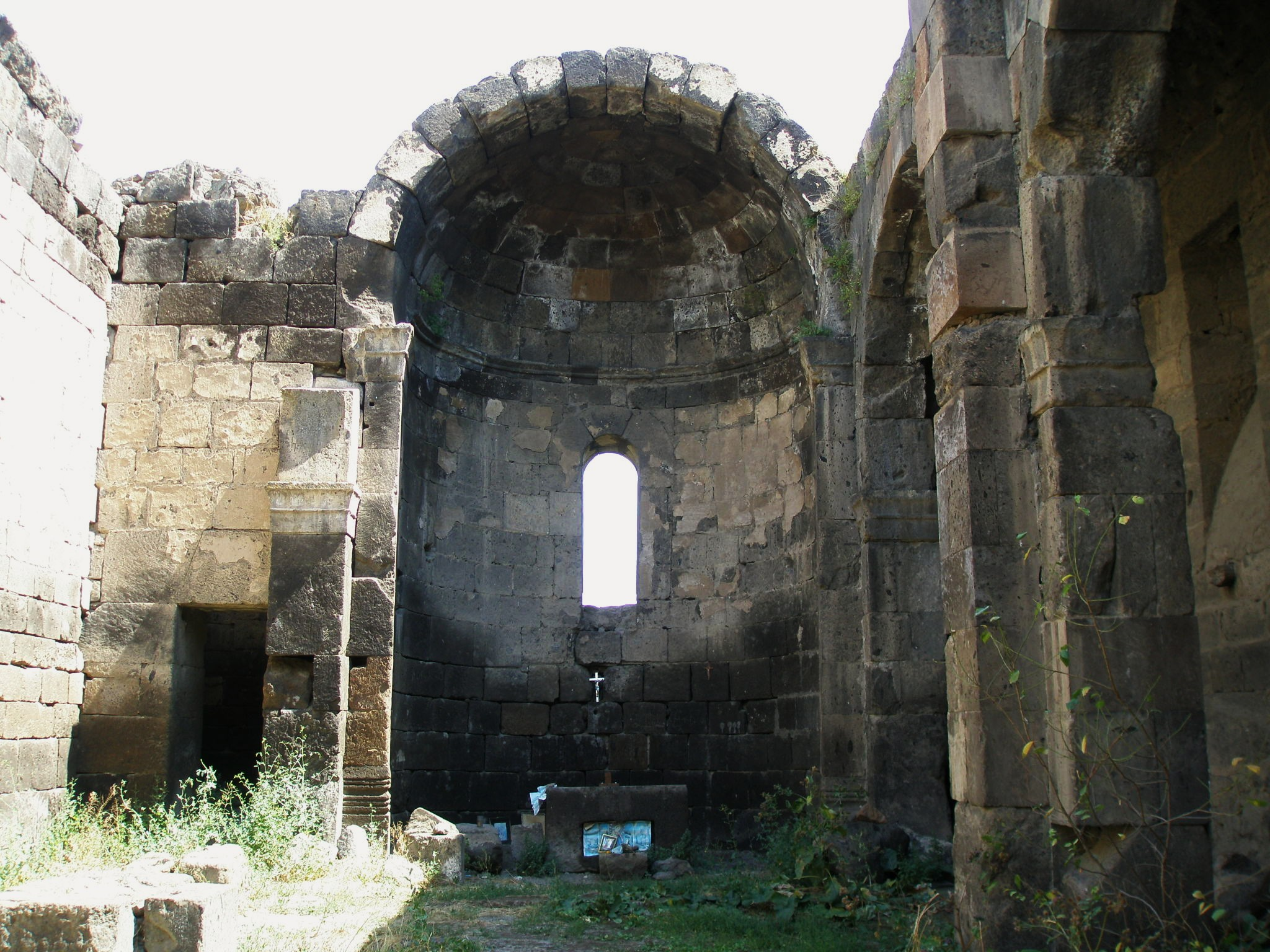
The remains of Tsiranavor Church, 5th century

According to a legend, 3 sisters lived in Ashtarak, all of whom fell in love with the same man, prince Sarkis. The elder 2 sisters decided to commit suicide in favour of the youngest one. One wearing an apricot-orange dress and the other wearing a red dress, they threw themselves into the Ashtarak gorge. When the youngest sister found out, she put on a white dress and also threw herself into the gorge. Sarkis then became a hermit and three small churches appeared at the edge of the gorge, named after the sisters' dress colours.

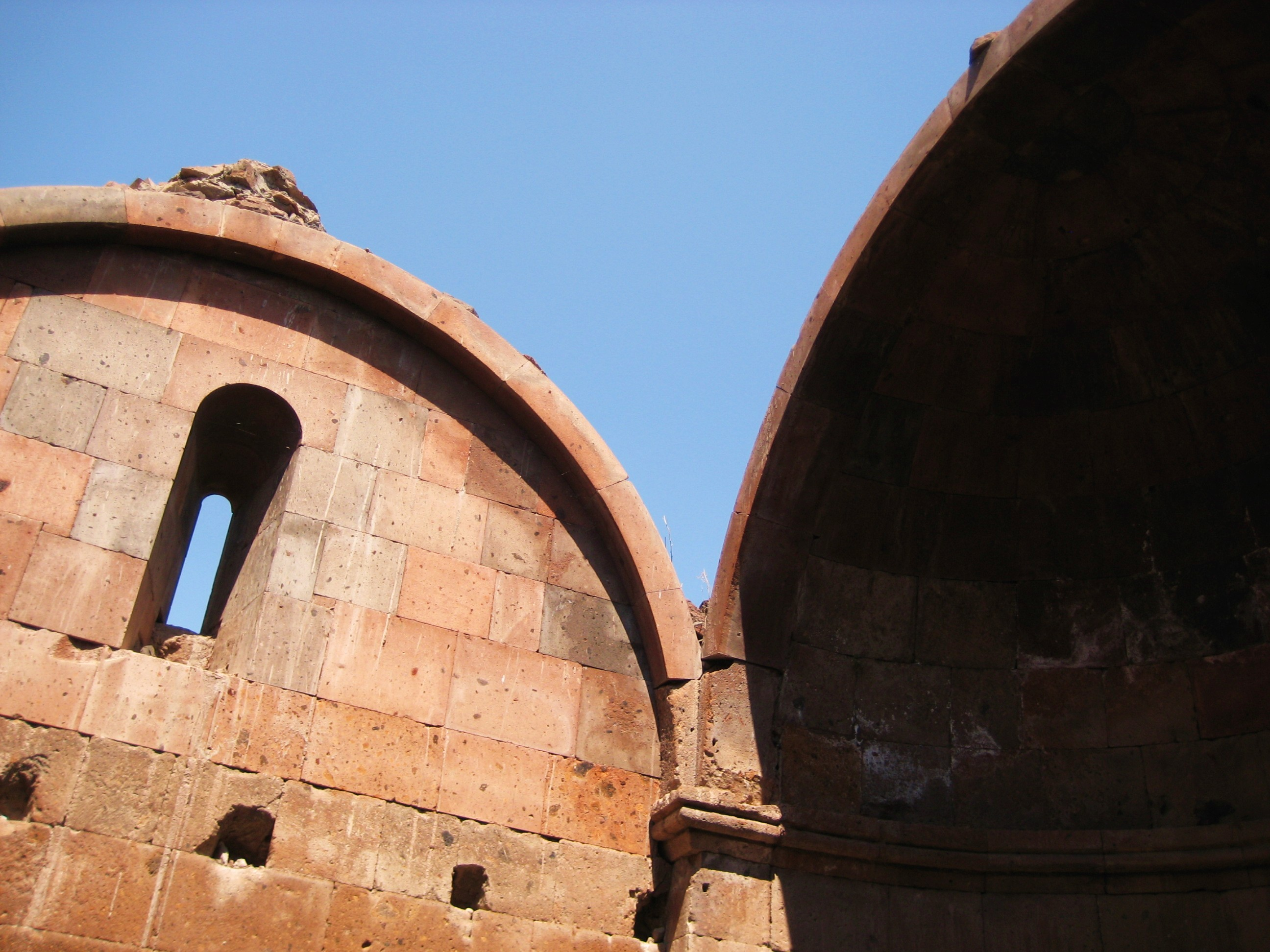
The remains of Spitakavor Church, 13th century

The best preserved one among the three churches is the Karmravor Church (meaning reddish for its dome colour), dating back to the 7th century, dedicated to the Holy Mother of God (Surp Astvatsatsin). It has a small cruciform central-plan, with a reddish/apricot colored dome, and an octagonal drum. Other churches include, Tsiranavor (meaning apricot-colored) dating back to the 5th century, and Spitakavor (meaning whitish) dating back to the 13th century, both are located along the edge of the gorge.

==== Saint Marianeh Church ====
The largest church of the town is the Saint Marianeh Church located at the center of Ashtarak. It was built in 1271 and has a rectangular plan from outside and a cruciform type plan from inside with an octagonal drum above. A belfry was added in 1838.

==== Saint Sarkis Church ====
The 19th-century church of Surp Sarkis built on an old foundation, is situated on an attractive point at a promontory overlooking the gorge and offers a fine view to the above-mentioned three churches. The external walls of the structure were almost completely restored recently while the interior walls remain the same. Some pieces of the outer walls remain sitting next to the church with carvings on them.

=== Ashtarak Walnut Festival ===
The Ashtarak Walnut Festival is taking place every year during the month of October to promote the fame of the delicious walnut of Ashtarak. It was first celebrated in 2012. The festival is organized by the French-Armenian owners of the local Pascal & Diodato café.

== Transportation ==
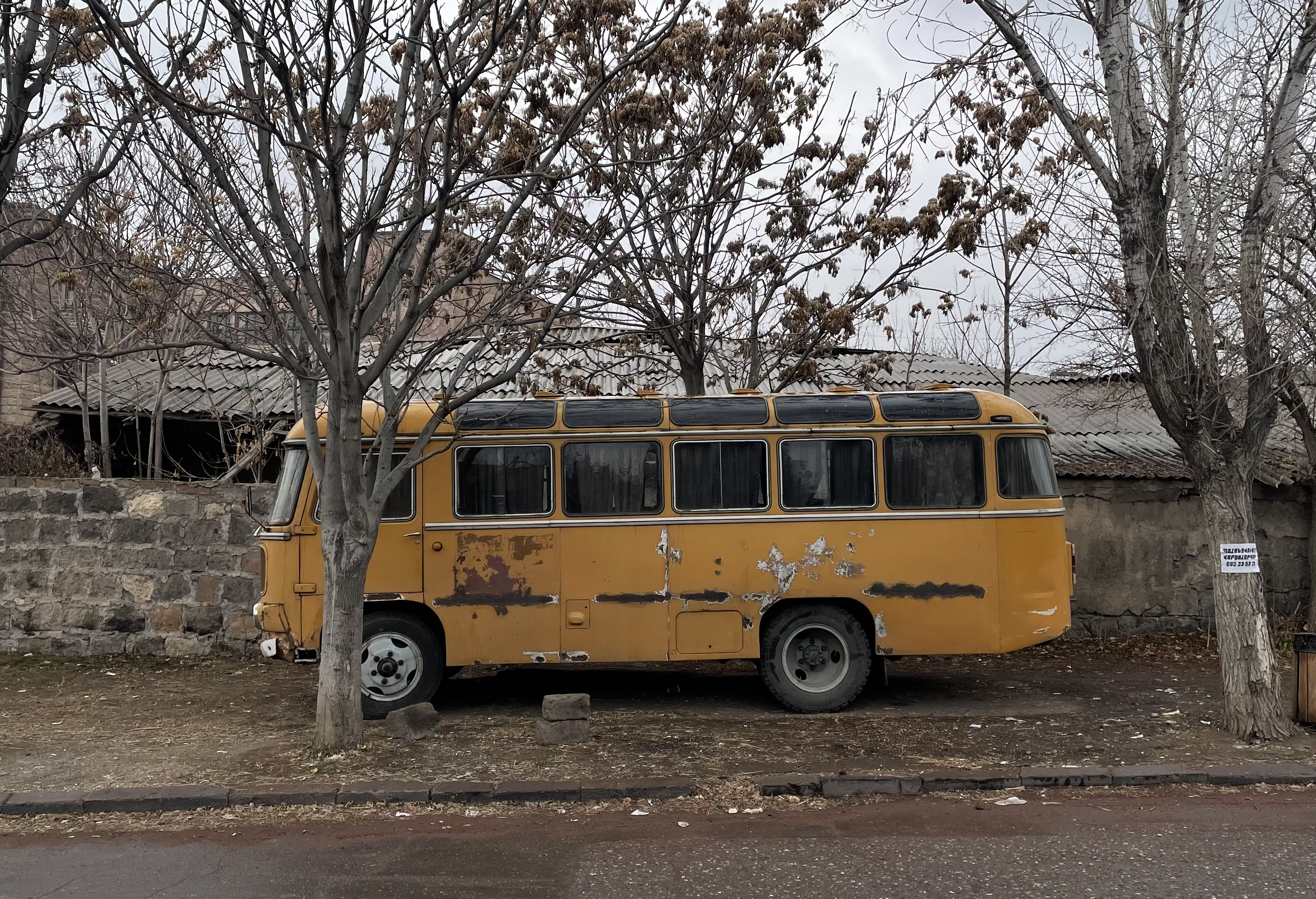
Soviet-era PAZ-672 bus in Ashtarak

Ashtarak is a satellite of Yerevan and connected with the capital through the Ashtarak highway. The M-1 Motorway connects Ashtarak with northwestern Armenia, including the city of Gyumri, while the M-3 Motorway connects the town with northeastern Armenia up to the Georgian border.

Taxi services are available in the town while public vans locally-known as marshrutka, operate regular trips between Ashtarak and Yerevan throughout the day.

== Economy ==
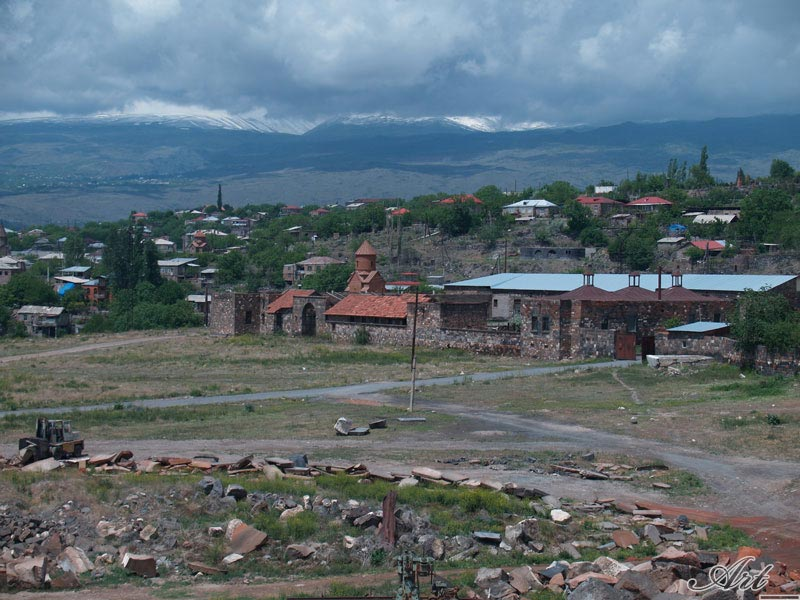
View of Ashtarak

Ashtarak is one of the major industrial centre of Aragatsotn Province. The industrial sector of the town is based on food-processing, dairy products and beverages, mainly processing the domestic raw materials and grapes.

Ashtarak is home to the "Ashtarak-Kat" company (founded in 1995), the leading ice-cream and dairy products manufacturer in Armenia. The town is also home to the "Gourmet Dourme" chocolate factory founded in 2007, the "P & D Group Armenia" for plastic containers founded in 2007, as well as the "Milen Art" plant and the "Kharam Cooperative" for building materials production.

With several restaurants and recreation areas, the valley of Kasagh river -locally known as Ashtaraki dzor- is a major destination for visitors from Yerevan and other areas.

== Education ==
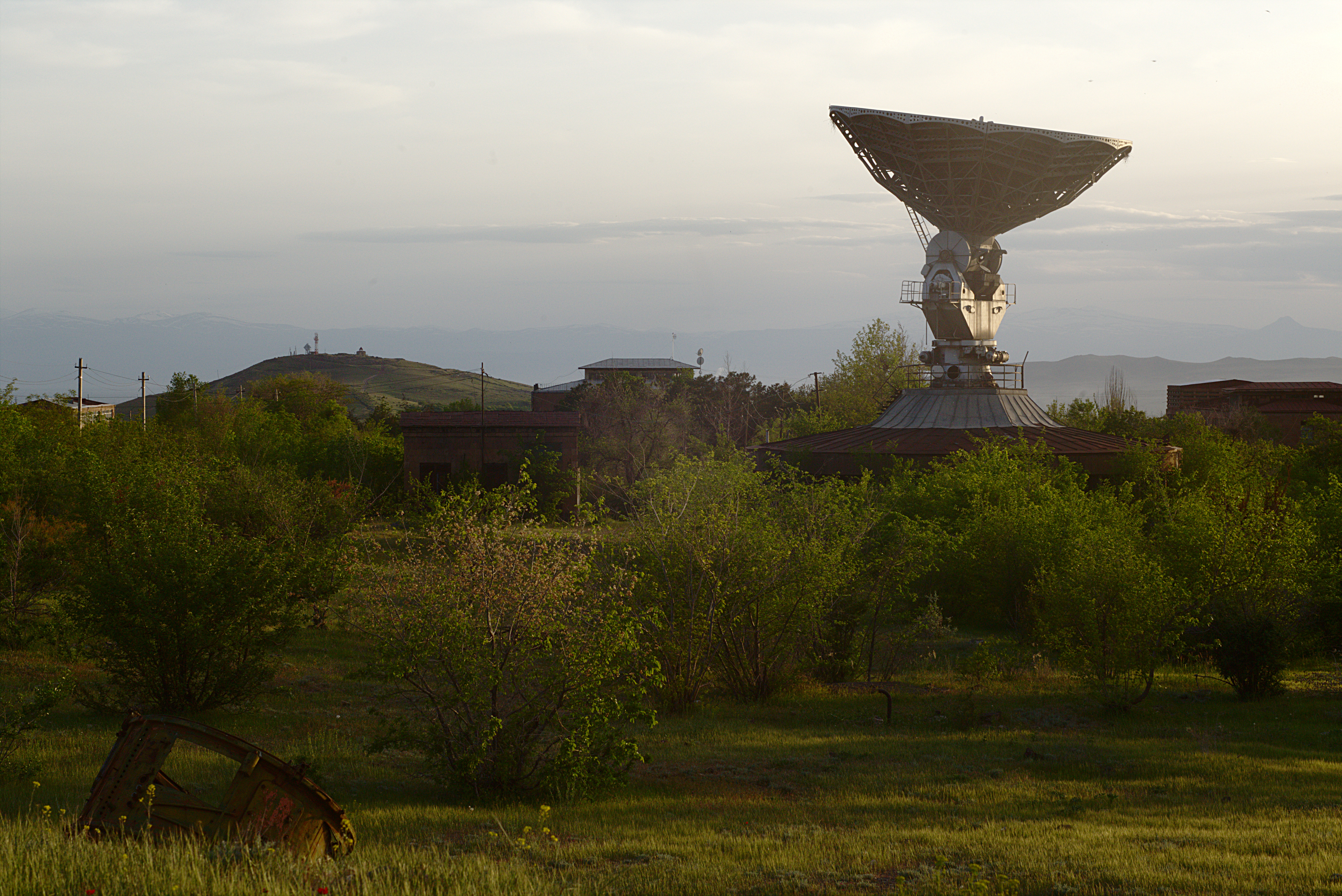
Radio telescope at the Ashtarak Institute of Radiophysics and Electronics

Ashtarak is home to 7 public education schools and 6 pre-school kindergartens. It is also home to the Ashtarak State Vocational School, which is an intermediate technical college.

2 major scientific research institutions of Armenia are based in Ashtarak:

- Institute of Radiophysics and Electronics: founded in 1960 as the research and development branch of the Armenian National Academy of Sciences, in the fields of radio engineering, automatic control, theoretical physics, solid state physics, semiconductors and superconductivity.
- Mikael Ter-Mikaelian Institute for Physical Research: founded in 1967 as the physical research organization of the National Academy of Sciences, involved in the fields of laser physics, material science and related areas.

== Sport ==
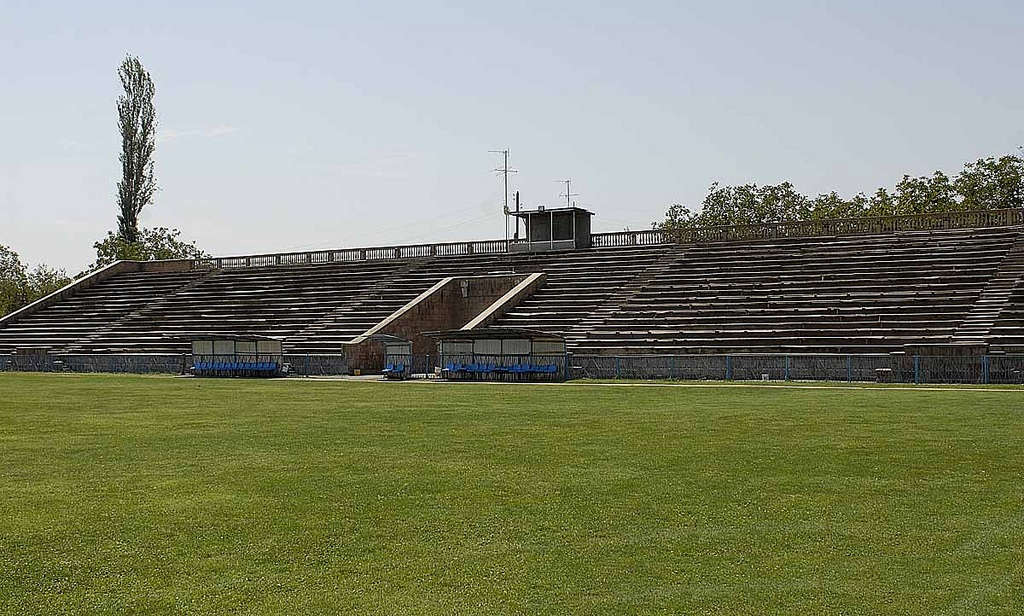
Kasaghi Marzik Stadium

FC Mika was founded in 1999 on the basis of the merger of 2 football clubs: Mika Ashtarak and Kasagh Ashtarak Under the merger, the name of the new club became Mika-Kasagh Ashtarak. However, the merger only lasted for 1 year; until 2000. Kasagh Ashtarak restored its original name, keeping their logo, history and statistics, while FC Mika settled for being a new club. In 2007, Mika was relocated from Ashtarak to Yerevan. The only stadium of the city is Kasaghi Marzik Stadium with a capacity of 3,500 spectators.

The sport school of Ashtarak is regulated by the Sevan sports public organization. The centre was entirely renovated and opened in July 2017, with an approximate cost of US$1 million. The school has around 350 young athletes specialized in Olympic wrestling, weightlifting, boxing, martial arts, volleyball, basketball, football and chess.

Ashtarak is also home to the "Ayrudzi" horse racing club.

== International relations ==
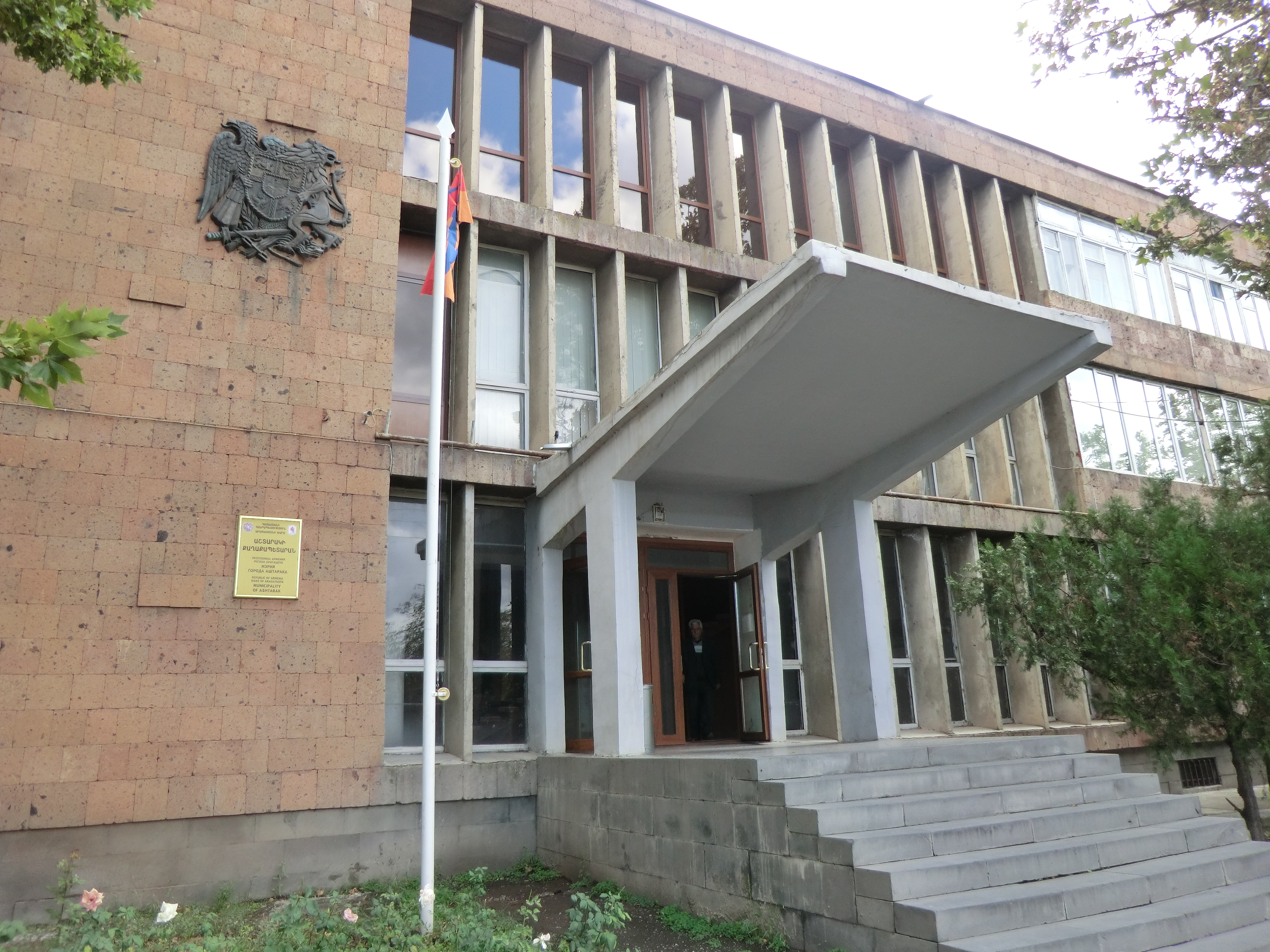
Ashtarak town hall

=== Twin towns – Sister cities ===
Ashtarak is twinned with:

- Alfortville, France (since 1993).

== Notable people ==
- Nerses V Ashtaraketsi (1770–1857), Catholicos of all Armenians
- Perch Proshyan (1837–1907), novelist
- Smbat Shahaziz (1840–1908), poet
- Norair Sisakian (1907–1966) Soviet Armenian biochemist and one of the founders of space biology
- Gevorg Emin (1918–1998), poet
- Emil Gabrielian (1931–2010), Armenian physician
- Vardges Petrosyan (1932–1994), playwright and novelist
- Vazgen Muradian (1921–2018), composer

== See also ==
- Aragatsotn Province
