= Smbat Shahaziz =

Armenian poet

Smbat Shahaziz (Armenian: Սմբատ Շահազիզ, 1840 in Ashtarak, Russian Empire – January 5, 1908 in Moscow) was an Armenian educator, poet and publicist.

== Biography ==
Born in a family of a priest, he was the youngest of six brothers. He was home schooled until the age 10, and then sent to Lazarian College in Moscow. Upon his graduation in 1862 he was asked to stay and teach modern and Classical Armenian at the primary school level, all the while he was preparing for a university degree. In 1867 he was granted a degree in oriental languages by the University of St. Petersburg. He obtained a college level teaching position at Lazarian College and retained it for thirty five years, until his retirement in 1897.

He started writing in his student days and was influenced by Raphael Patkanian and Khachatur Abovyan. He contributed to the journal Hiusisapayl (Northern Lights), which was founded and edited by Stepanos Nazarian. His articles and essays received public interest and he remained a contributor until the papers demise. In 1860 he published his first collection of poems, titled Azatutyan zhamer (Hours of Freedom) comprising thirty three poems, most of which were written in modern Armenian and few in classical. The theme of the poems varied between love, nature, and national heroes. His second book was published in 1865: it was a long patriotic poem titled Levoni vishte (Levon's Grief). The poem is about Levon, a serious-minded, idealistic Armenian youth studying in the far north. He is deeply concerned and grieved by the dire conditions of his homeland, while his compatriots carry on in prodigal life, some even deny their Armenian identities. Lonely and grieved he decides to return home and contribute to the struggle against ignorance, servility, moral and religious decline, and corrupt leadership in all domains. The poem which reflected the reformist ideology emerging in Russian Empire at the time, was very well received.

Articles, essays, and speeches about the national and social issues of the time make a considerable part of Shahaziz's legacy. He encouraged the use of the modern Armenian language, criticized methods of archaic education and conservatism of religious leaders, and denounced despotism and the hypocritical attitude of European powers with regards to the Armenian question. In 1893 he founded the Abovian-Nazarian Fund for writers in financial need. After his retirement in 1898 he created a committee in Moscow to organize the care and education of children orphaned because of the Hamidian massacres. He exposed the anti-Armenian stance of czarist Russia regime in Hishogutiuner Vardanants toni artiv (Recollections on the Occasion of the Feast of Vardanants, 1901) and duplicity of Ottoman diplomacy in Mi kani khosk im entertsoghnerin (A few words to my readers, 1903). He died in 1908.
