= Talin, Armenia =

City in Aragatsotn, Armenia

Talin Թալին
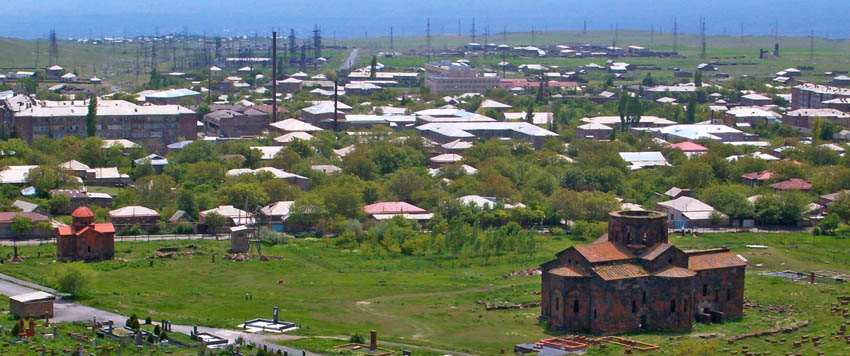
- Talin

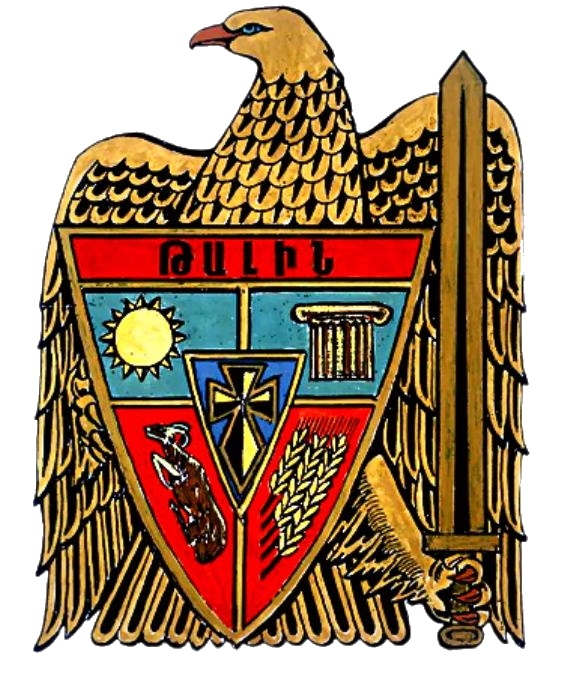
- Coat of arms

- Location within Armenia Location within Aragatsotn
- Coordinates: 40°22′58.65″N 43°52′25.185″E
- Country: Armenia
- Province: Aragatsotn
- Municipality: Talin
- First mentioned: 2nd century

Area
  - Total: 7 km^{2} (2.7 sq mi)
- Elevation: 1,585 m (5,200 ft)

Population (2022 census)
  - Total: 3,904
  - Density: 560/km^{2} (1,400/sq mi)
- Time zone: GMT+4
- Website: Official web

Talin (Armenian: Թալին) is a town in the Talin Municipality of the Aragatsotn Province of Armenia. As of the 2011 census, Talin had a population of 5,310. According to the 2016 official estimate, Talin currently has a population of around 3,800. The community is notable for the 7th-century Cathedral of Talin. As of the 2011 census, Talin had a population of 3,904.

== Etymology ==
Throughout its history, Talin (Թալին), was known in several different pronunciations including Talina (Թալինա), Talin Mets (Թալին Մեծ), Talin Verin (Թալին Վերին), Talno votn (Թալնո ոտն), and Hayi Talin (Հայի Թալին). Talina is most probably the Hellenized version of Talin, used by Ptolemy during the 2nd century.

Talin is a common feminine name in the Armenian diaspora.

== History ==
=== Ancient history and Middle Ages ===
Talin is one of the oldest settlements in modern-day Armenia, with ancient foundations dating back to the 2nd millennium BCE(or roughly four thousand years ago). The first reference to the town of Talin was made by Ptolemy during the 2nd century CE. Ptolemy referred to the settlement as Talina; the Hellenized version of the Armenian name of Talin.

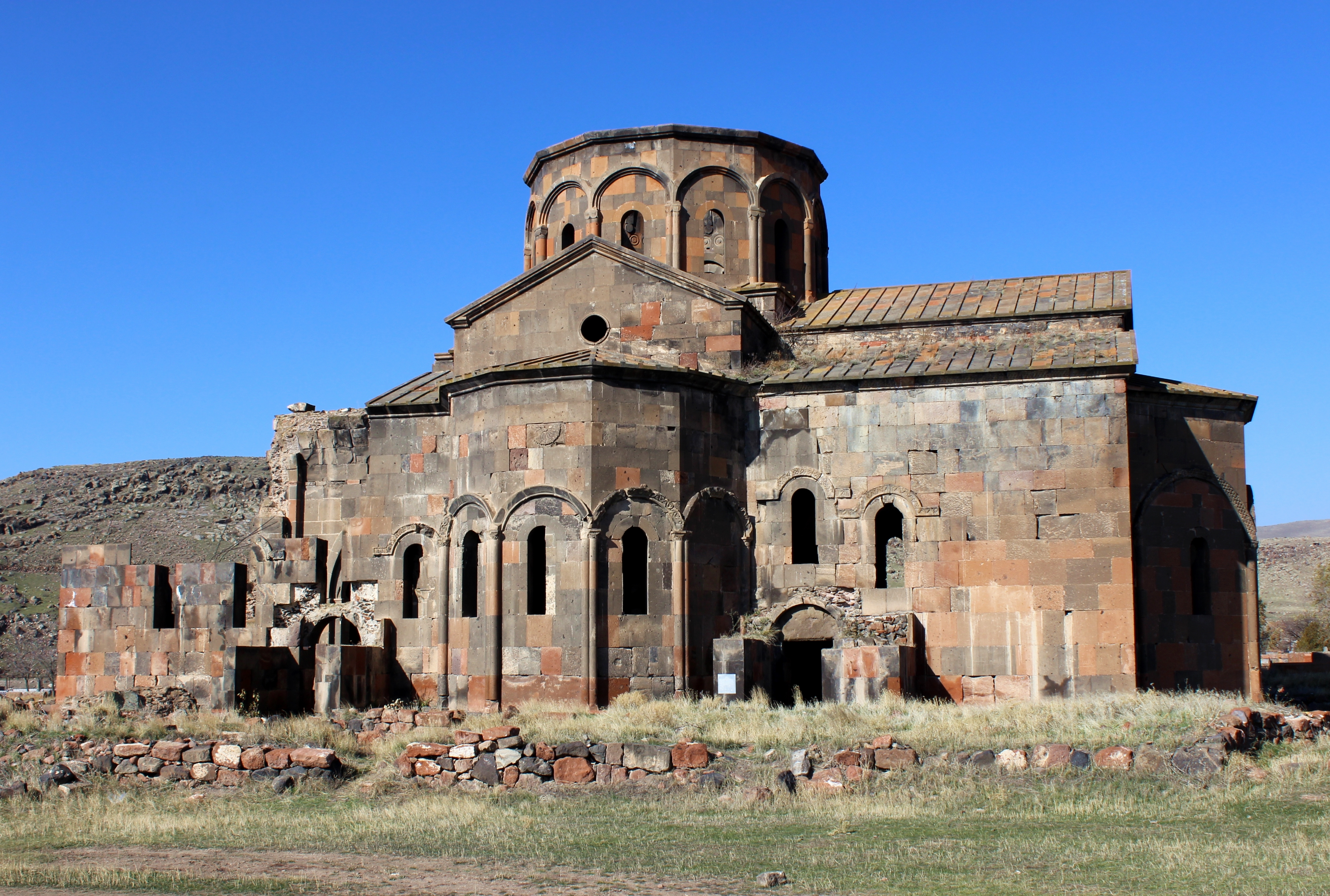
The 7th-century Cathedral of Talin

Between the 7th and 10th centuries CE, Talin has been constantly mentioned by many historians, either as a big village or a town under the rule of Kamsarakan Armenian noble family, within the Aragatsotn canton of Ayrarat; the 15th province of Greater Armenia.

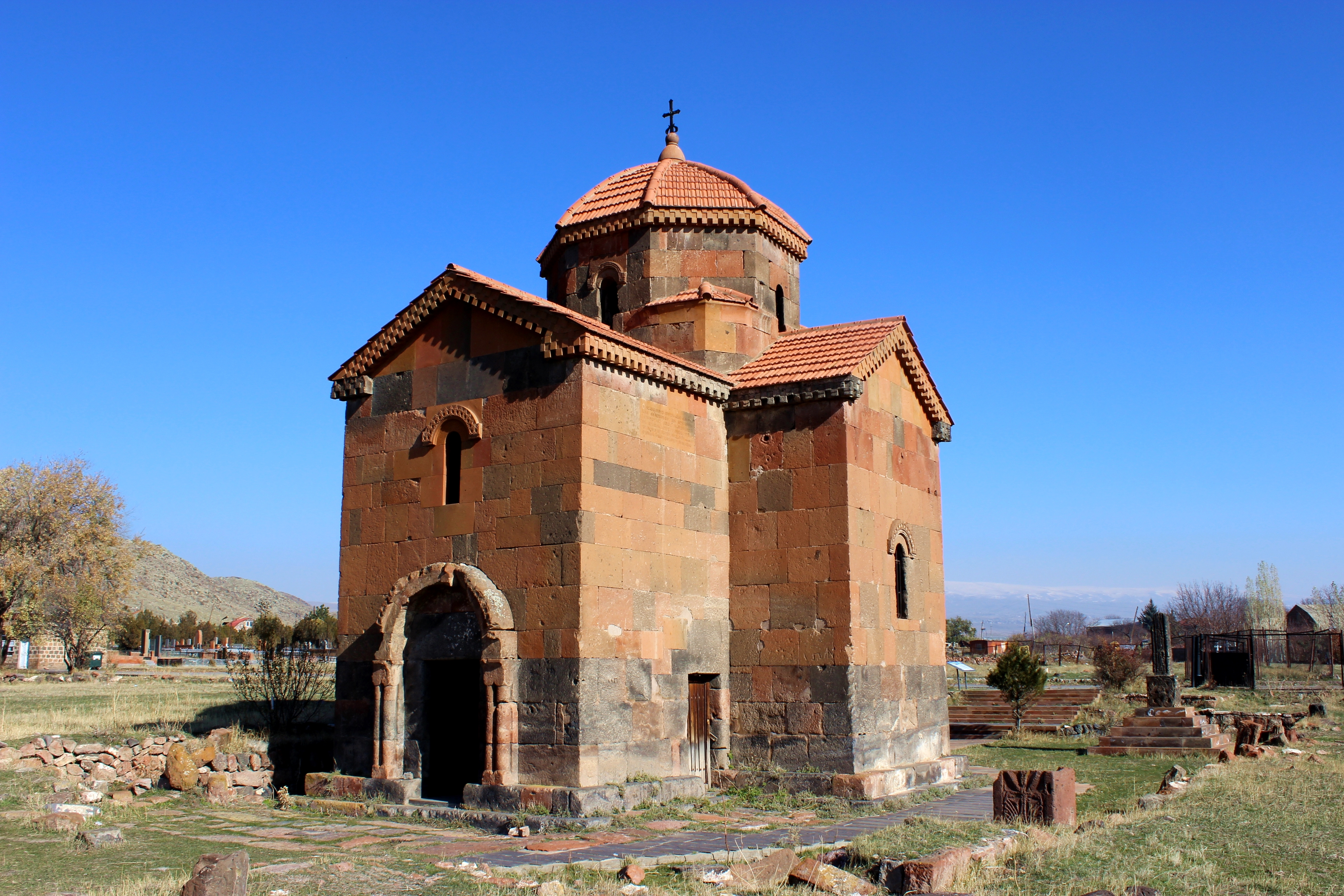
The small church of Talin Cathedral, consecrated in 689 CE

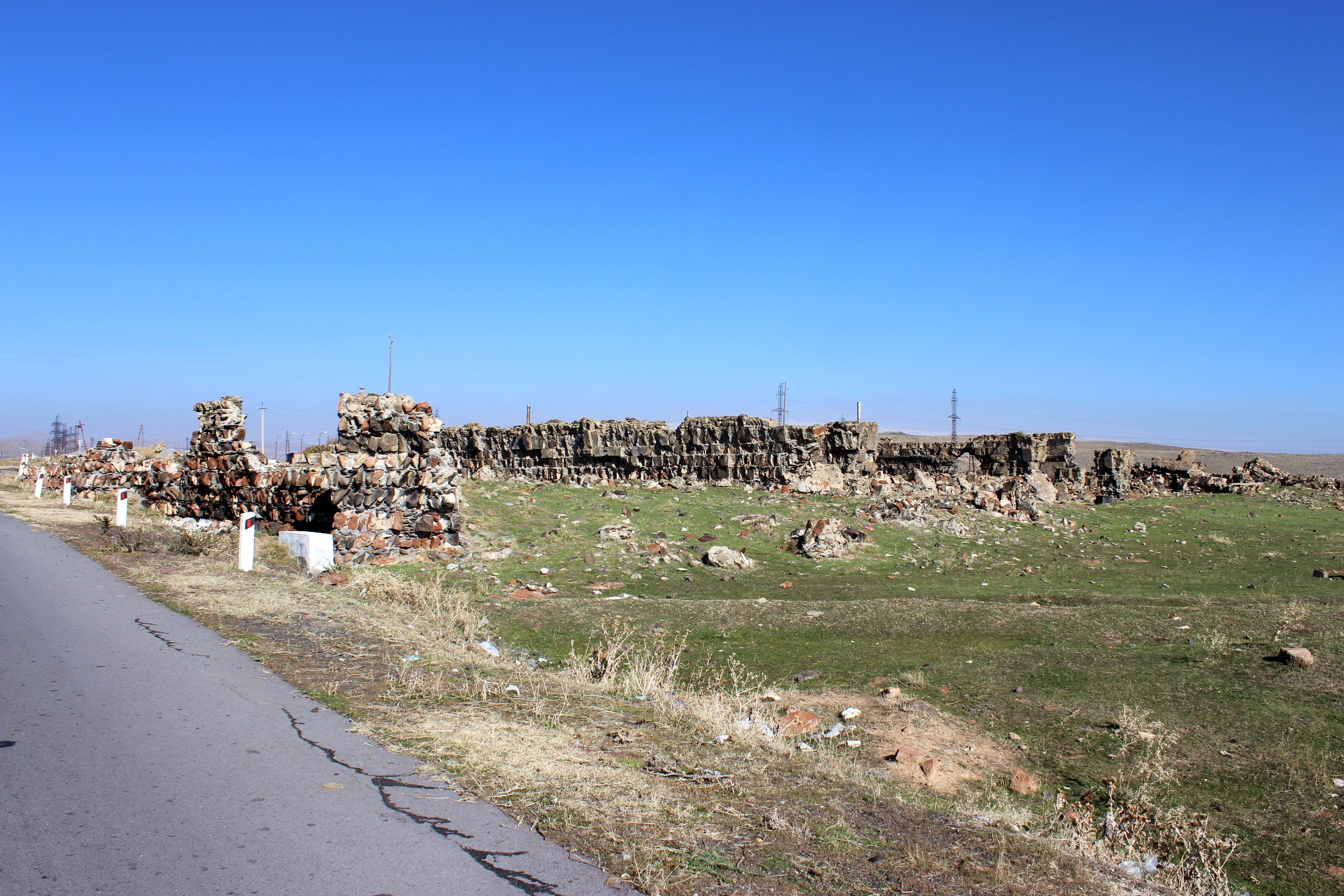
The remains of the 13th-century Caravanserai of Talin, along the road towards Dashtadem at the south

In 774 CE, Talin was seized and its population was ruled by the Arab Muslims. However, the town was revived with the establishment of the Bagratid Kingdom of Armenia by the end of the 9th century CE.

The religious complex of the Cathedral of Talin was founded during the late 7th century CE, by prince Nerseh Kamsarakan. During the same period, the Dashtadem Fortress was also built by the Kamsarakan princes south of the town.

In 1162 CE, Talin was severely attacked and destroyed by the invading Seljuks. Most of the town's population was either massacred or fell captive to the Seljuk army.

Dashtadem Fortress of Talin played a vital role as a strategic point north of Yerevan, during the wars between the Ottomans and Persians.

=== 16th to 19th centuries ===
In 1514, Talin was occupied by Selim II after the decisive Ottoman victory over the Safavid Persians in the Battle of Chaldiran. The Armenians of Talin started an uprising against the Ottomans, that led to the massacre of the population of the town by the Ottoman forces.

In 1639, based on the Treaty of Zuhab signed between the Ottomans and Persians, Talin became part of the Erivan Khanate under the rule of Safavid Persia. However, under the Persian rule, the town gradually lost its significance during the 17th and 18th centuries, eventually turning into a tiny village.

During the 1st half of the 19th century, following the Russo-Persian War in 1826–28, and as a result of the Treaty of Turkmenchay, major territories of Eastern Armenia -including Talin- became part of the Russian Empire in 1829. Many Armenian families from Western Armenia, particularly from Kars, Daruynk and Alashkert, migrated to Talin in 1829-30.

=== Modern history ===
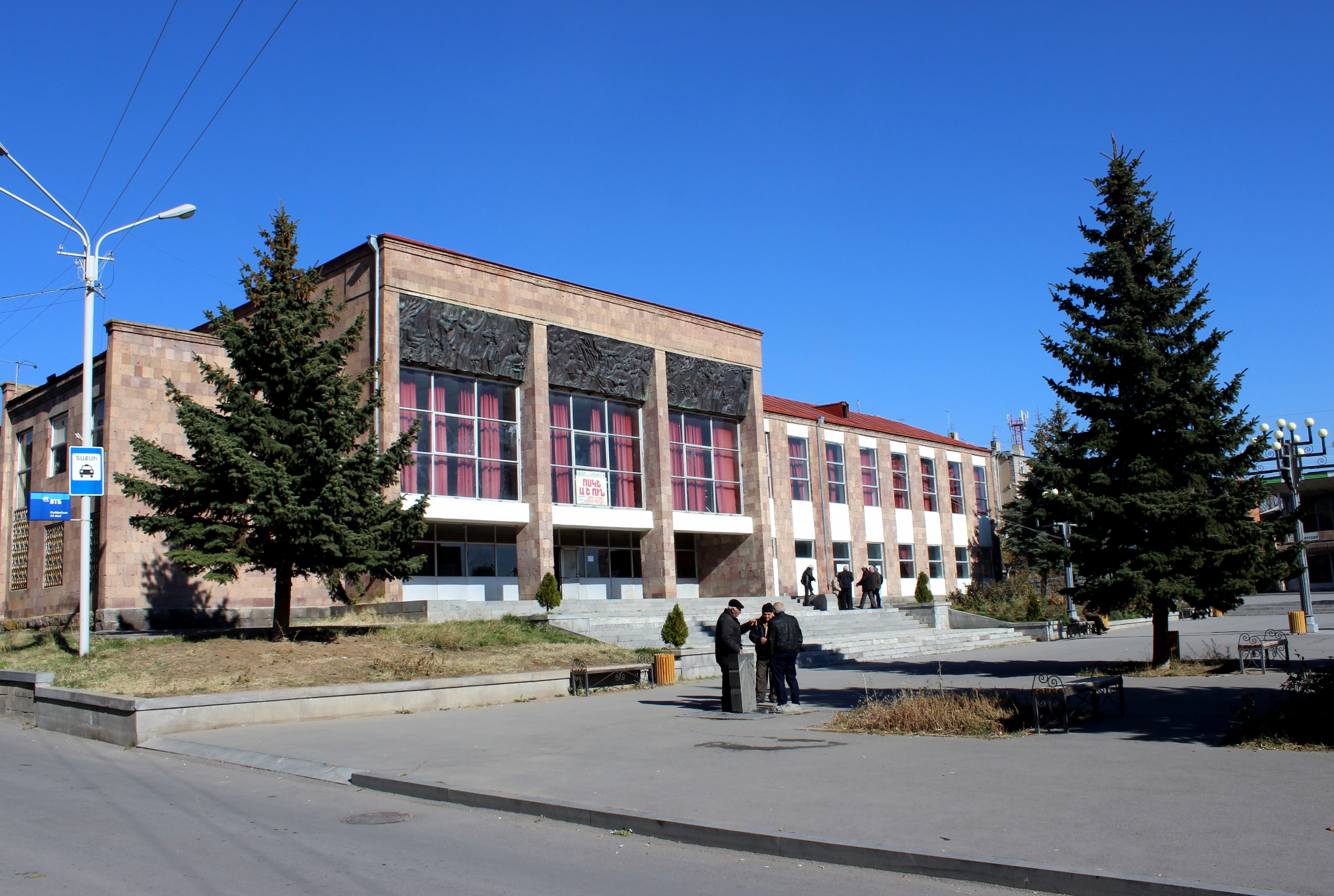
The house of culture at the central square

At the beginning of the 20th century, during the years of the Armenian genocide, many Armenian refugee families arrived in Talin from the Western Armenian cities of Van, Mush, Alashkert and Karin between 1914-1918. In May 1918, Talin was included within the newly founded Republic of Armenia that lasted until December 1920.

Under the Soviet rule, Talin became the administrative centre of Talin raion formed in 1930. In 1964, Talin was given the status of an urban-type settlement.

In 1995, the government of independent Armenia reaffirmed the status of Talin as an urban settlement within the Aragatsotn Province.

In 2019 Talin won the Armenian title of the "Clean community of the year".

== Geography ==
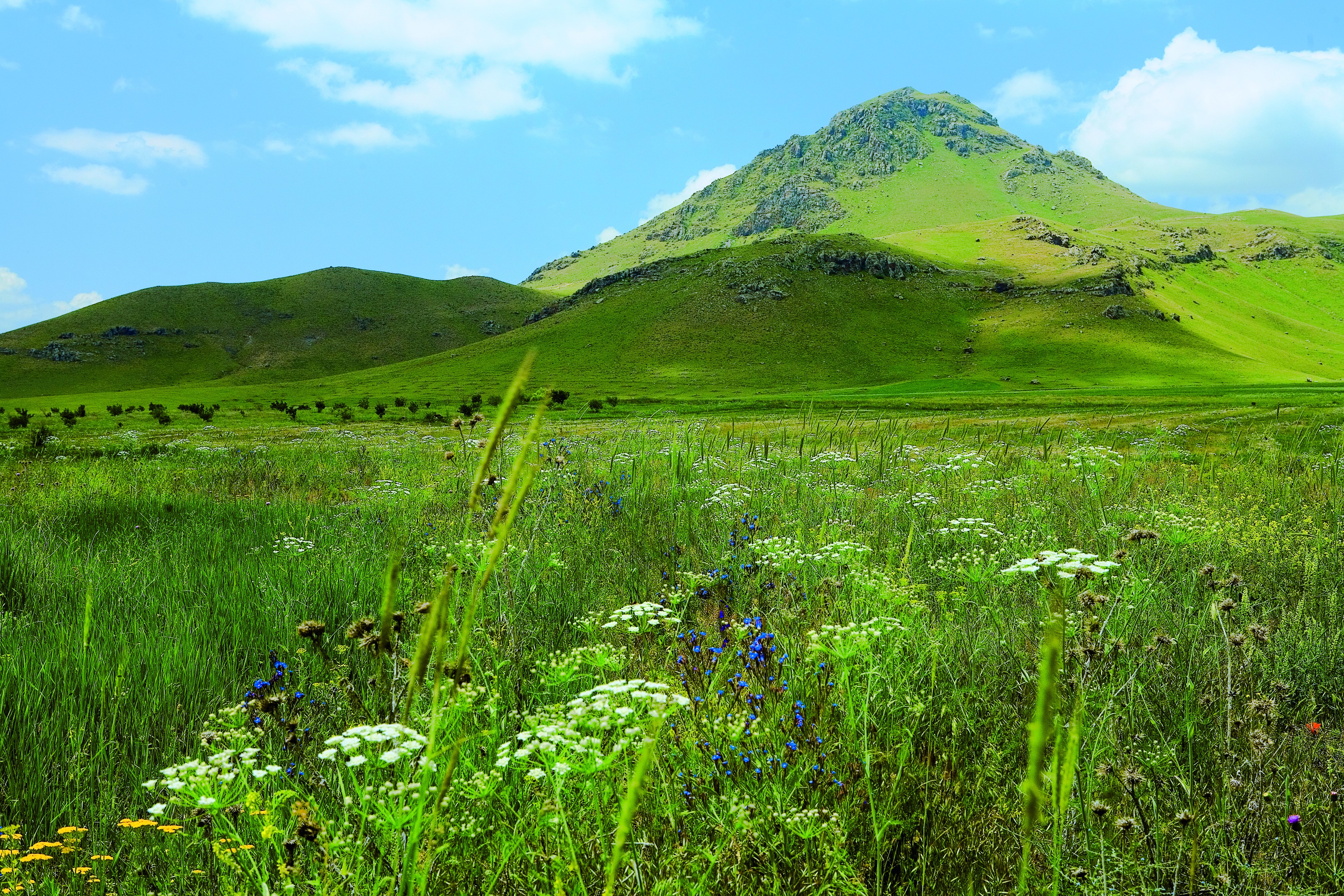
Arteni Volcano near Talin

Talin is situated at the western foot of Mount Aragats within the Shirak Plain, at a height of 1,585 meters above sea level, near the Arteni Volcano which is located around 6 km west of Talin. The capital Yerevan is at a road distance of 68 km southeast of Talin. The town is surrounded with dry steppes.

Talin has a humid continental climate, characterized with hot/warm summers and extremely cold and snowy winters. The average annual precipitation is 397 mm.

Climate data for Talin (1991-2020)
Month	Jan	Feb	Mar	Apr	May	Jun	Jul	Aug	Sep	Oct	Nov	Dec	Year
Record high °C (°F)	8.6 (47.5)	12.4 (54.3)	20.1 (68.2)	25.8 (78.4)	28.0 (82.4)	32.4 (90.3)	37.5 (99.5)	36.0 (96.8)	35.6 (96.1)	27.8 (82.0)	20.5 (68.9)	13.4 (56.1)	37.5 (99.5)
Daily mean °C (°F)	−5.3 (22.5)	−3.8 (25.2)	1.9 (35.4)	7.5 (45.5)	12.3 (54.1)	17.2 (63.0)	21.1 (70.0)	21.6 (70.9)	17.1 (62.8)	10.7 (51.3)	3.2 (37.8)	−2.9 (26.8)	8.4 (47.1)
Record low °C (°F)	−23.0 (−9.4)	−21.6 (−6.9)	−19.5 (−3.1)	−14.6 (5.7)	−1.6 (29.1)	0.8 (33.4)	3.4 (38.1)	8.0 (46.4)	0.0 (32.0)	−2.9 (26.8)	−18.2 (−0.8)	−21.7 (−7.1)	−23.0 (−9.4)
Average precipitation mm (inches)	18.0 (0.71)	17.8 (0.70)	31.5 (1.24)	56.8 (2.24)	75.9 (2.99)	45.0 (1.77)	36.1 (1.42)	20.8 (0.82)	23.4 (0.92)	31.6 (1.24)	21.9 (0.86)	18.6 (0.73)	397.4 (15.64)
Average precipitation days (≥ 1 mm)	5.3	5.1	6.5	10.6	12.7	7.7	5.2	3.5	3.7	6.2	4.6	4.9	76
Average relative humidity (%)	82.9	81.4	76.2	73.1	73.9	67.9	62.8	60.7	63.3	70.9	76.3	82.7	72.7

== Demographics ==
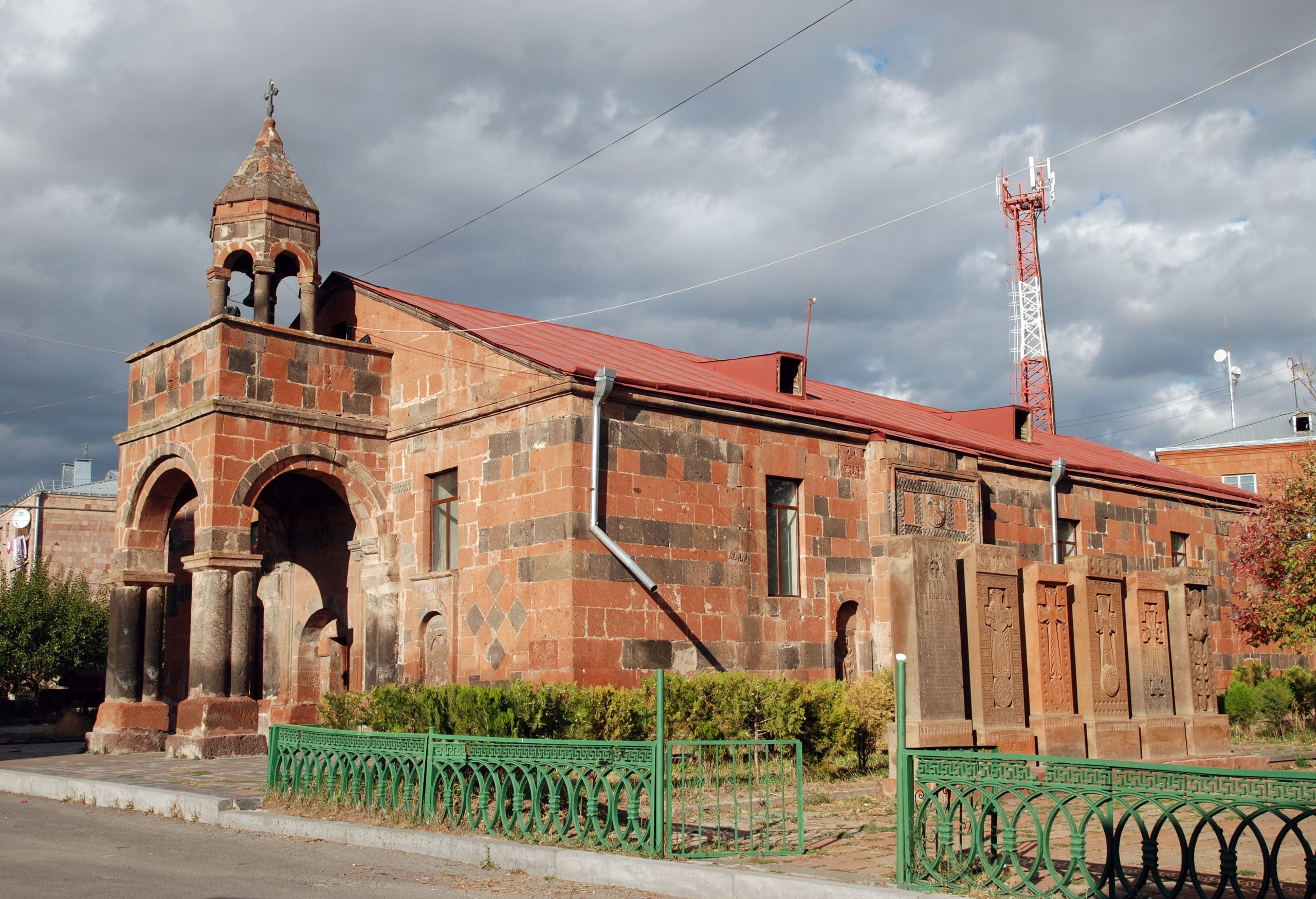
Saint George's Church of Talin

Historical population
Year	Pop.	±% p.a.
1831	457	—
1873	1,025	+1.94%
1897	1,438	+1.42%
1914	1,558	+0.47%
1939	2,255	+1.49%
1959	2,469	+0.45%
1979	4,227	+2.72%
2001	5,614	+1.30%
2011	5,310	−0.56%
2022	3,904	−2.76%

== Culture ==
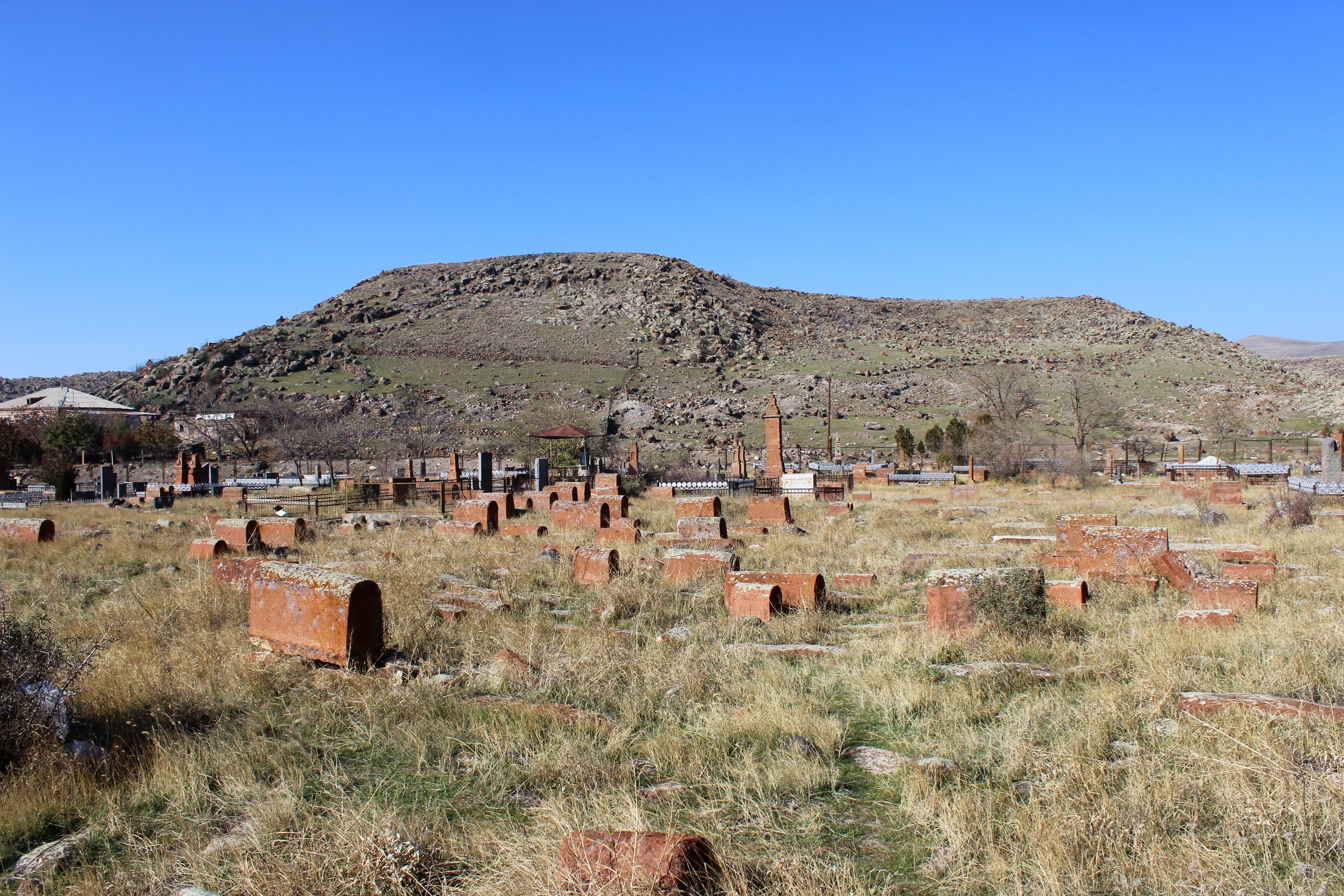
The medieval cemetery in Talin

Being one of the oldest centres of civilization in the history of Armenia, the area of Talin is rich with historical monuments. The 7th-century Cathedral of Talin built by the Kamsarakan princes, is a typical example of Armenian church architecture of the early Christian period of the Armenian nation.

Another historical monument in Talin is the 13th-century caravanserai located at the southern vicinity of the town.

During the Soviet period, being the centre of Talin raion, many cultural institutions were opened in the town. Nowadays, Talin has its house of culture, the public library, a school of music, and a geological museum.

The town has its local "Talin Ashkharh" weekly newspaper.

== Transportation ==
Talin is an important intersection in Armenia between north and south. The M-1 Motorway passes through Talin from the southeast to the northwest. Additionally, the M-9 Motorway passes across Talin from the south to the north, separating the town into two parts.

Regular mini bus trips facilitate the transportation between Talin and Yerevan, Gyumri, Ashtarak and the surrounding villages.

== Economy ==
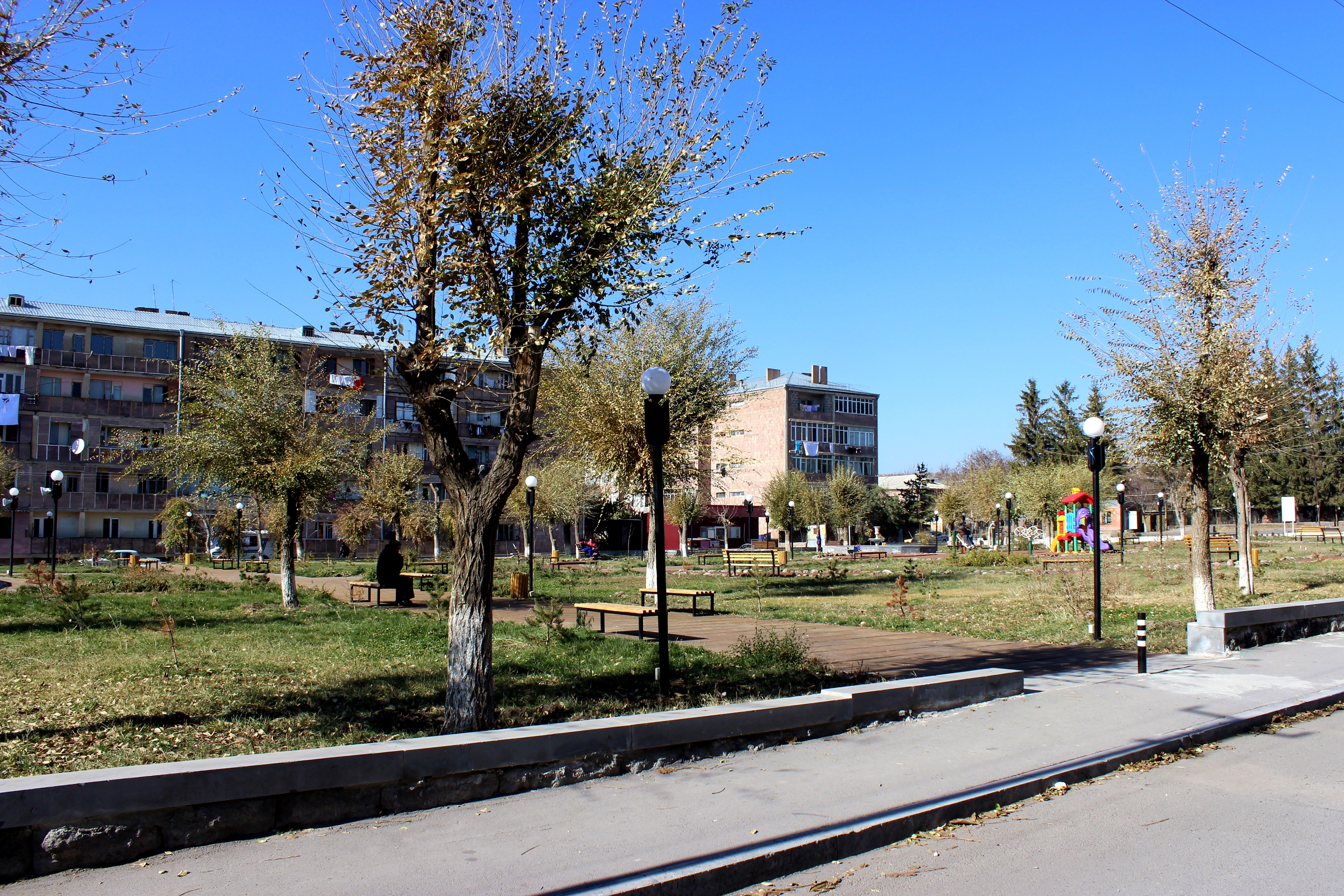
A small park in Talin

The citizens of Talin are mainly involved in agriculture. Cattle-breeding is common in the rural areas around Talin. Beekeeping farms are also found at higher woodlands.

On the other hand, gemstones production is quite developed in Talin. Currently, the "DiamoTech" Factory for gemstones and jewelry has been operating in the town since 2004.

Additionally, Talin is home to the "Bonilat" factory for dairy products founded in 2005, on the basis of the former Talin cheese factory. The town is also home to the "Avetsiyan Aghek" plant for soft drinks. An asphalt and bitumen plant is also operating since the Soviet days. The town has many small enterprises for dairy and bakery products.

As of November 2017, Talin is home to the largest solar power plant in Armenia. The 1 MW "Talin-1" solar power plant was officially opened on November 7, 2017, as a private project initiated by local investors and financed by the KfW German development bank.

== Education ==
As of 2017, Talin is home to 2 primary schools and a high school. Many pre-school kindergartens are also operating in the town.

The Aragatsotn Regional State college is a state-owned intermediate technical college based in Talin.

== Sport ==
Like the rest of the regions in Armenia, Football is the most popular sport in Talin. A sports school run by the municipality is currently operating in the town with a football training field located at the northwest of the town centre.

== People ==
- Samvel Mkrtchyan
- Anahit Hakobyan, singer and winner of the 2024 New Wave competition
- Oganes Arutunyan, is a former Soviet Armenian Greco-Roman wrestler and current coach. He won a gold medal at the 1985 European Wrestling Championships.
- Marat Grigorian, is an Armenian-Belgian kickboxer currently signed to ONE Championship, where he competes in the featherweight division.

== See also ==
- Talin Cathedral
