= Cathedral of Talin =

Armenian cathedral in Talin, Armenia

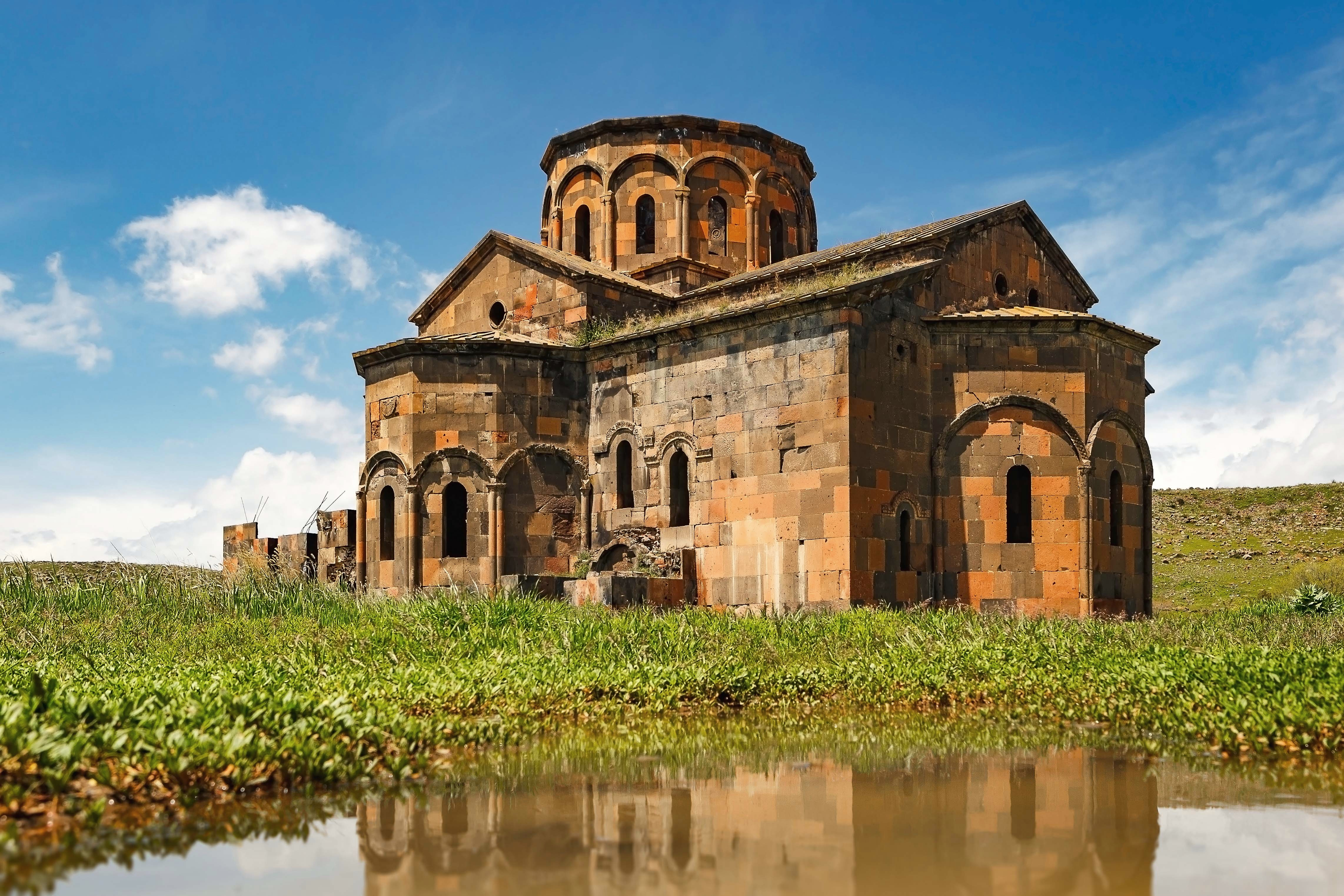

- Location within Armenia Location within Aragatsotn

Religion
- Affiliation: Armenian Apostolic Church
- Region: Caucasus
- Status: Inactive, ruins

Location
- Location: Talin, Aragatsotn Province, Armenia
- Coordinates: 40.388364°N 43.872525°E

Architecture
- Type: Domed Basilica
- Style: Armenian
- Completed: 7th century
- Domes: 1 (collapsed); 1 (S. Astvatsatsin)

The Cathedral of Talin (Armenian: Թալինի Կաթողիկե եկեղեցի) is a seventh-century Armenian cathedral located in the cemetery of Talin, in the Aragatsotn Province of Armenia.

== Talin Cathedral ==
=== Architecture ===
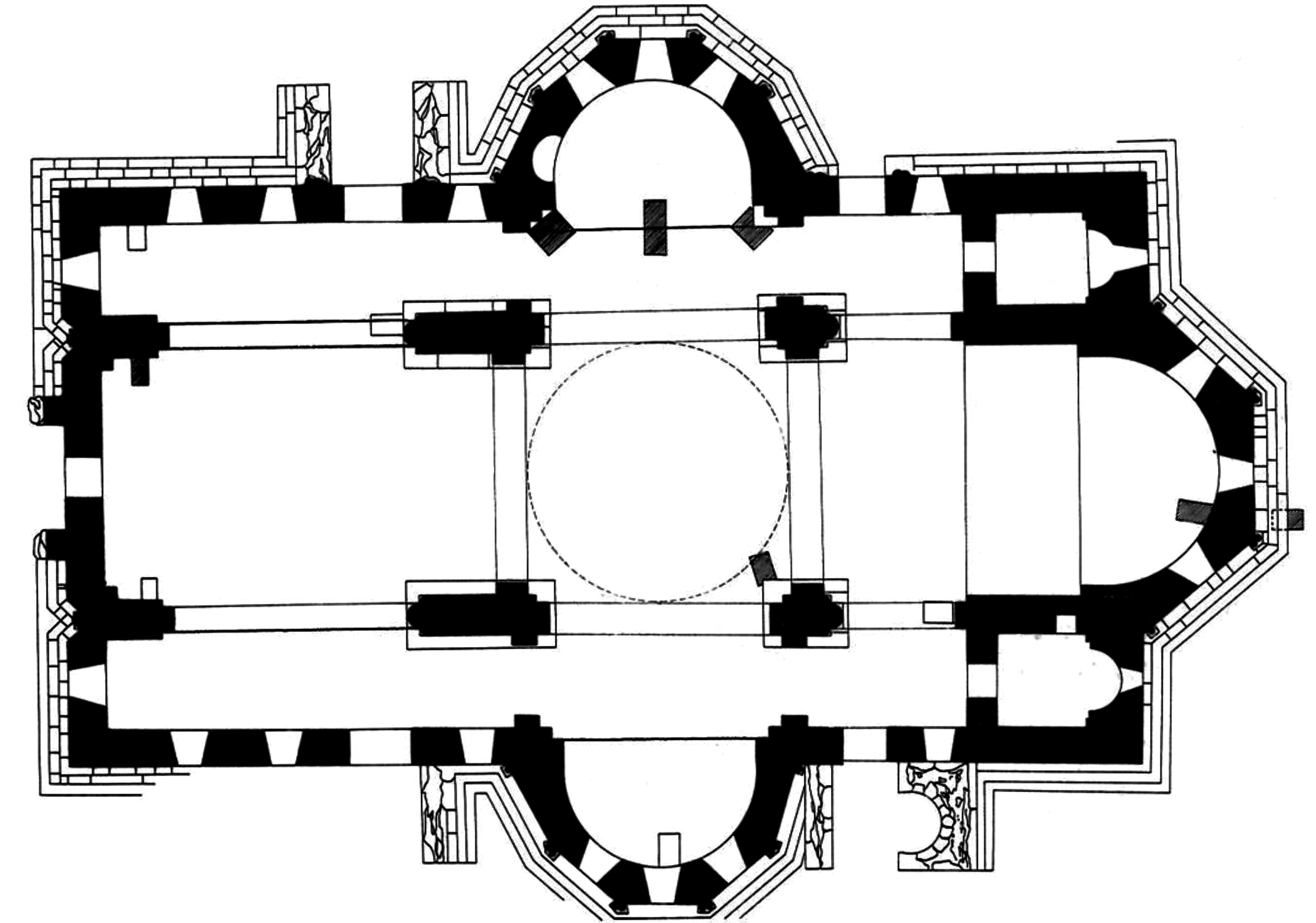
Plan of Talin Cathedral

Talin's Katoghike Church sits central to the town cemetery and dominates the surrounding landscape. It is assumed to have been constructed during the late 7th century based on the architectural style. The building is currently in ruin, where the dome and a significant portion of the western wing have since collapsed. There is a dodecagonal drum that is centrally positioned over the structure. Two prayer rooms or "studies" are positioned adjacent to and at either side of the apse. Each room contains a secret passage entrance at the second story level, facing the direction of the apse. The small passage allegedly leads to small rooms above.

The apse contains the remnants of numerous portraits of the Apostles painted as frescoes around the semi-dome above.

== Kamsarakan S. Astvatsatsin Church ==
=== Architecture ===
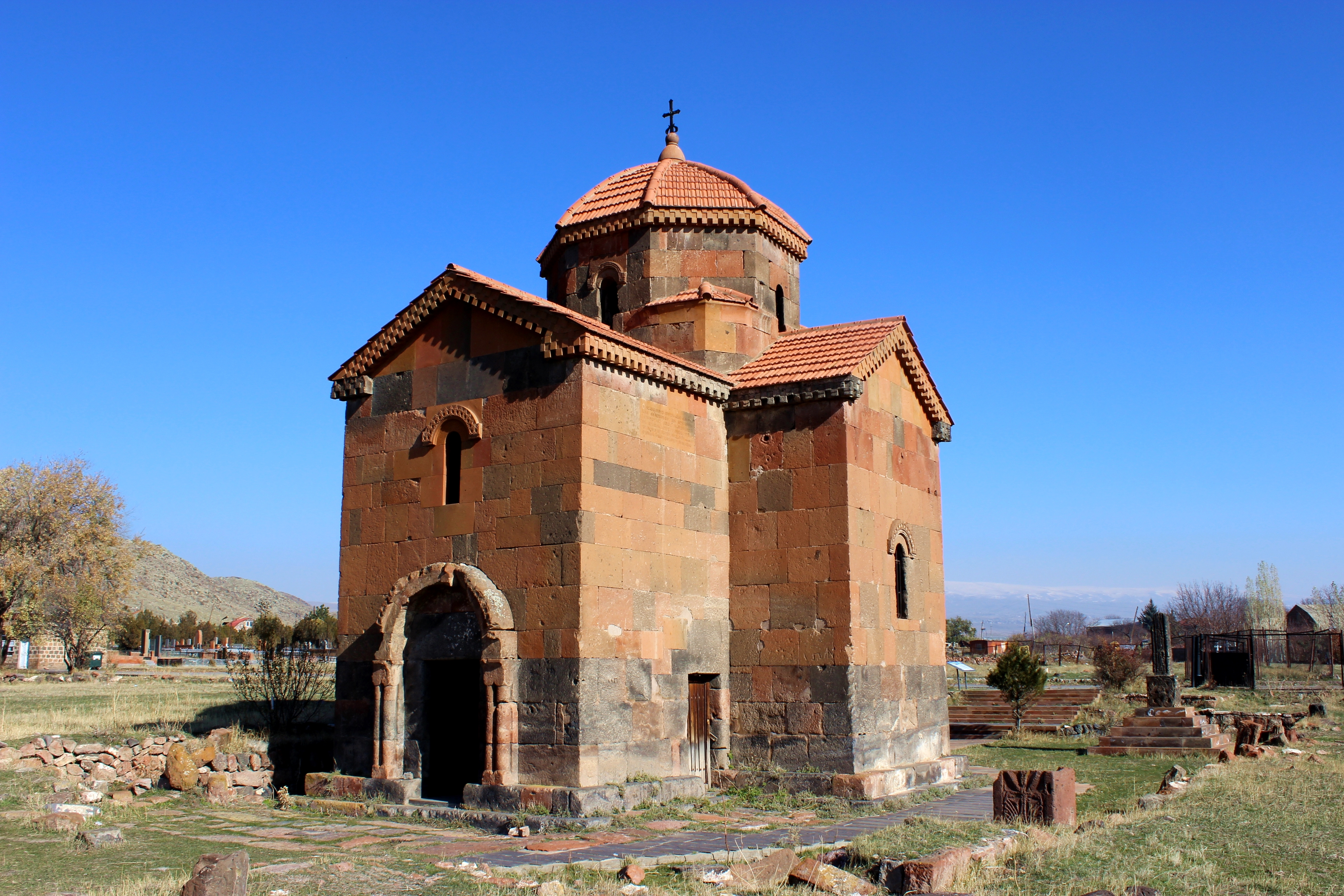
Church of Kamsarakan S. Astvatsatsin

The church of S. Astvatsatsin is situated adjacent to the entrance of the cemetery and monastic complex at Talin and near the main cathedral. It is a small cruciform central-planned building with a Byzantine-style single red tile, octagonal umbrella domed roof that is centered over the church. The dome sits above an octagonal drum that is pierced by four small windows. A decorative geometric projecting cornice trims the dome and gable roof. There is a single entrance to the building from the western façade, with an inscription written upon the half-rounded tympanum above. The inscription attests to a construction date in the 7th century. It reads the following passage:

I Nerseh the patrician proconsul, lord of Shirak and Asharunik, built this church in the name of the Holy Mother of God for her intercession for me and my wife Shushan and Hrapat my son.

There are two Nersehs that are noted to have ruled as governor; one during the reign of Byzantine Emperor Heraclius in 639, and another during that of Byzantine Emperor Justinian II in 689. Its construction has been attributed to Prince Nerseh Kamsarakan who commissioned the church during the 7th century; a time when the Kamsarakan family ruled over the region surrounding Talin.

== Gallery ==
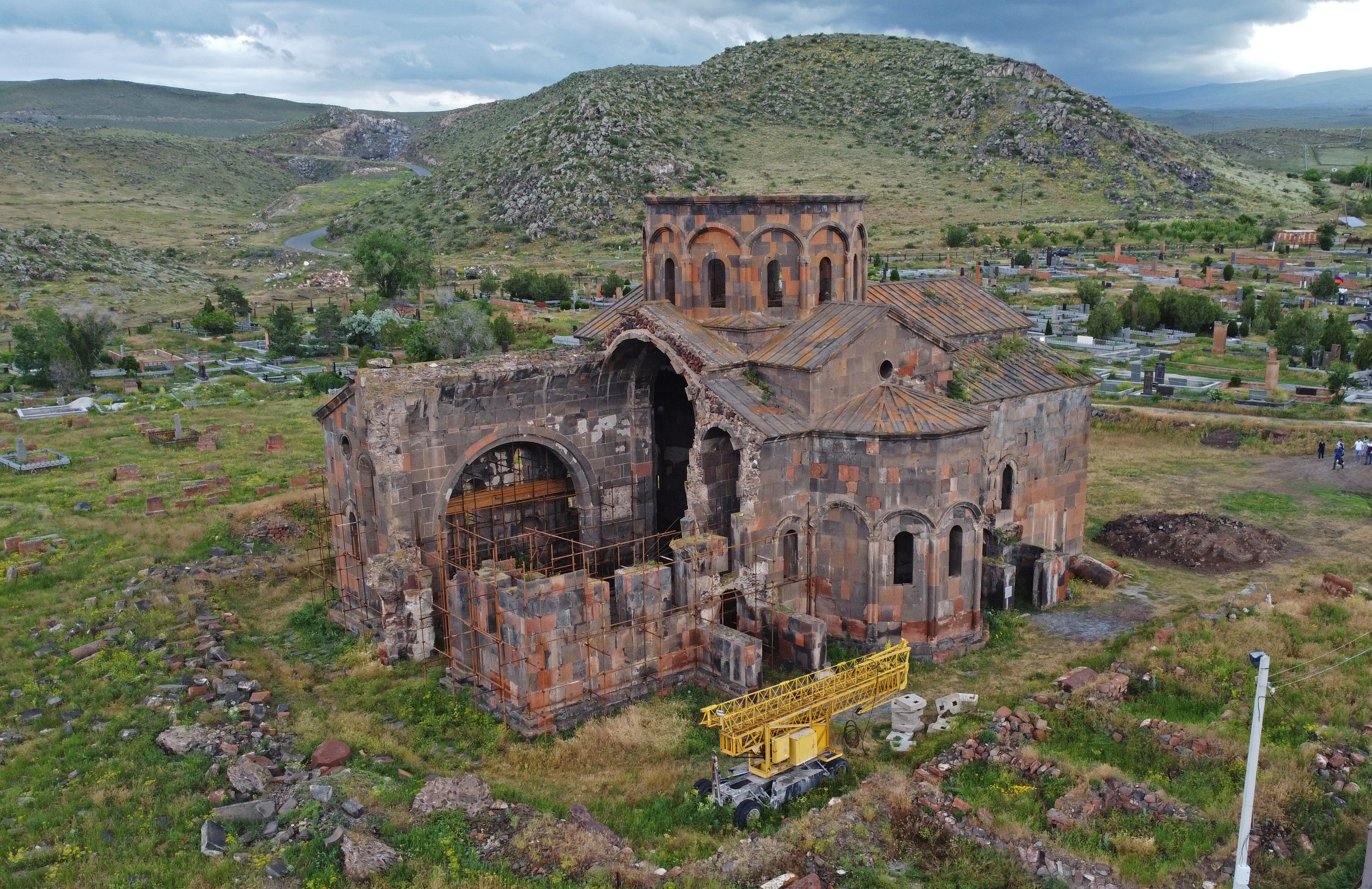
An aerial view of the cathedral

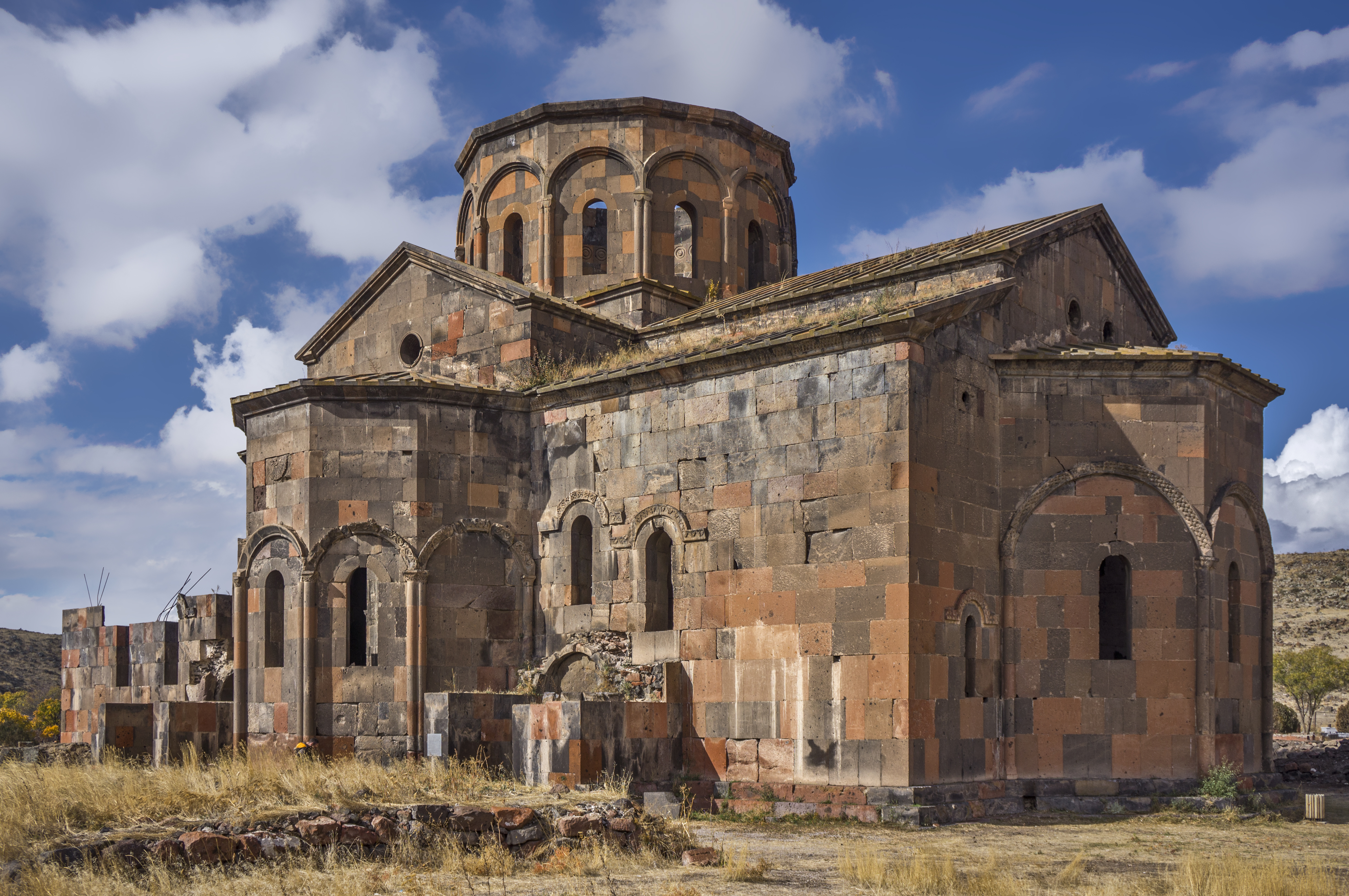

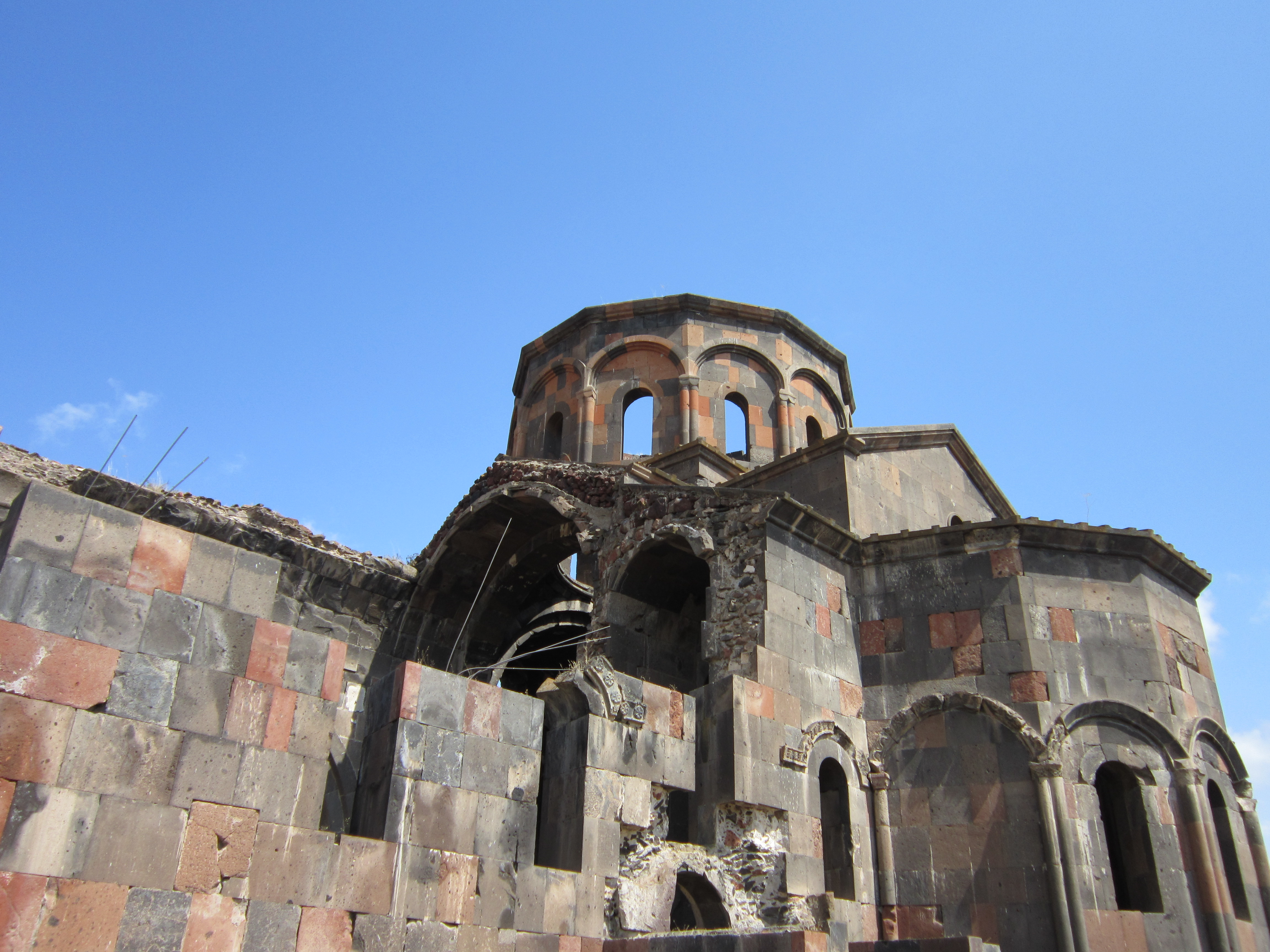

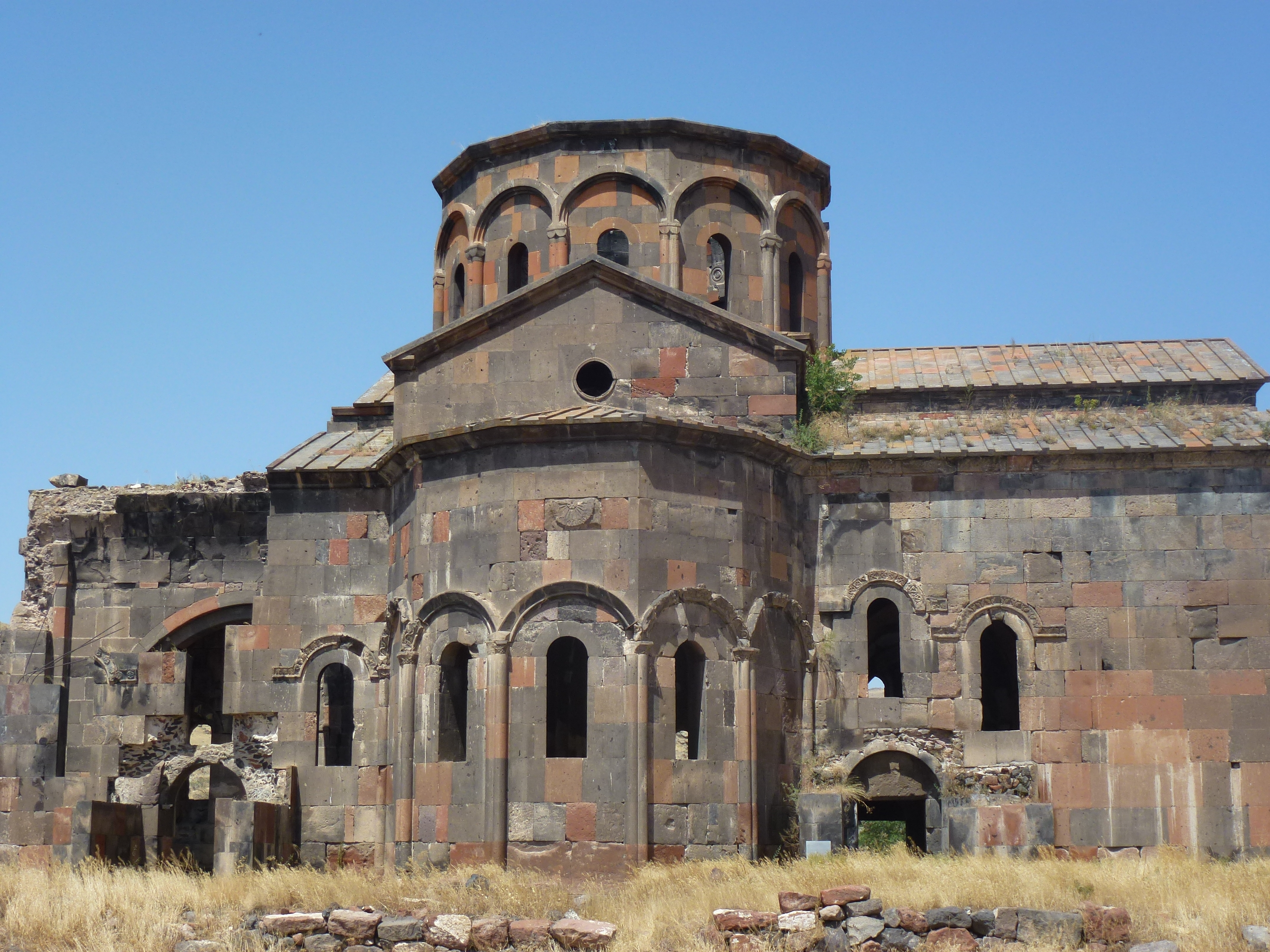

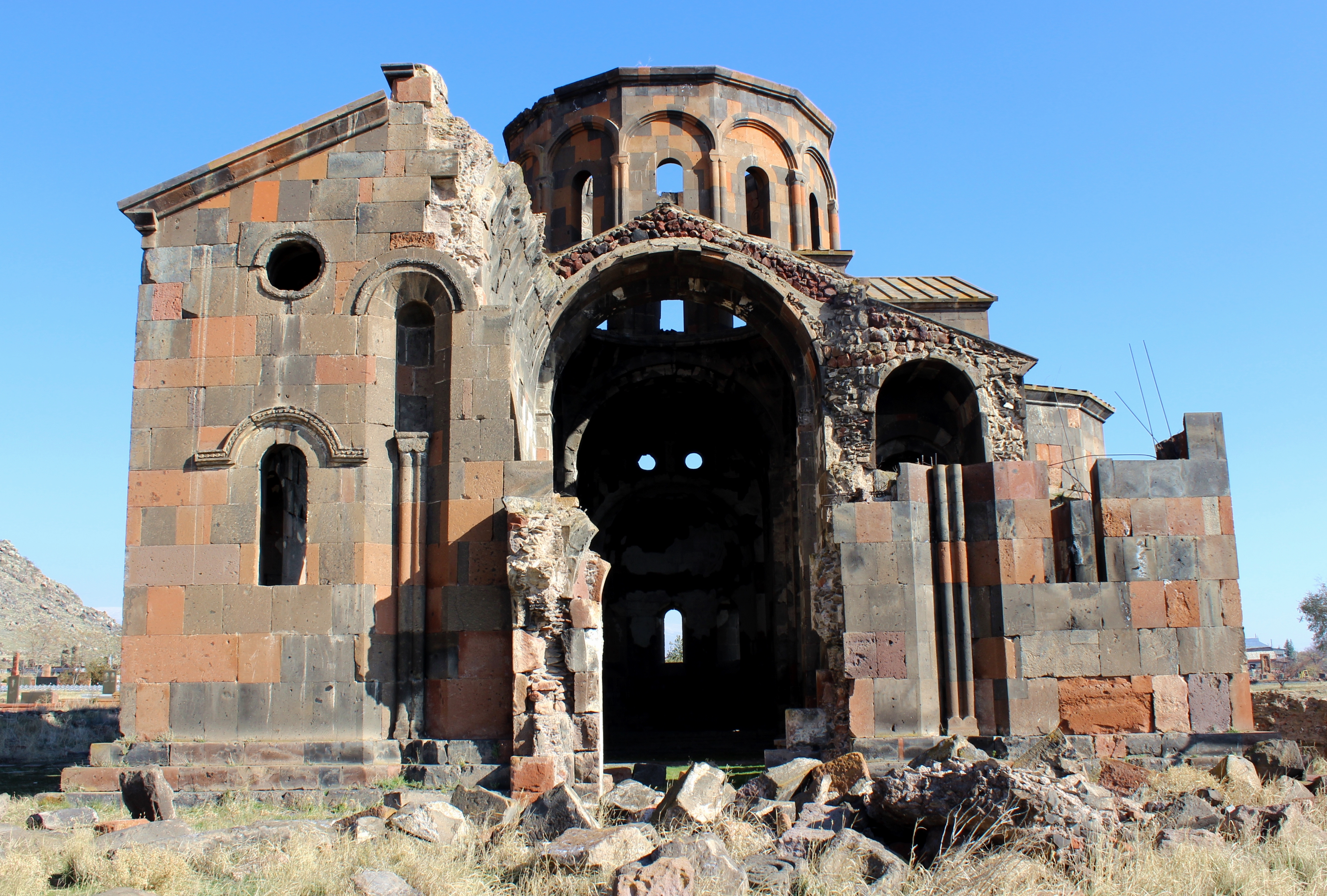
West façade of the partially collapsed Cathedral

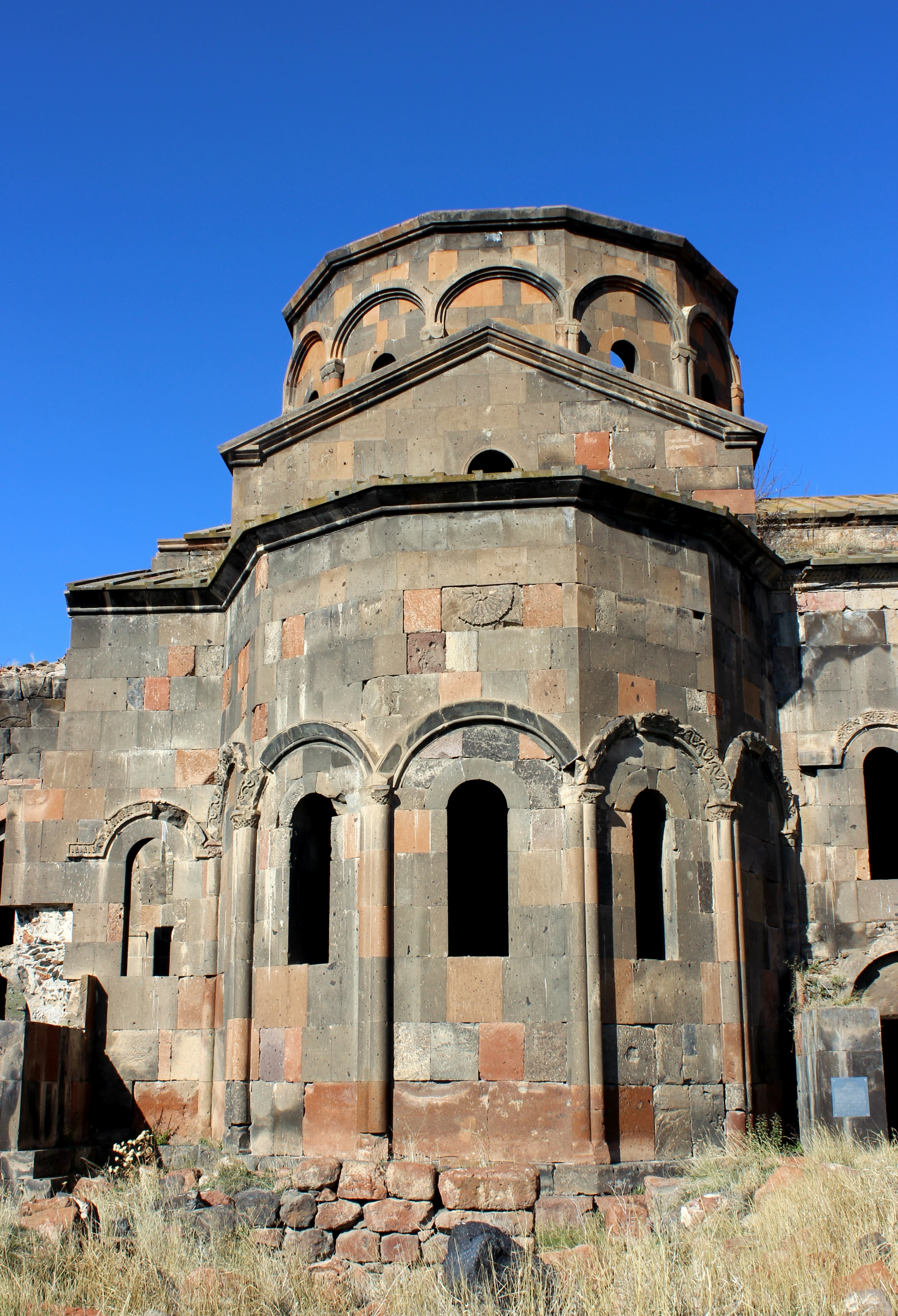
Closer view of the south façade

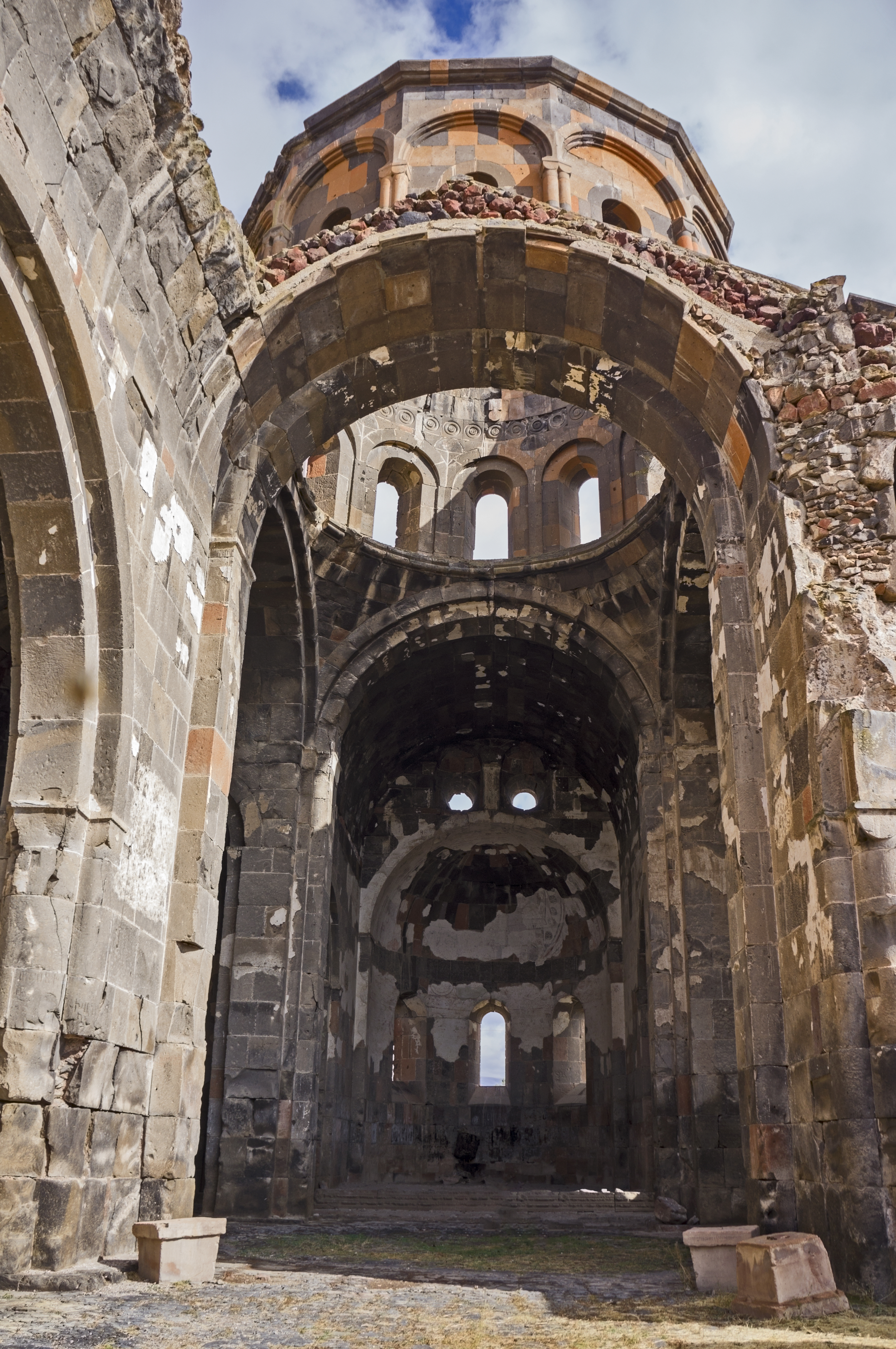

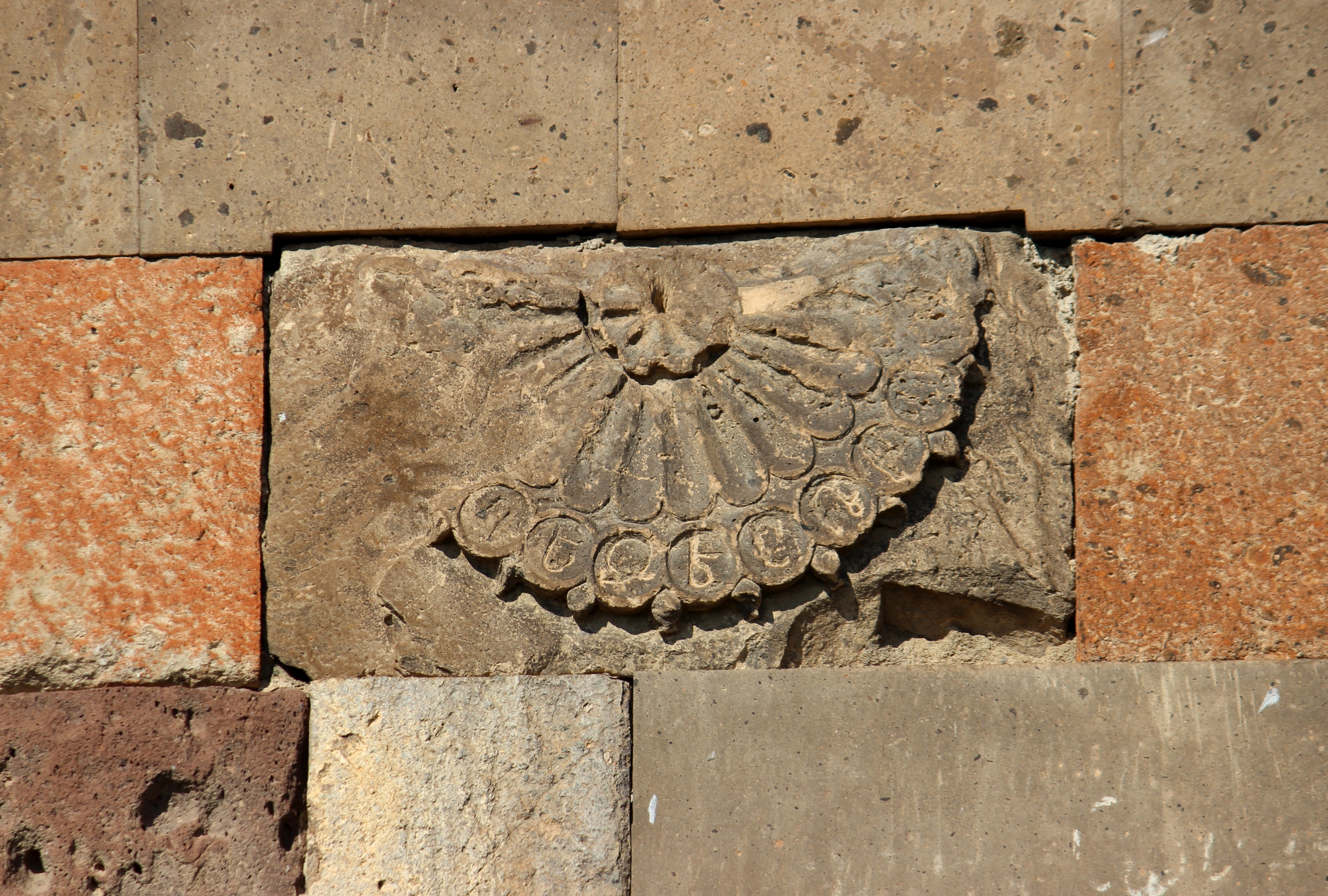
Sundial on the exterior of the drum

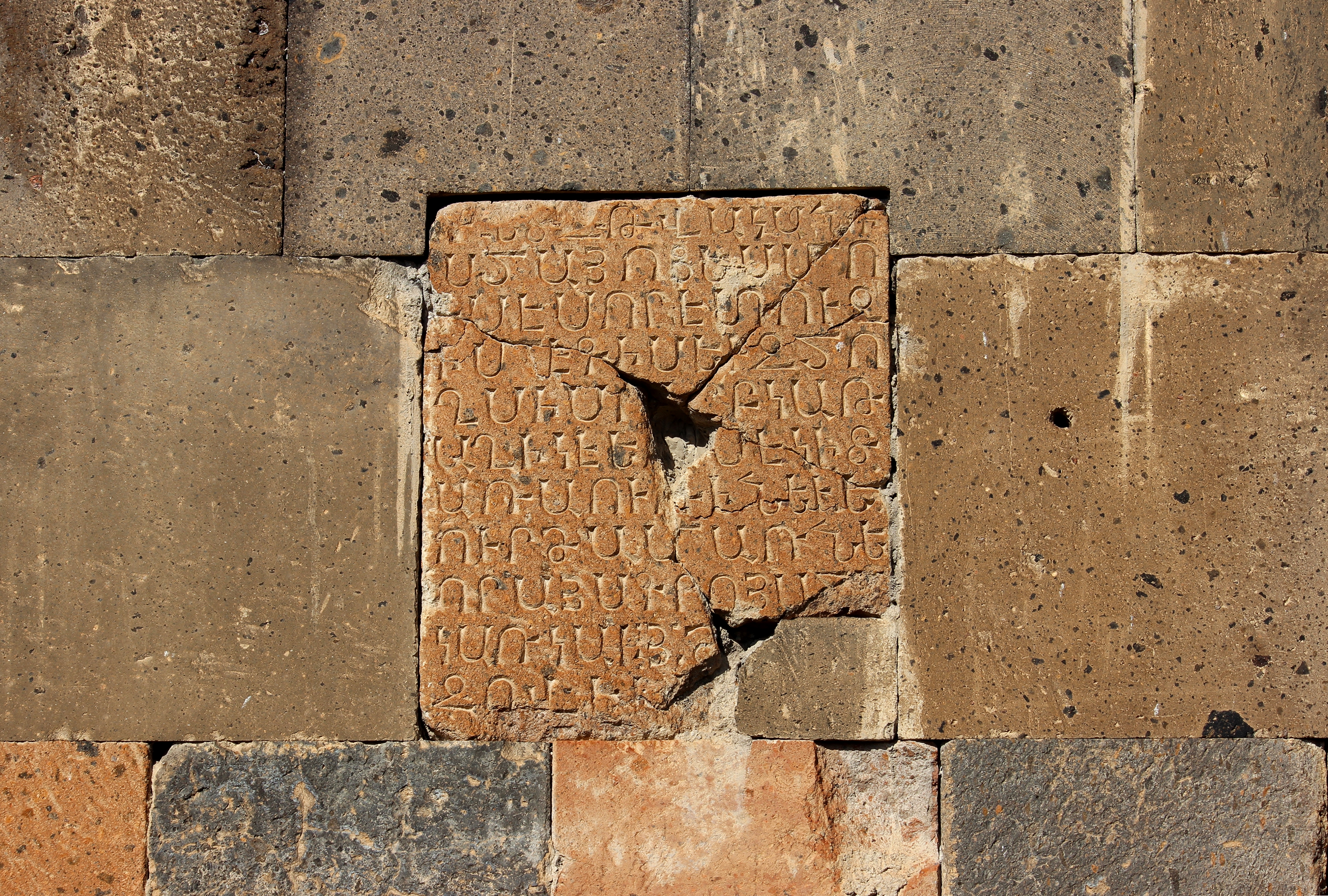
Inscription on an exterior wall

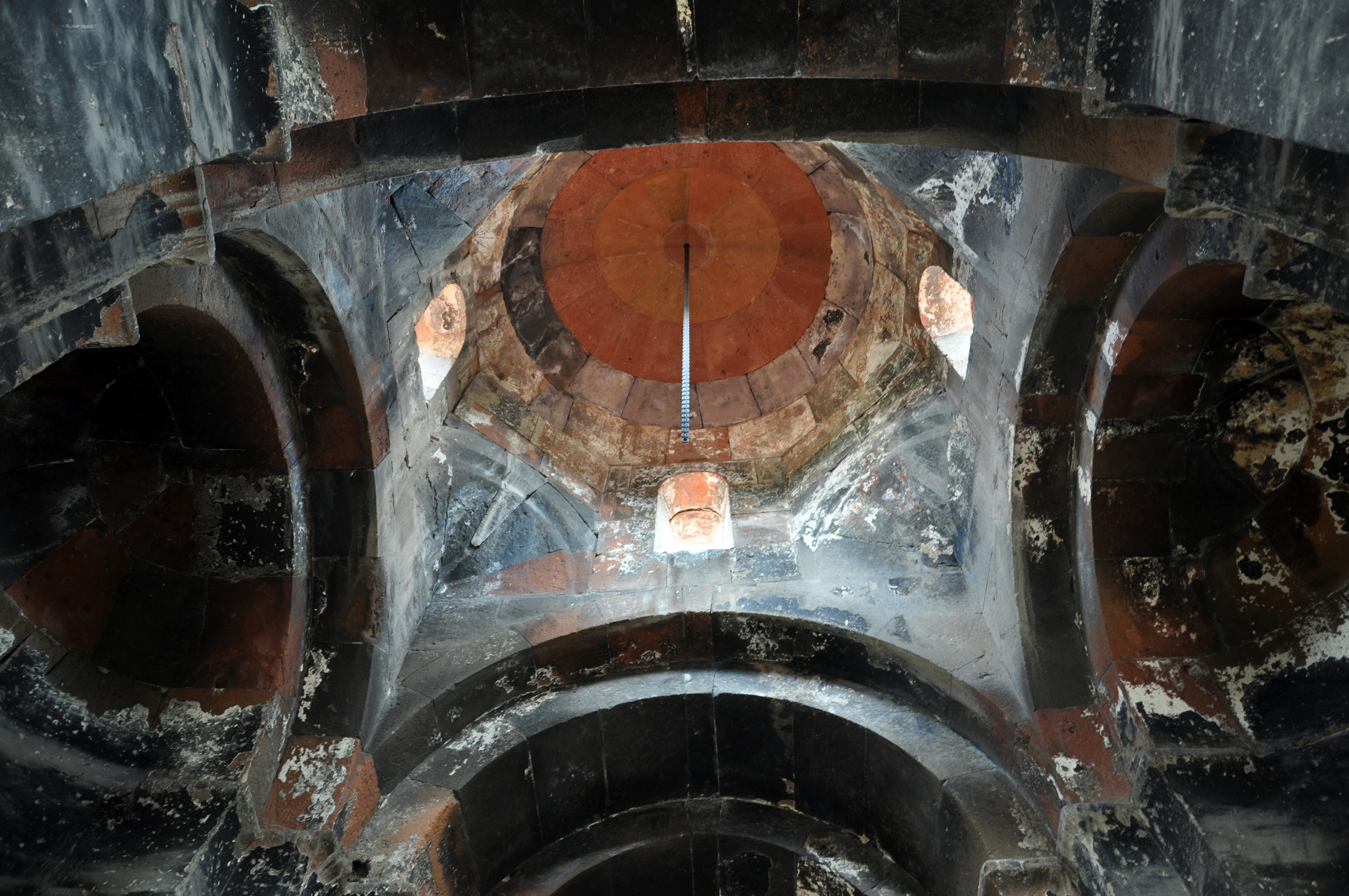
Interior of the drum and dome of S. Astvatsatsin Church.

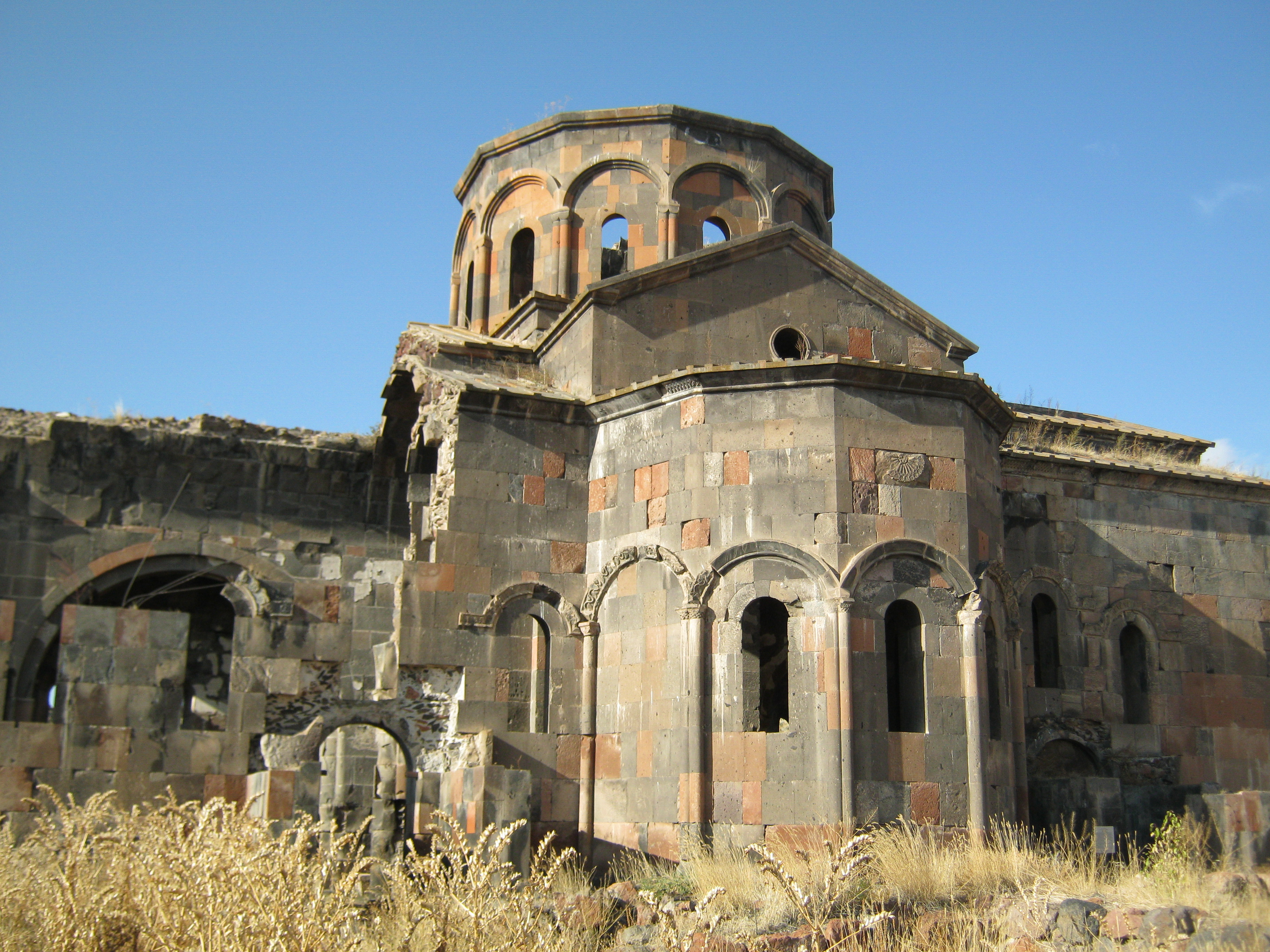

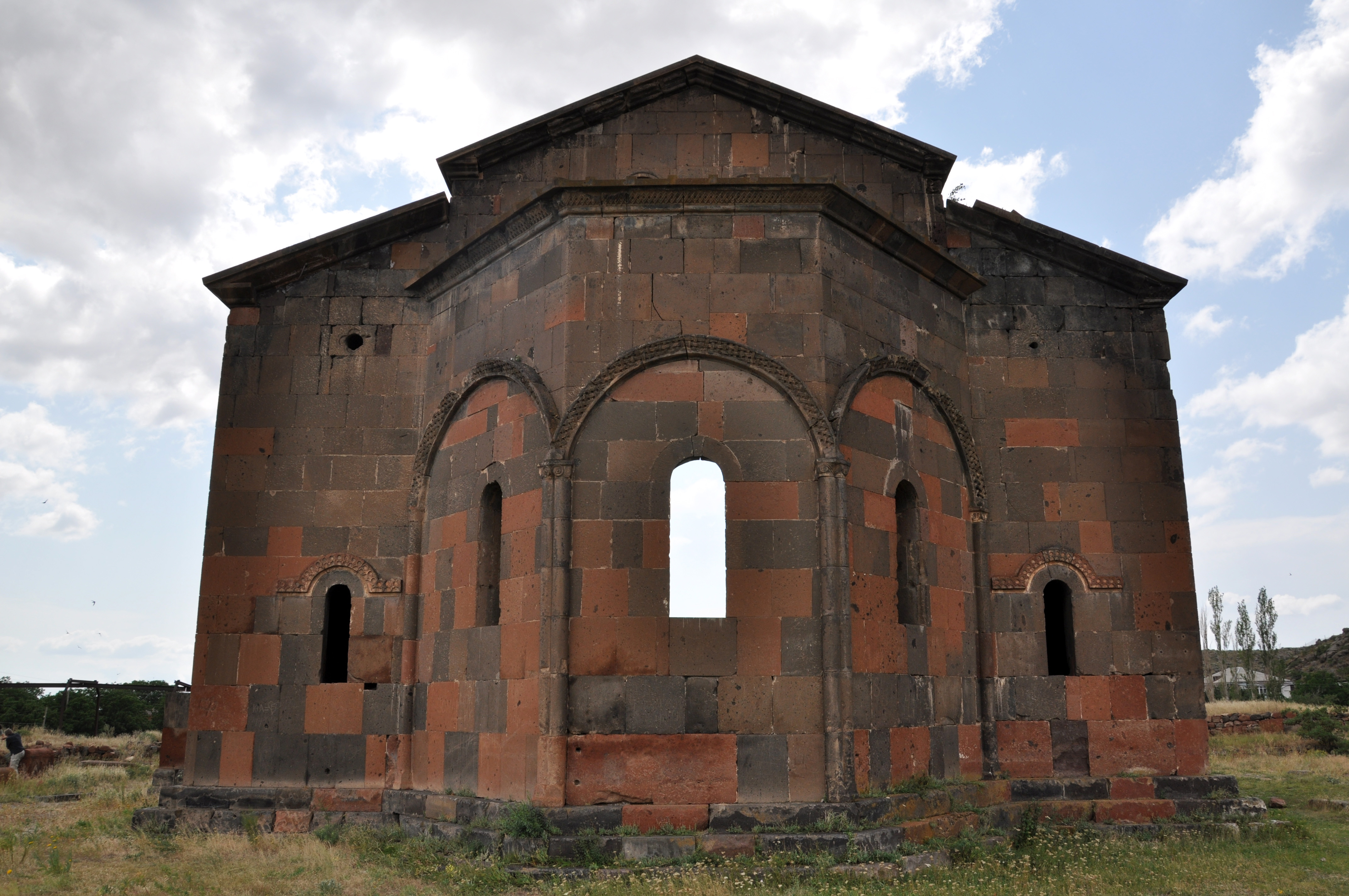

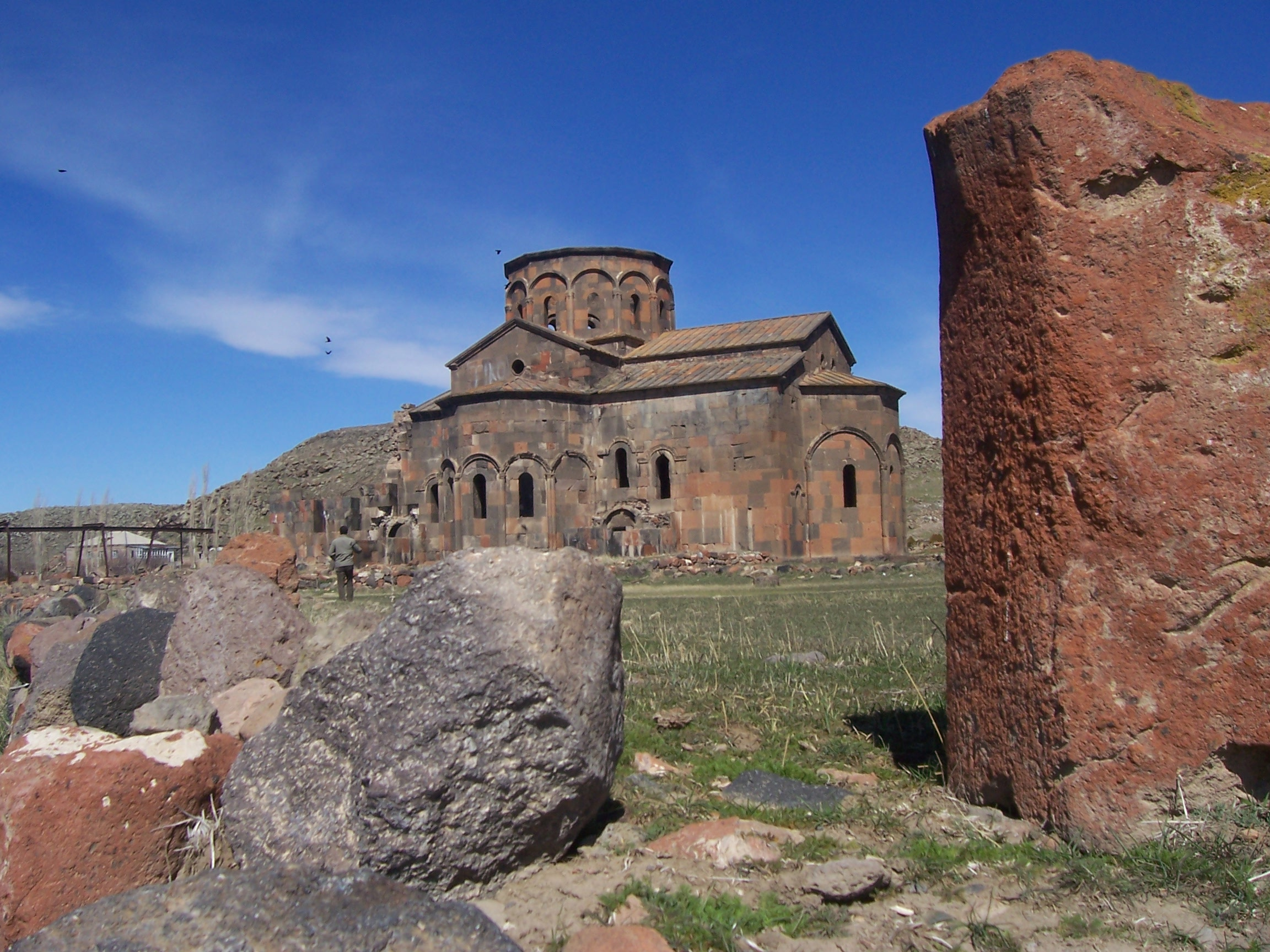

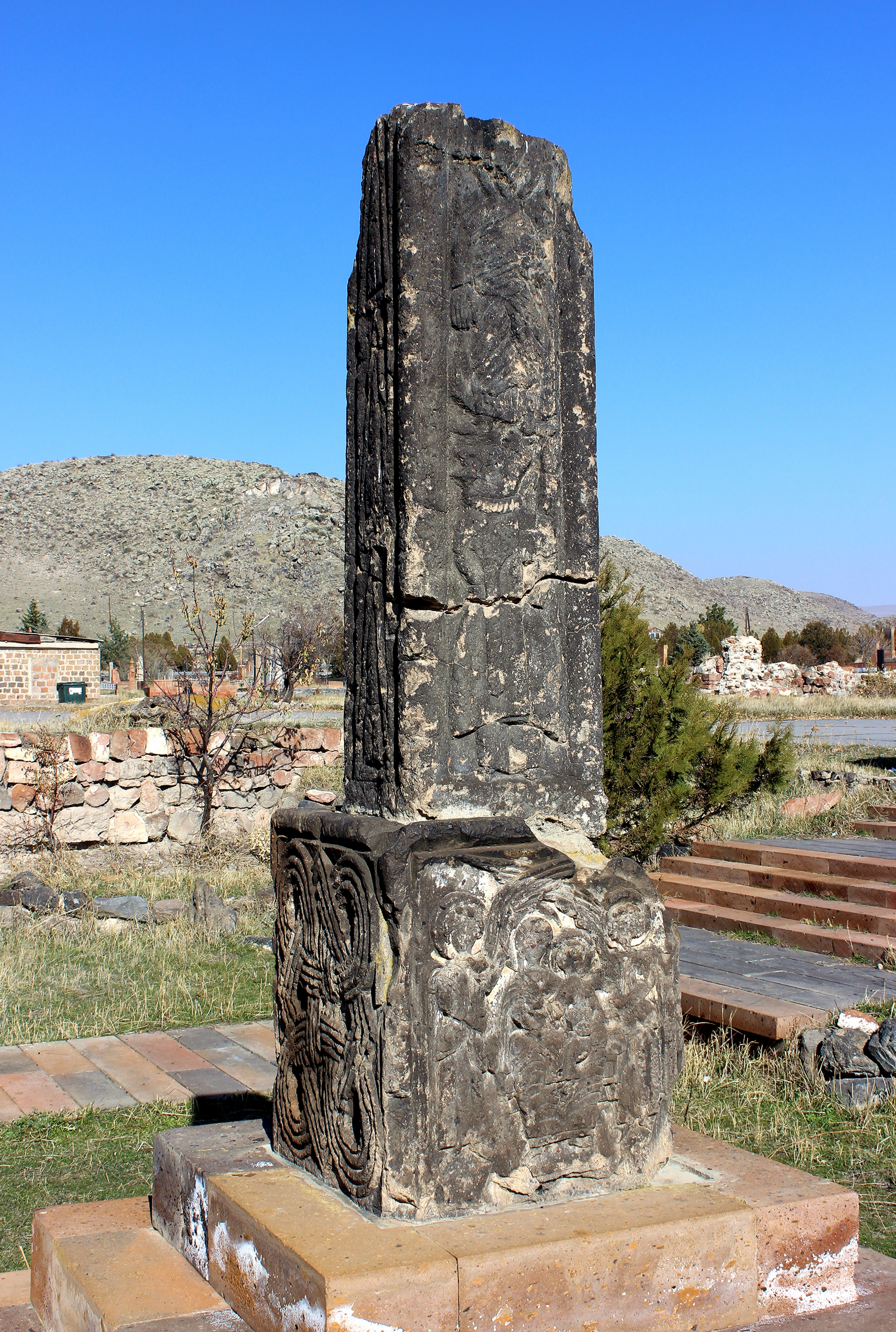
Stone pillar of S. Astvatsatsin adjacent to Kamsarakan S. Astvatsatsin Church in the Talin Cemetery.
