= Dashtadem =

Dashtadem may refer to:

- Dashtadem, Aragatsotn, Armenia
- Dashtadem, Lori, Armenia
