= Dashtadem Fortress =

Armenian fortress

Dashtadem Fortress Դաշտադեմի ամրոց
- Dashtadem, Aragatsotn Province, Armenia
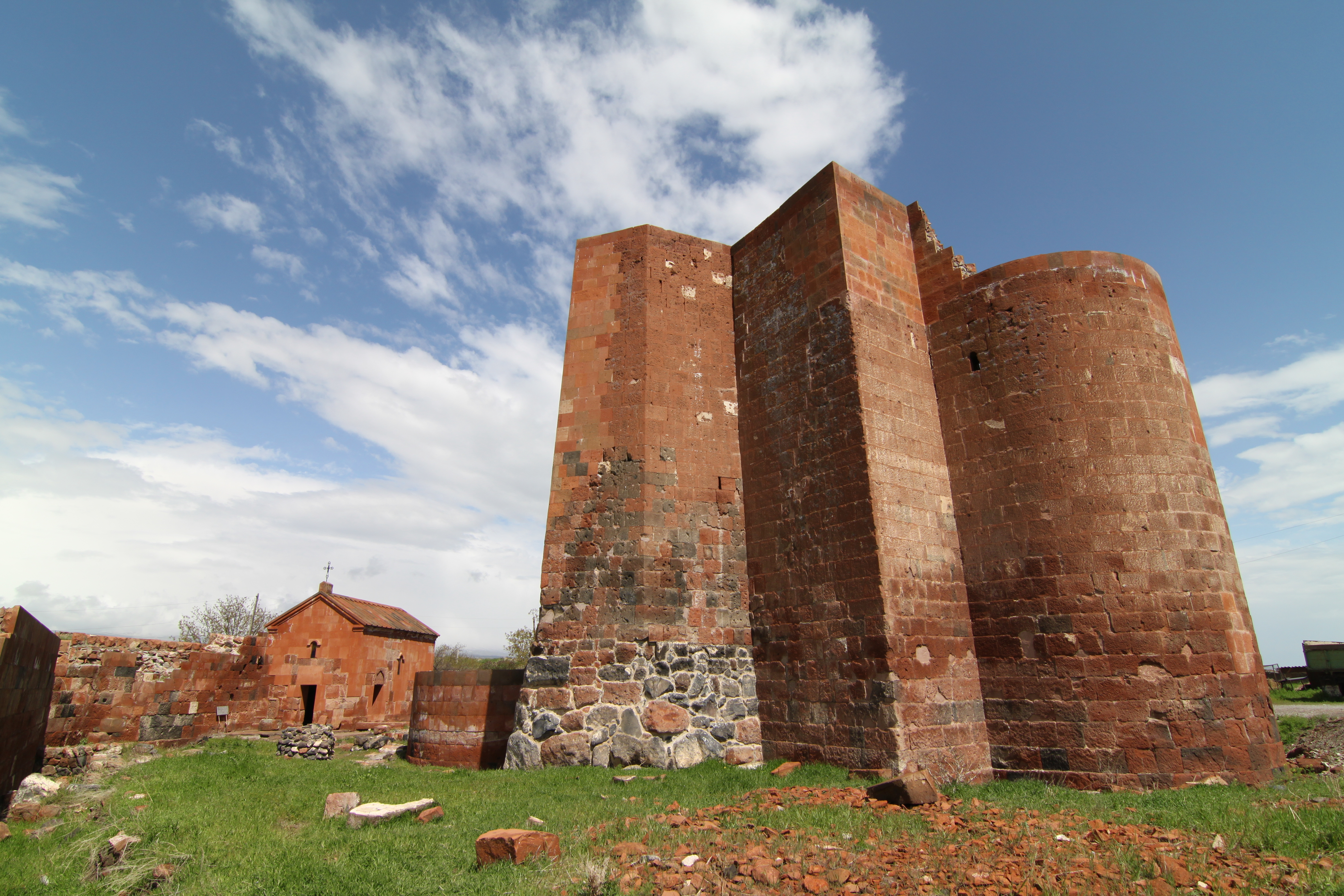
- The keep inside Dashtadem Fortress.

Site information
- Type: Fortress
- Open to the public: Yes
- Condition: Most of the exterior walls survive intact, while the interior keep and surrounding wall have been heavily restored.

Location
- Shown within Armenia Dashtadem Fortress; Դաշտադեմի ամրոց (Aragatsotn)
- Coordinates: 40.338393°N 43.856902°E

Site history
- Built: 9th-10th centuries (keep) early 19th century (enceinte)
- Materials: Stone

Dashtadem Fortress (Armenian: Դաշտադեմի ամրոց)(Qagheni fortress) is a substantial fortress of the 5th to 19th centuries located at the southern outskirts of Dashtadem village in the Aragatsotn Province of Armenia. In a cemetery 1.7 km (1.1 mi) south of Dashtadem, lies the restored 7th-century Kristapori Vank which may be viewed in the distance from the Qagheni fortress.

An octagonal walled enceinte surrounds the fortress and was constructed during the beginning of the 19th century. A continuous line of eight bastions and curtain walls encloses interior fortifications; seven regular polygonal bastions and a single semi-circular or "half-moon" bastion to the north. Where fully developed bastions consist of two faces and two flanks with fire from the flanks being able to protect the exposed curtain walls and adjacent bastions, curtain walls between the semi-circular and regular bastions at Dashtadem are angled-in slightly so that the former is protected by the adjacent projecting fortifications. The main gate requires one to enter at a right angle from the east of the northern bastion. This design prevented cavalry from charging the entry. Low-relief depictions of lions on "panels" are upon the exterior wall above the arched gateway. A low-irregular decagonal interior wall surrounds a fortress keep and an adjacent 5th-century chapel of S. Sargis. Five of the ten original semi-circular bastions remain standing. The keep consists of four semi-circular towers (12th century?) that were affixed at a later date to earlier 10th-century Armenian fortifications. Beneath the towers are large cisterns and tunnels that lead to the top of the keep. The structure has been partially renovated in recent years, while the chapel has been entirely rebuilt.

On the east wall of the fortress keep is an Arabic dedicatory inscription of 1174, written in Kufic script attributing the structure to Sultan ibn Mahmud (Shahanshah), one of the Shaddadid Princes that ruled in Ani. It reads the following passage:

Until recently, the fortress had been home to local shepherds and their families. These individuals have been displaced from the grounds while renovations have been underway.

== Gallery ==
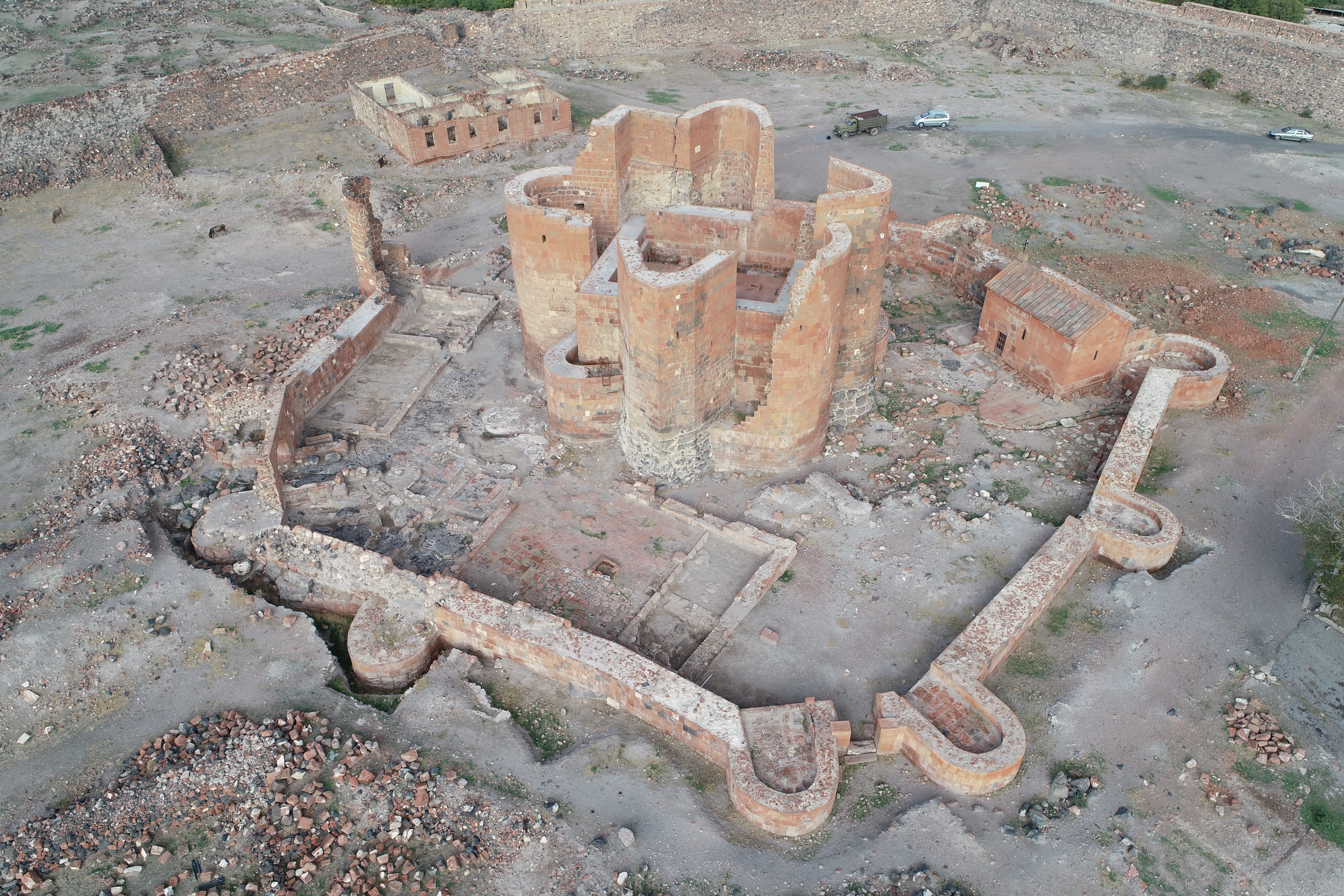

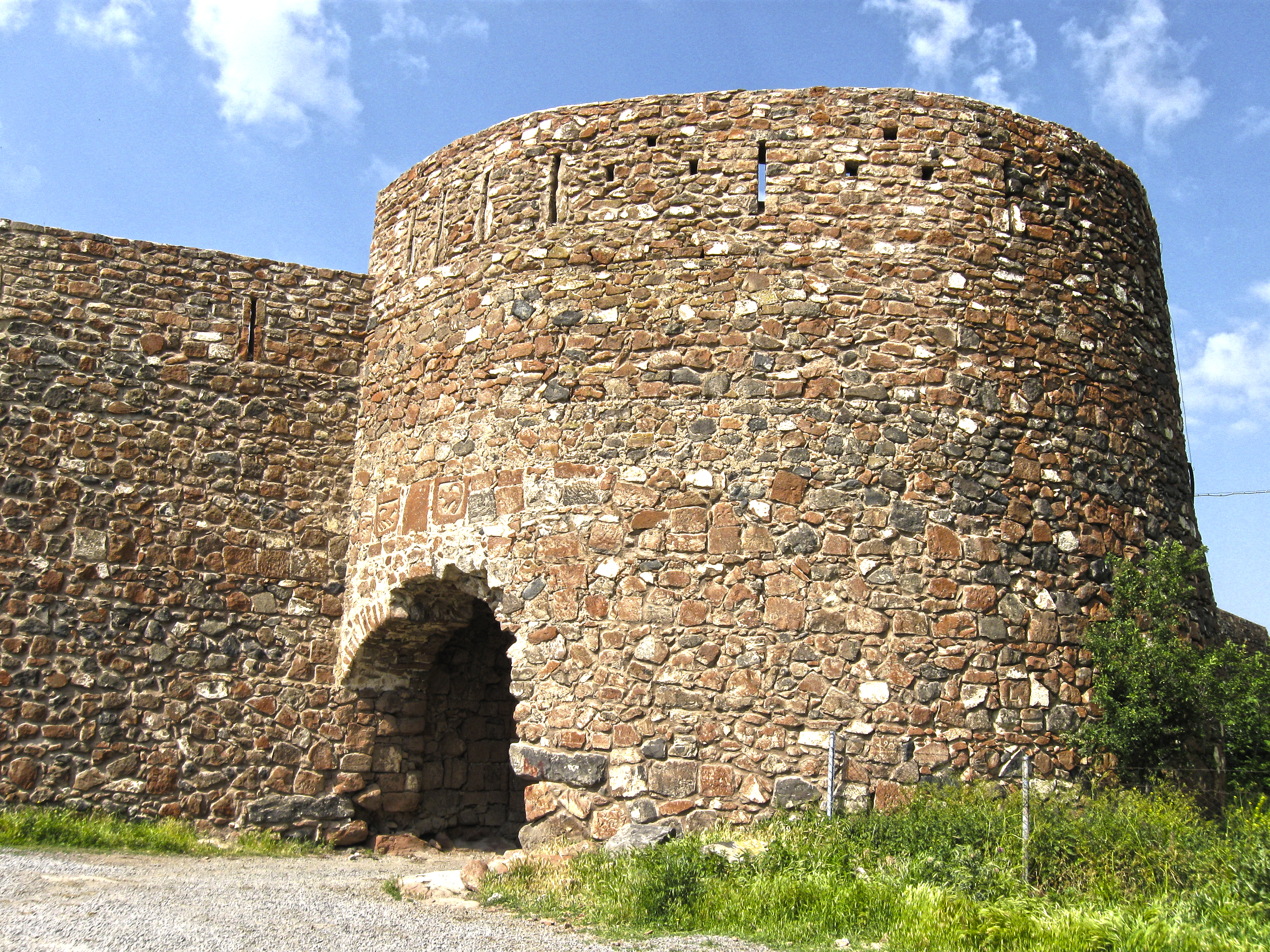
Semi-circular northern bastion and fortress gate

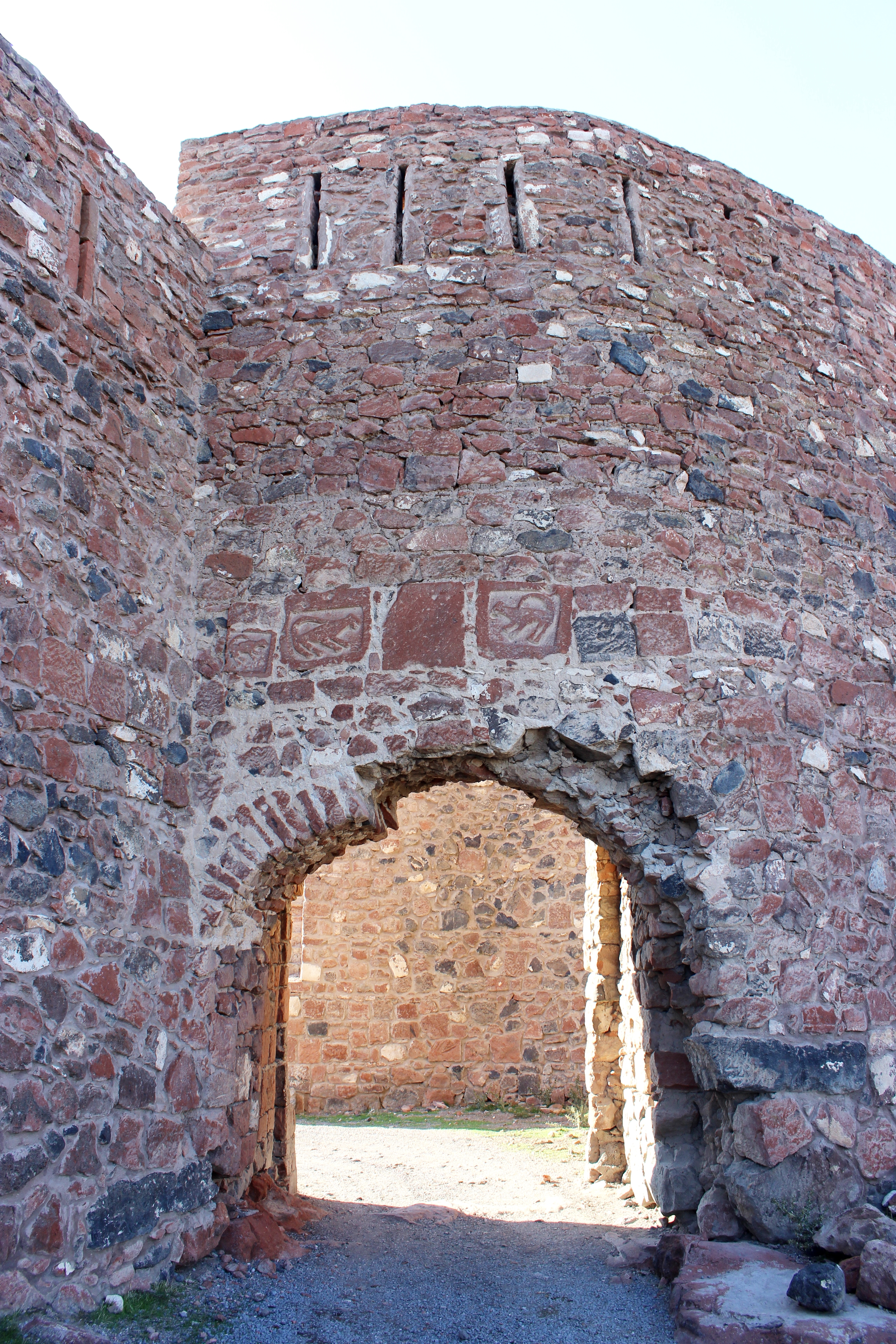
Fortress gate with depictions of lions above

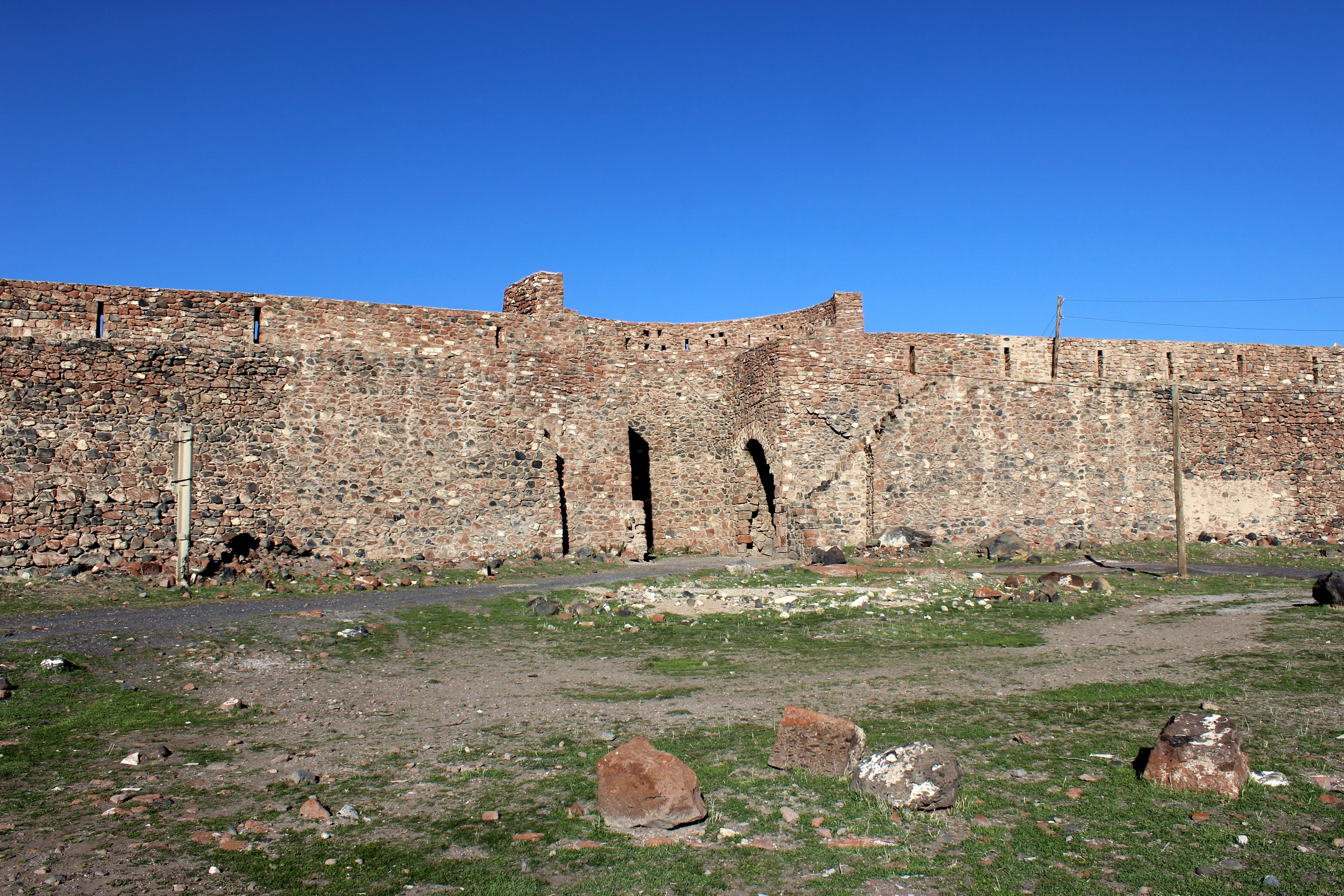
19th-century outer circuit walls

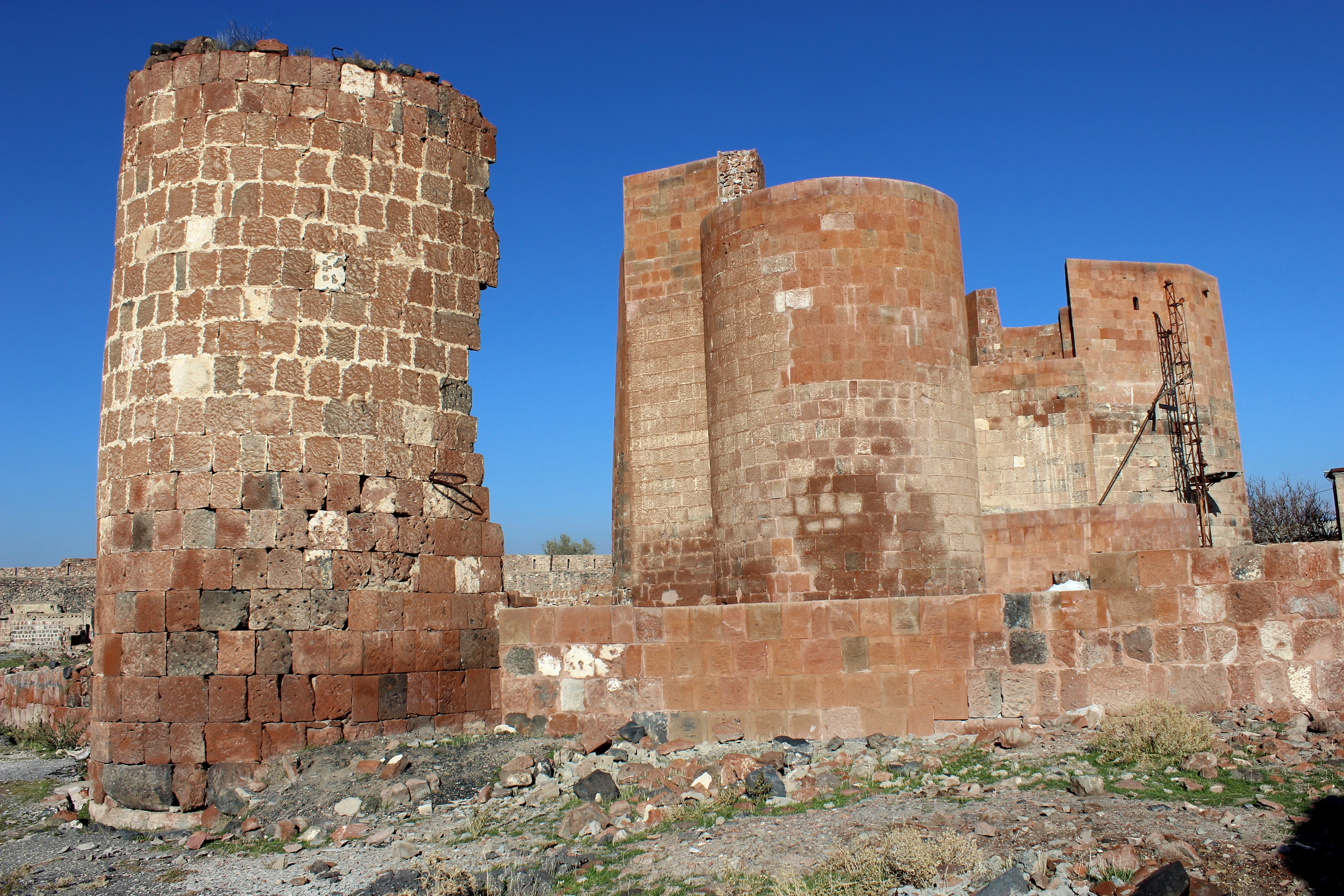
Fortress keep and inner circuit wall

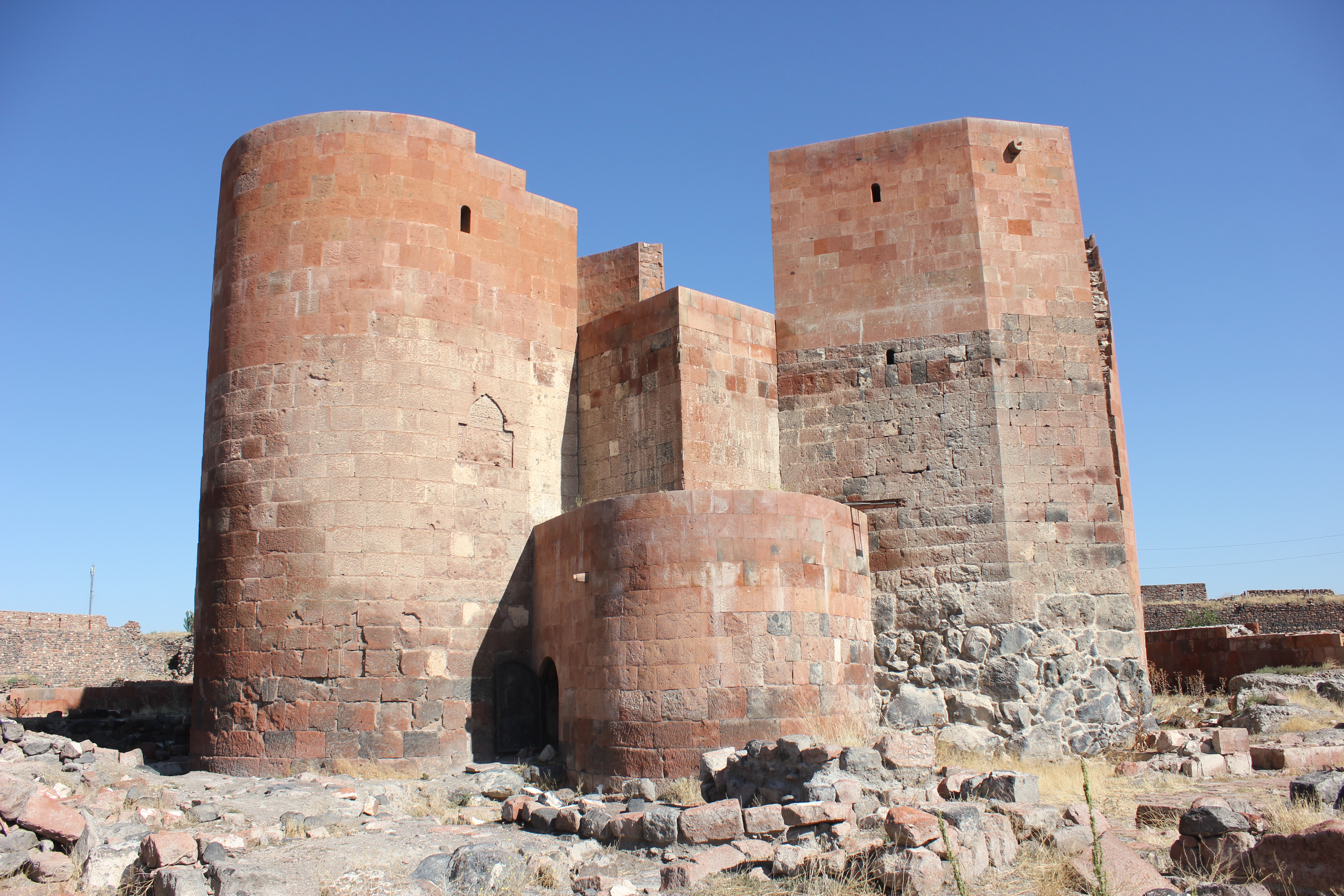

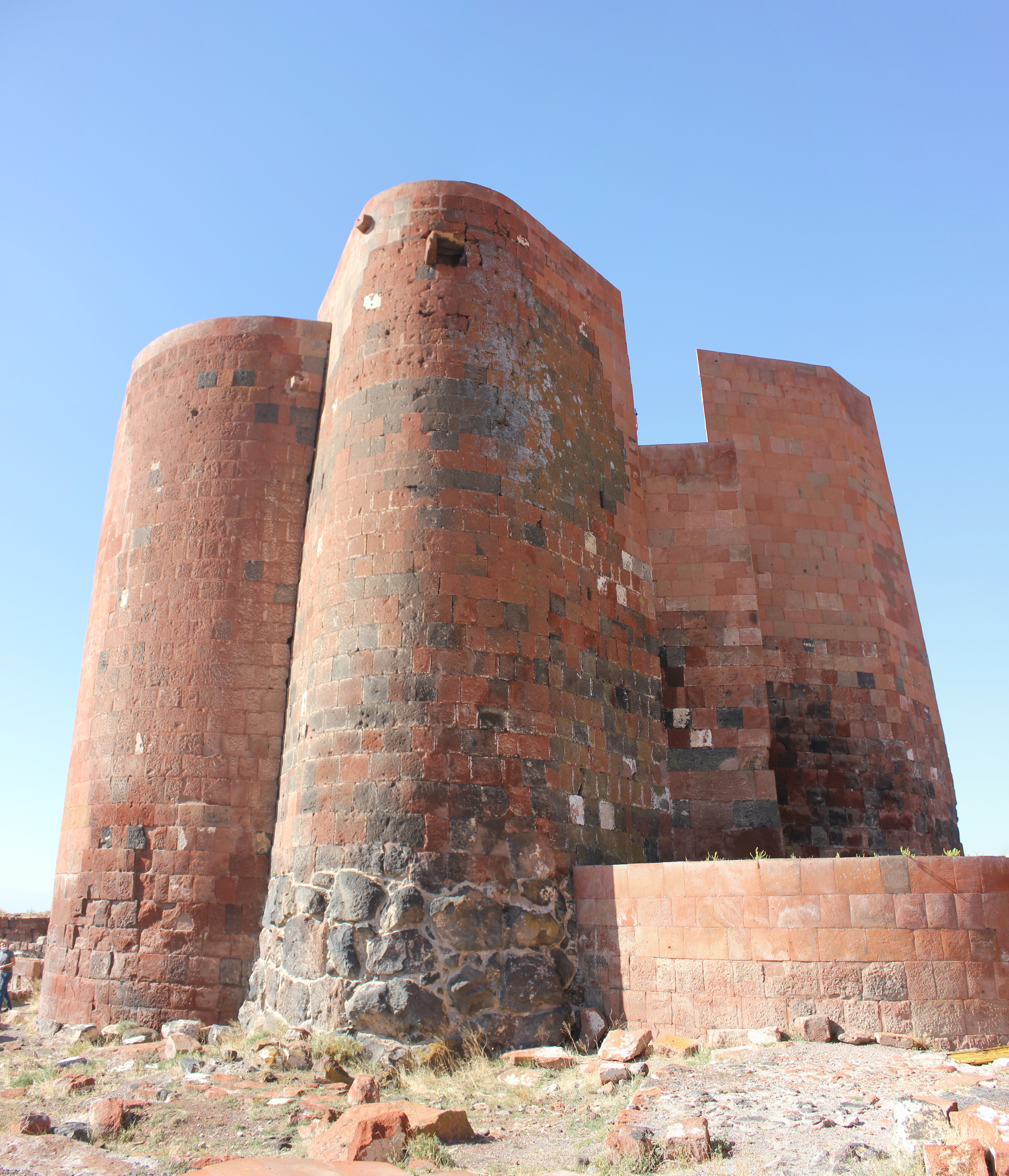

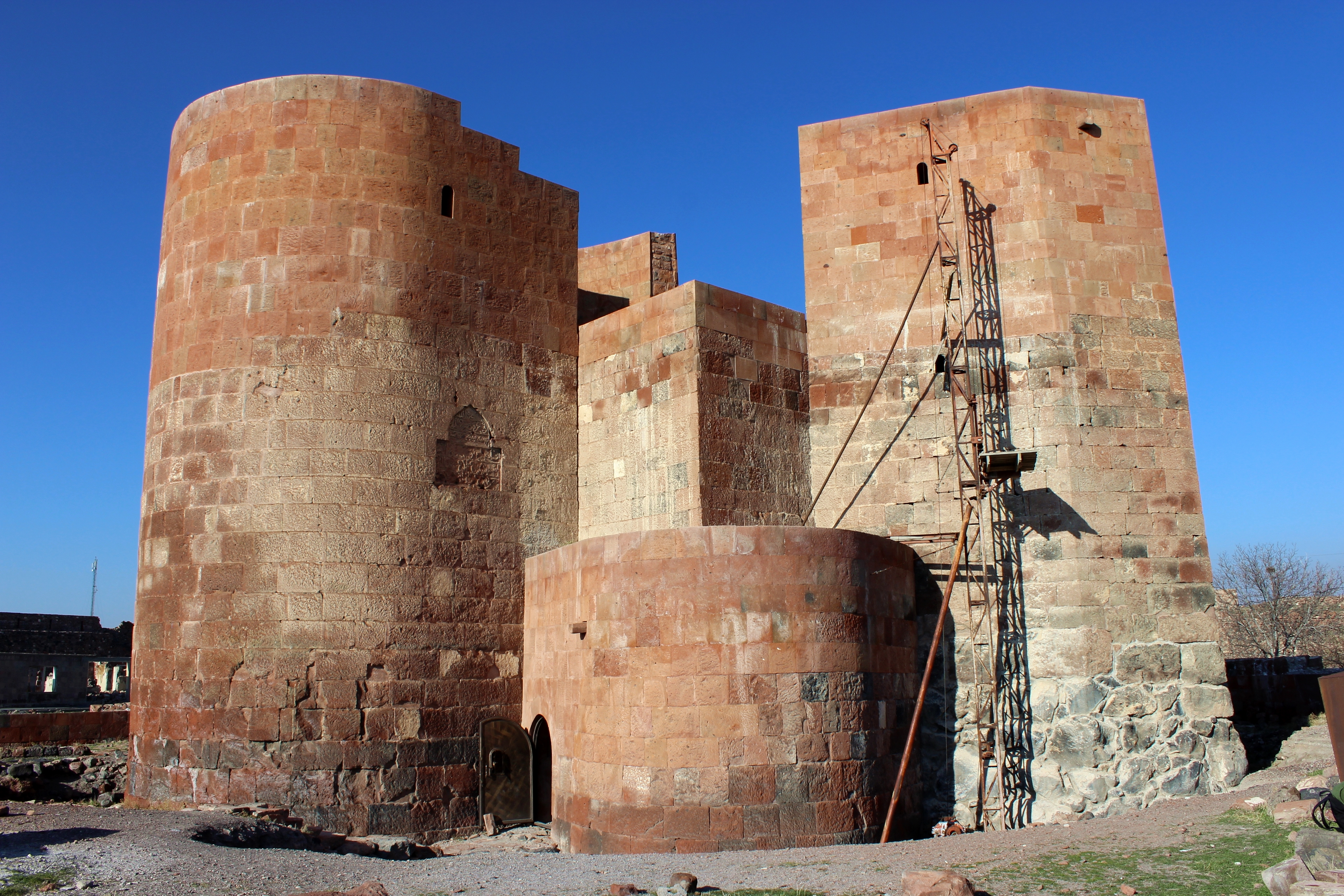
Fortress keep

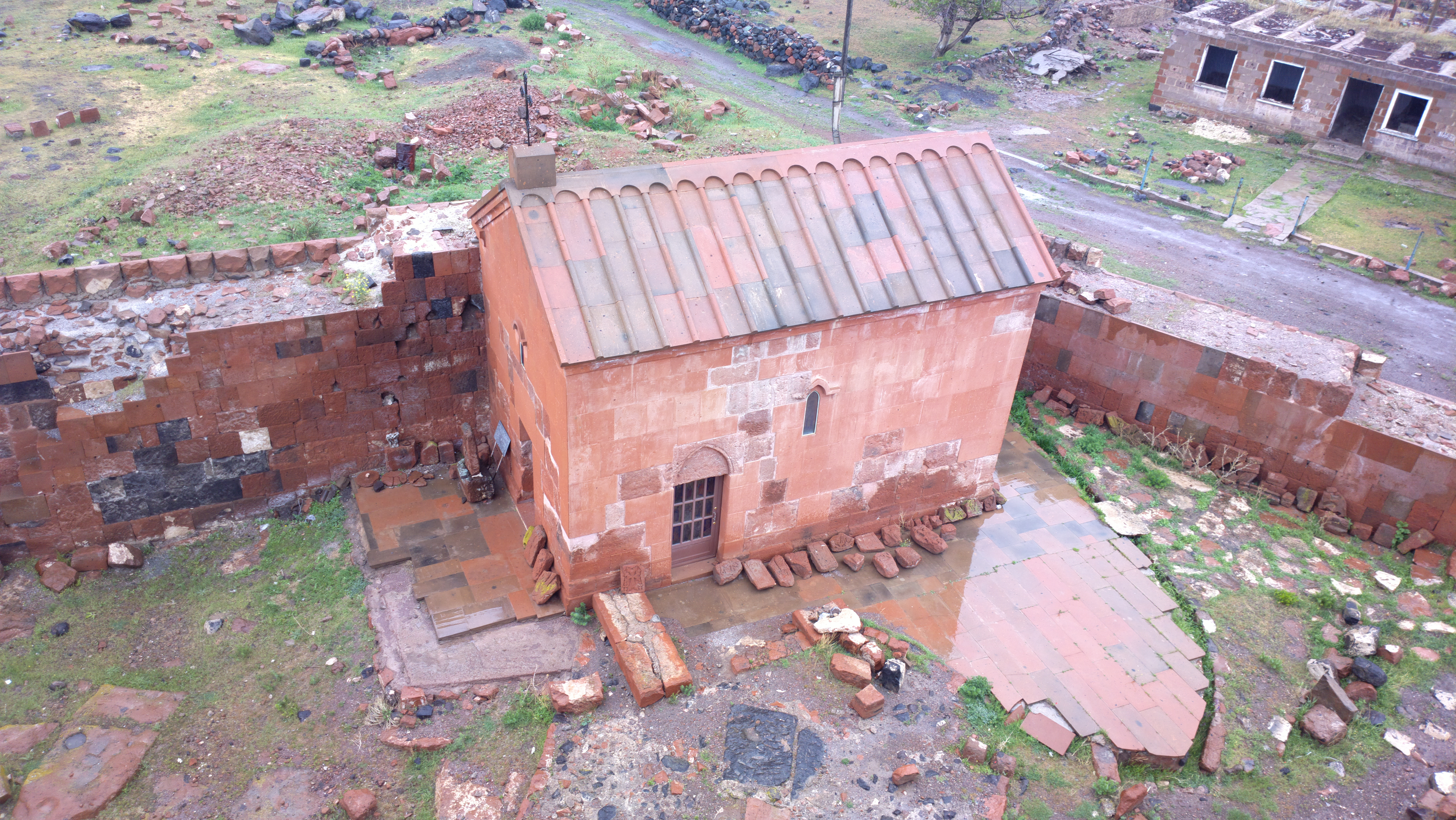

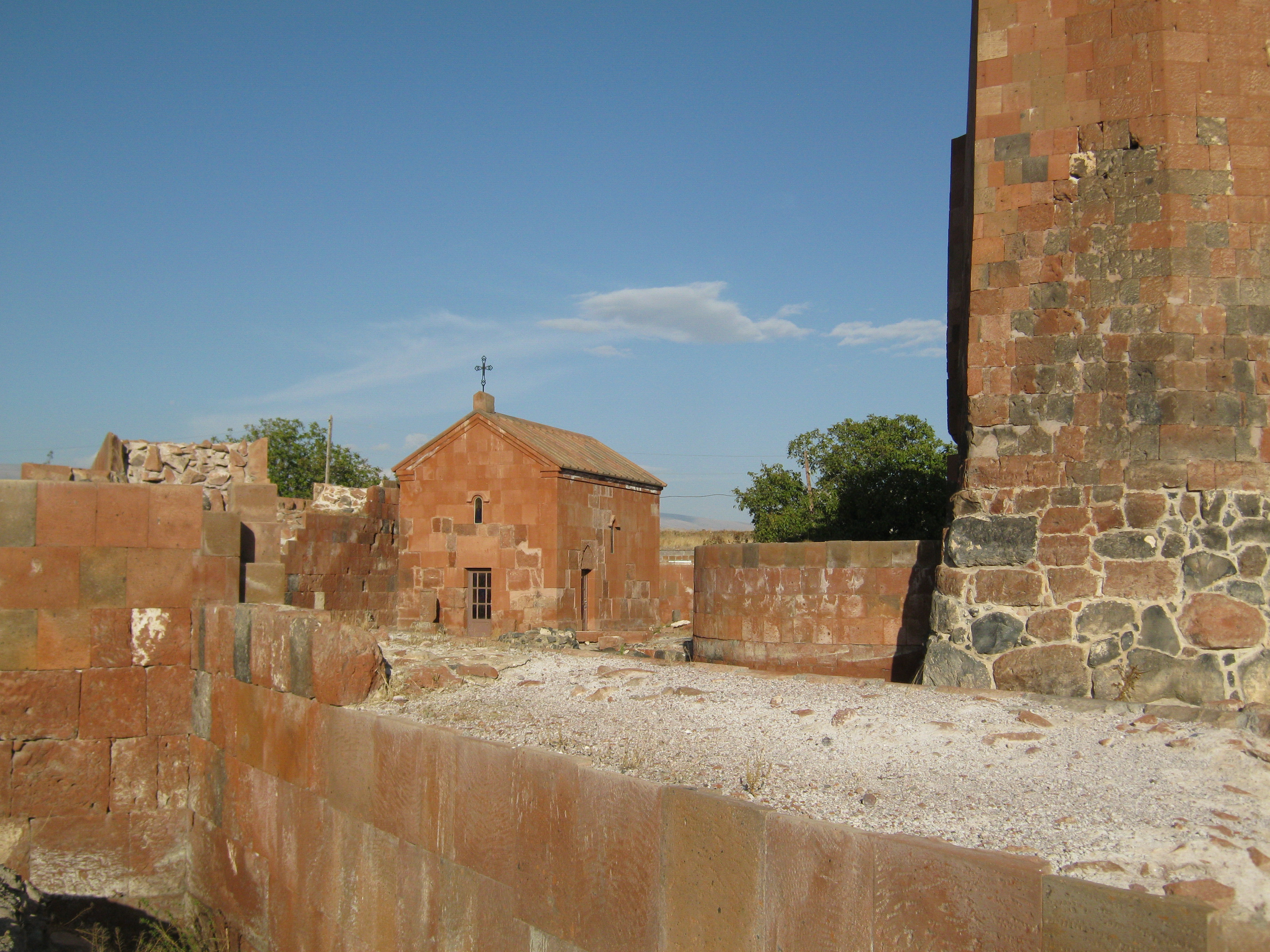
10th-century chapel

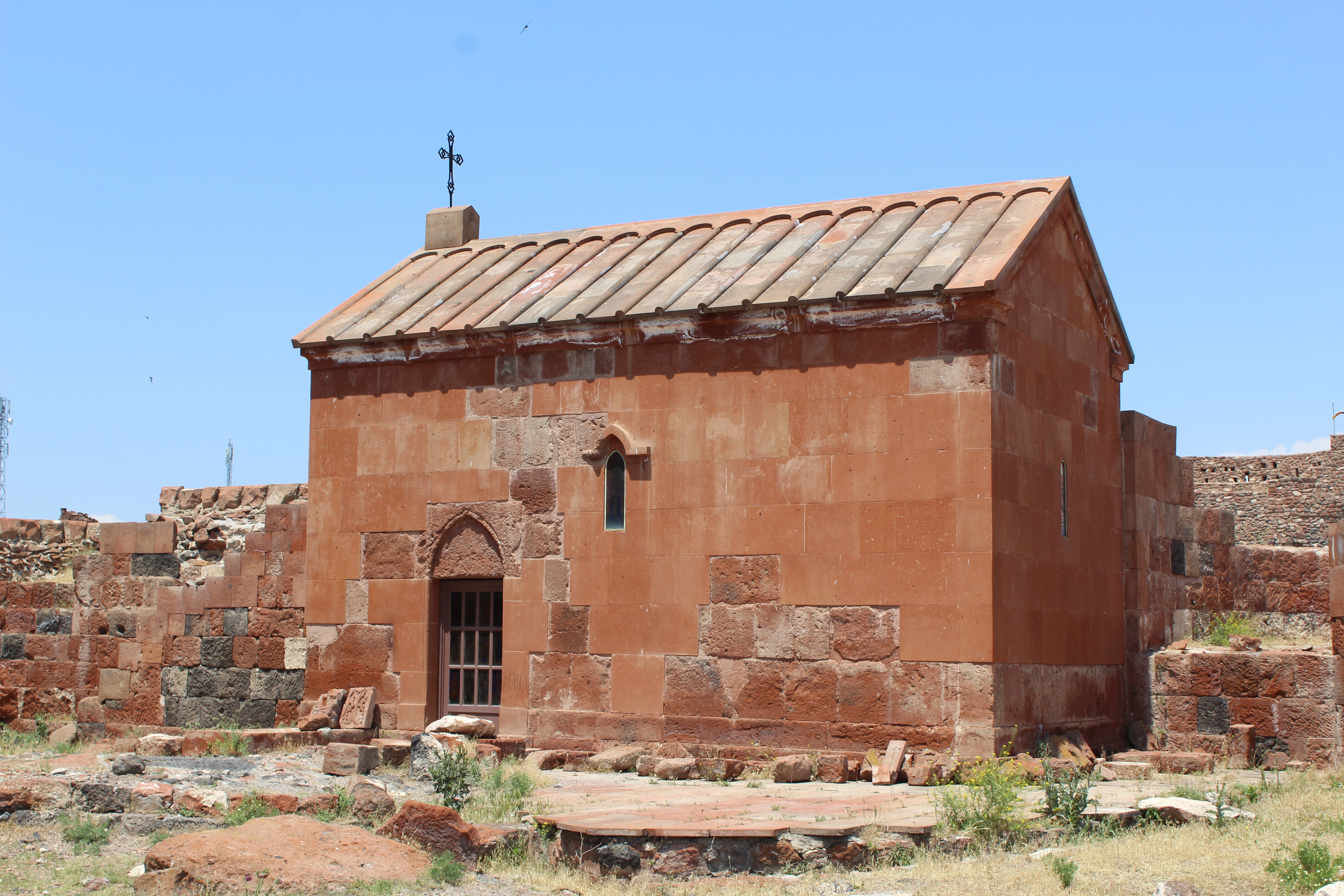

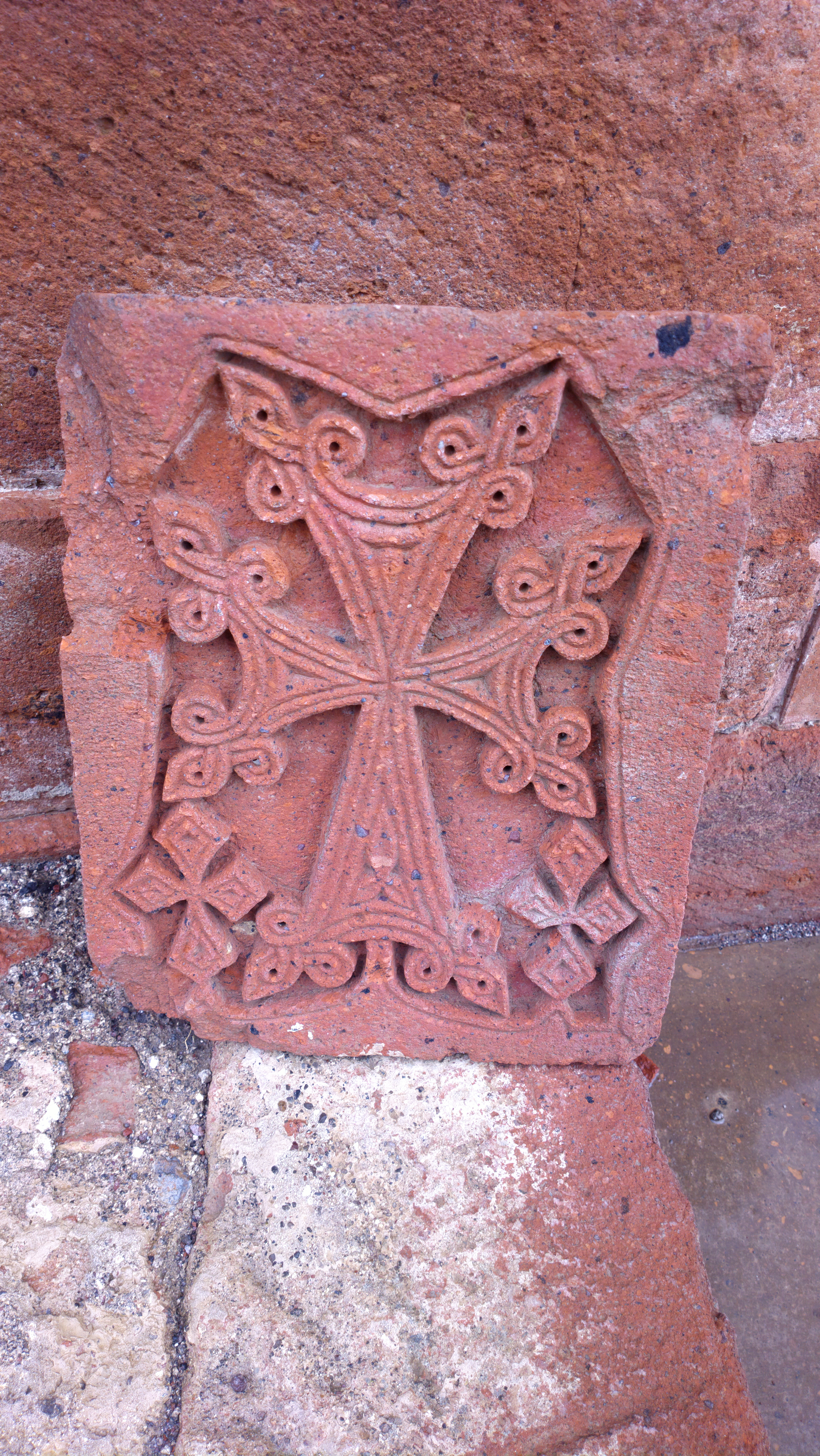

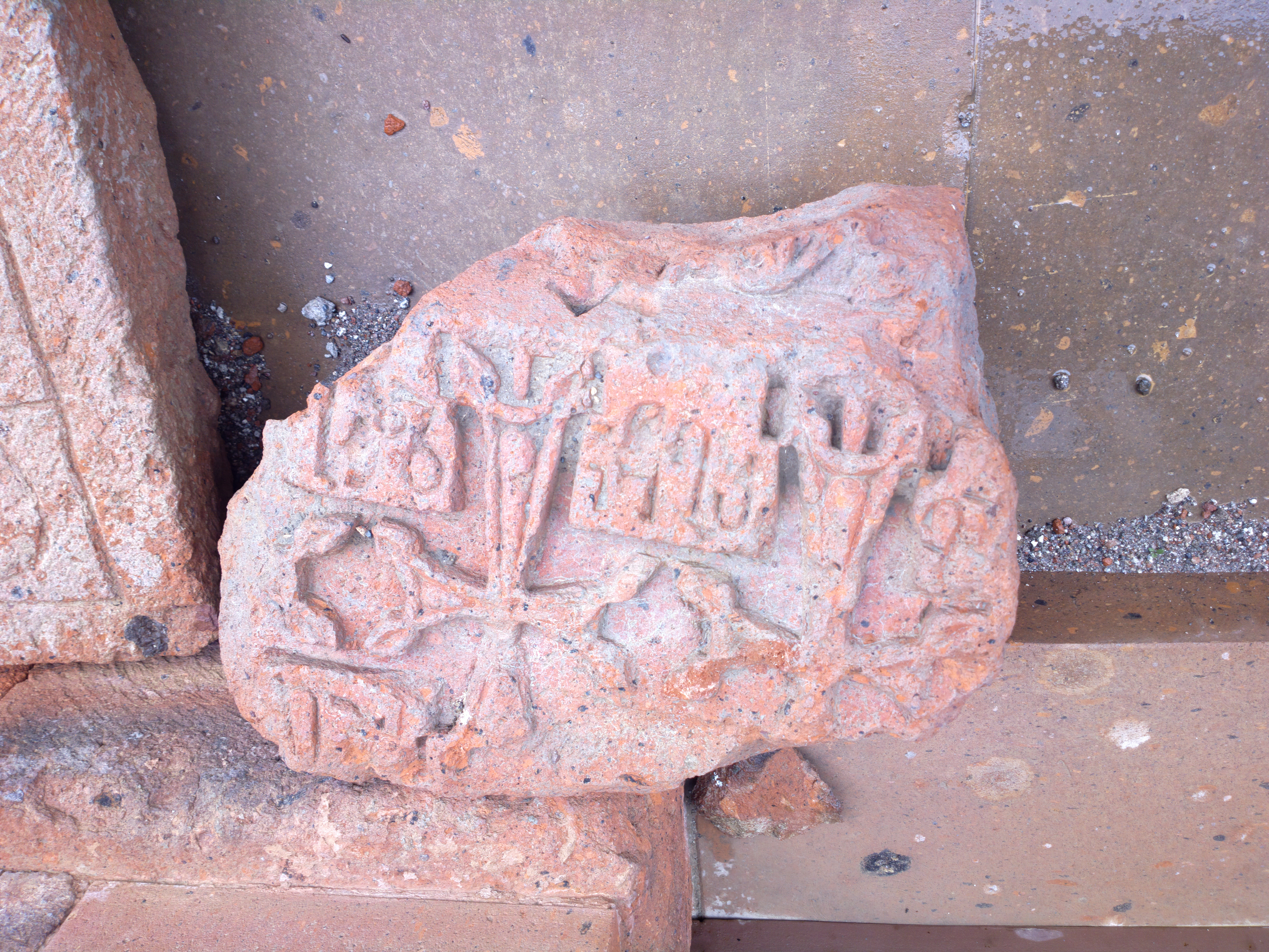
