= Saint Christopher Monastery =

Restored Armenian church of the 7th century

Saint Christopher Monastery Սուրբ Քրիստափորի վանք
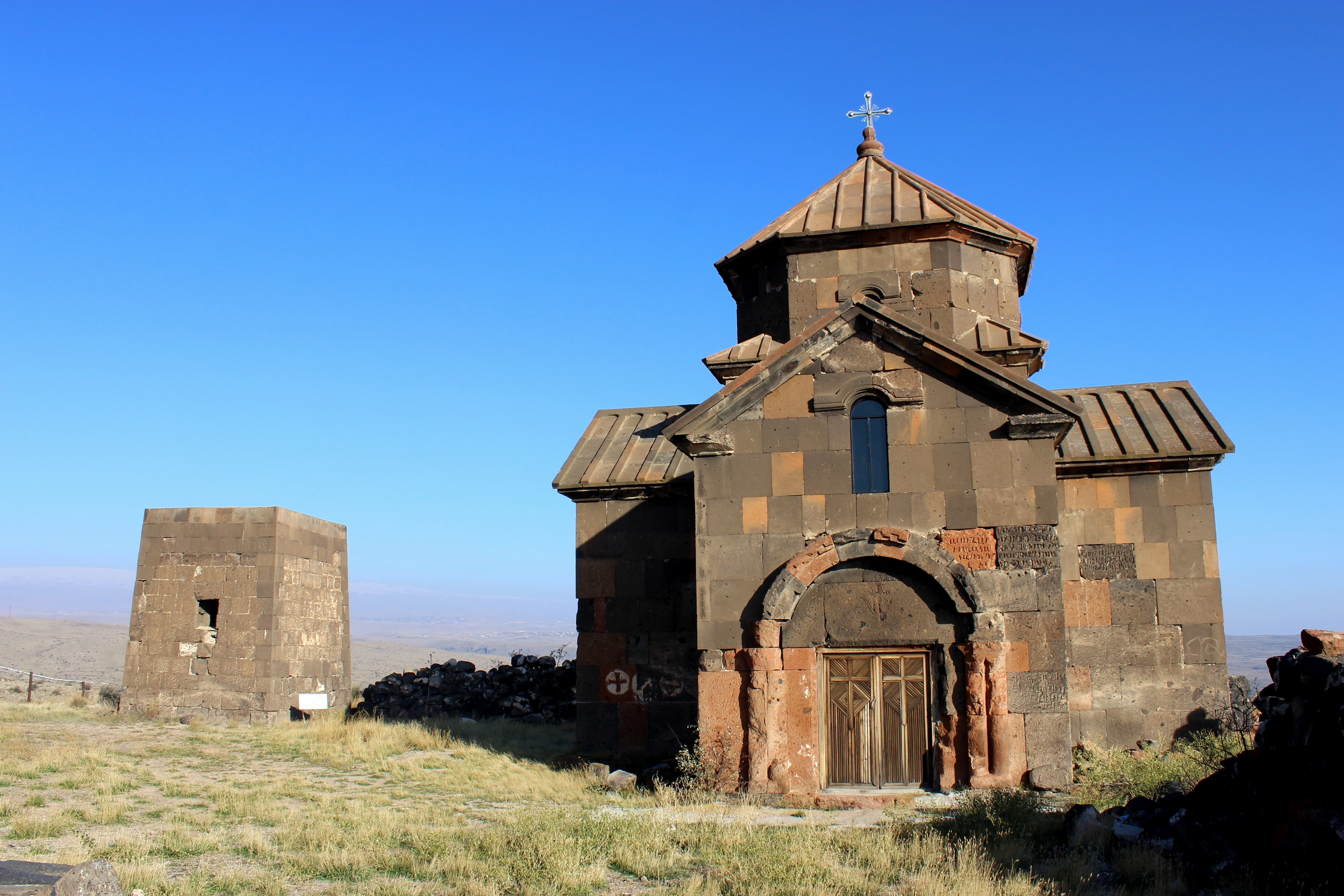
- Saint Christopher Monastery (7th-century, restored), 13th-century rectangular bell tower (left)

- Location within Armenia Location within Aragatsotn

Religion
- Affiliation: Armenian Apostolic Church
- Status: Inactive, restored

Location
- Location: Dashtadem, Aragatsotn Province, Armenia
- Coordinates: 40.322975°N 43.859398°E

Architecture
- Type: Small cruciform central-plan
- Style: Armenian
- Completed: 7th-century, with a 13th-century rectangular bell tower/funerary tower (north)

Specifications
- Direction of façade: west
- Dome: 1

Saint Christopher Monastery (Armenian: Սուրբ Քրիստափորի վանք) is a restored Armenian church of the 7th century, located in a cemetery 2.2 kilometres (1.4 mi) southeast of the outskirts of Dashtadem village and Dashtadem Fortress in the Aragatsotn Province of Armenia. Adjacent to the church (north) is a 13th-century stone rectangular tower (bell/defensive/funerary) with sloped walls. It has small windows on the upper portion of the wall, but no access to the interior. The surrounding cemetery has been in use from the 6th century to modern times, and contains several khachkars. A low-stone wall surrounds the complex and a section of the old cemetery. Dashtadem Fortress may be seen in the distance from the monastery.

== Architecture ==
=== Surb Nshan Church ===
The Church of Surp Nshan is constructed of orange and gray tuff stone. Some of the stones on the southern and western exterior façades bear inscriptions in Armenian. A single compound dome is centered above the main body of the church, with an octagonal façade around the drum and dome. Light penetrates the interior of the structure via four small windows positioned around the drum, and two slightly larger windows above the entry and the semi-circular apse to the east. A portal to the west serves as the only entrance to the interior. Low-relief pairs of decorative columns stand at either side of the exterior of the entry, supporting a semi-circular arched lintel. The lintel has dentil ornamentation lining its outer edge. The interior of the church is unadorned and reminiscent of Kamsarakan S. Astvatsatsin Church found in the nearby village of Talin, within the Talin Cathedral complex.

== Gallery ==
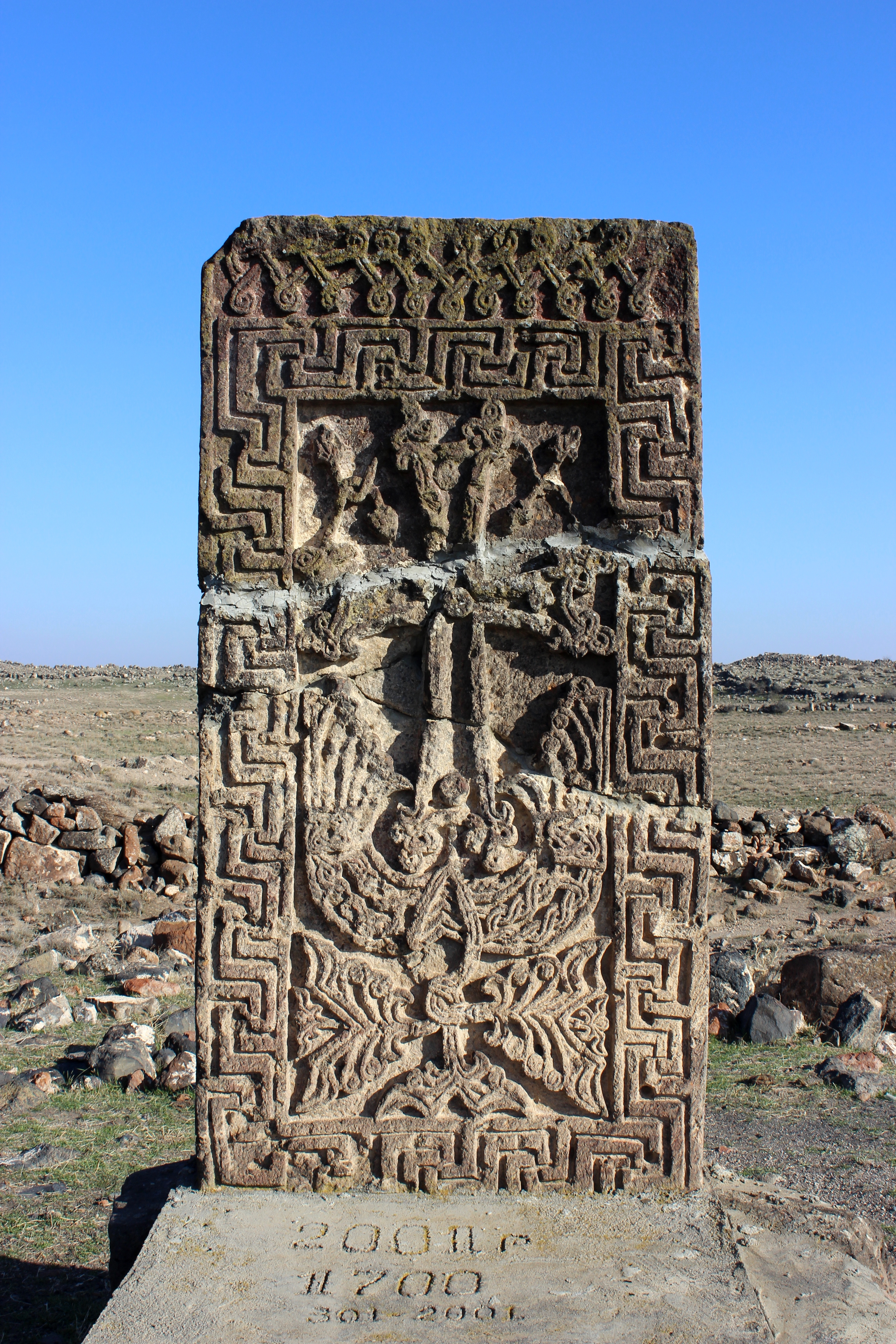
Large khachkar along the road leading to the monastery

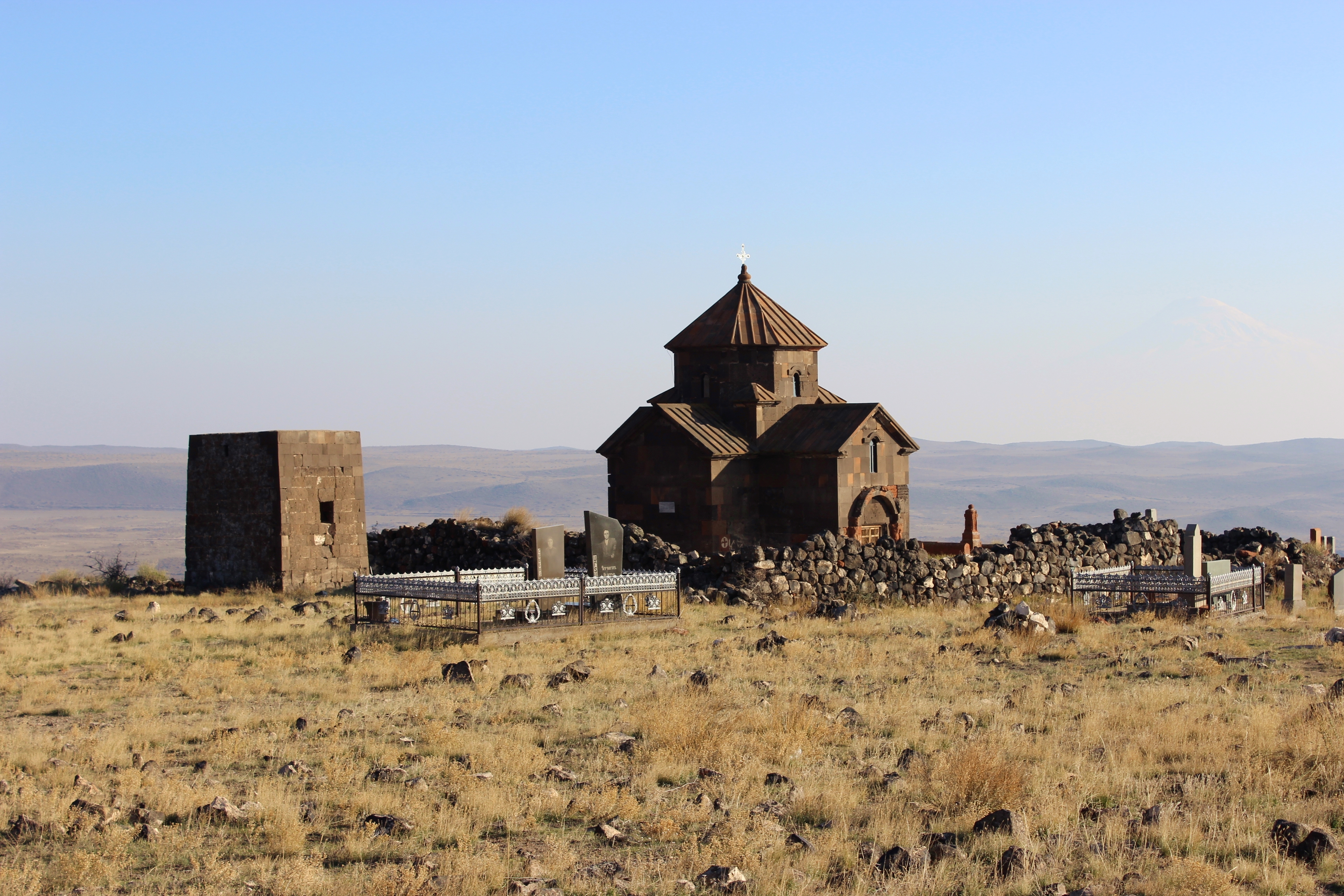
General view of the Monastery

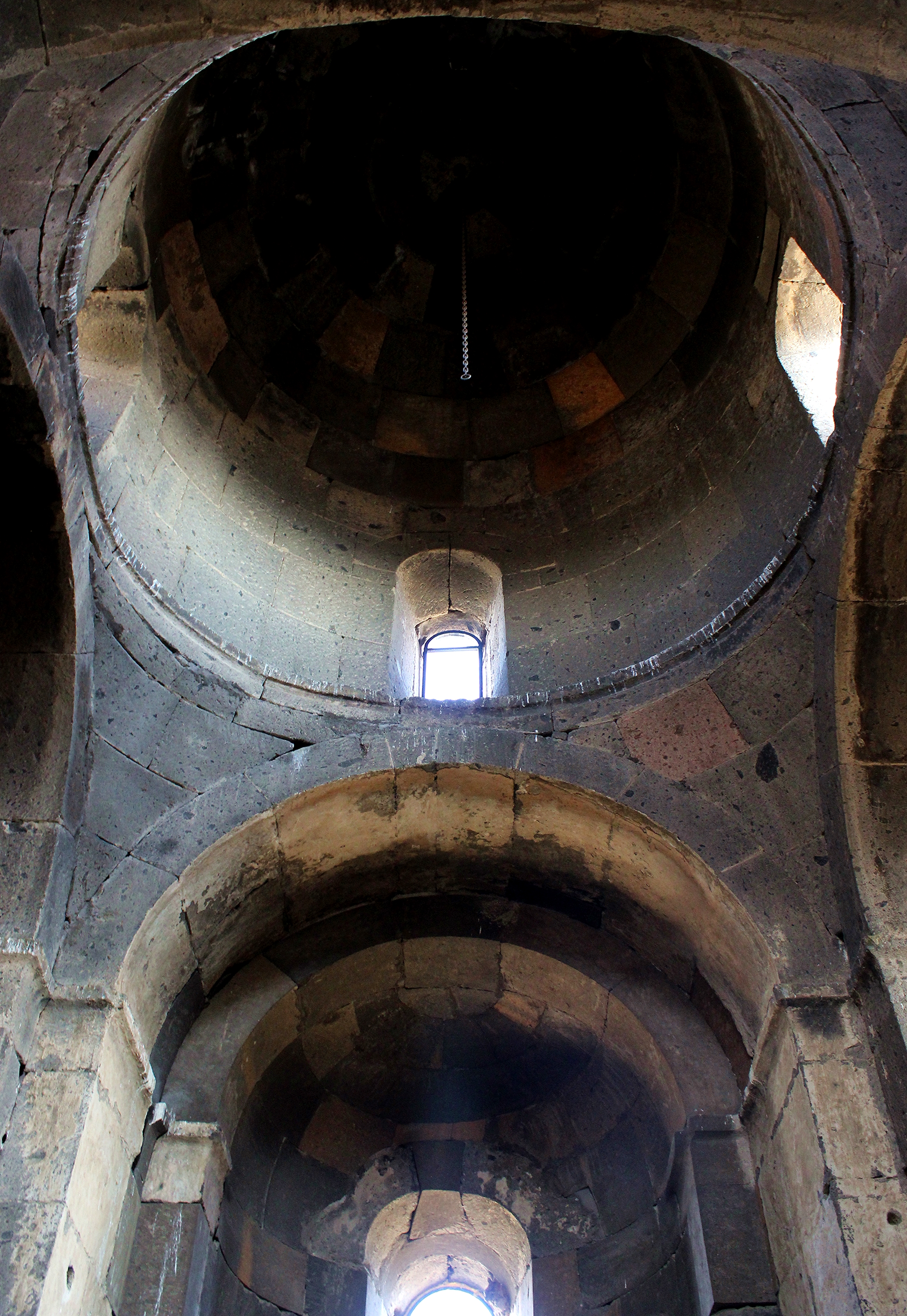
Church drum and dome interior
