= Dashtadem, Aragatsotn =

Village in Aragatsotn, Armenia

Dashtadem Դաշտադեմ
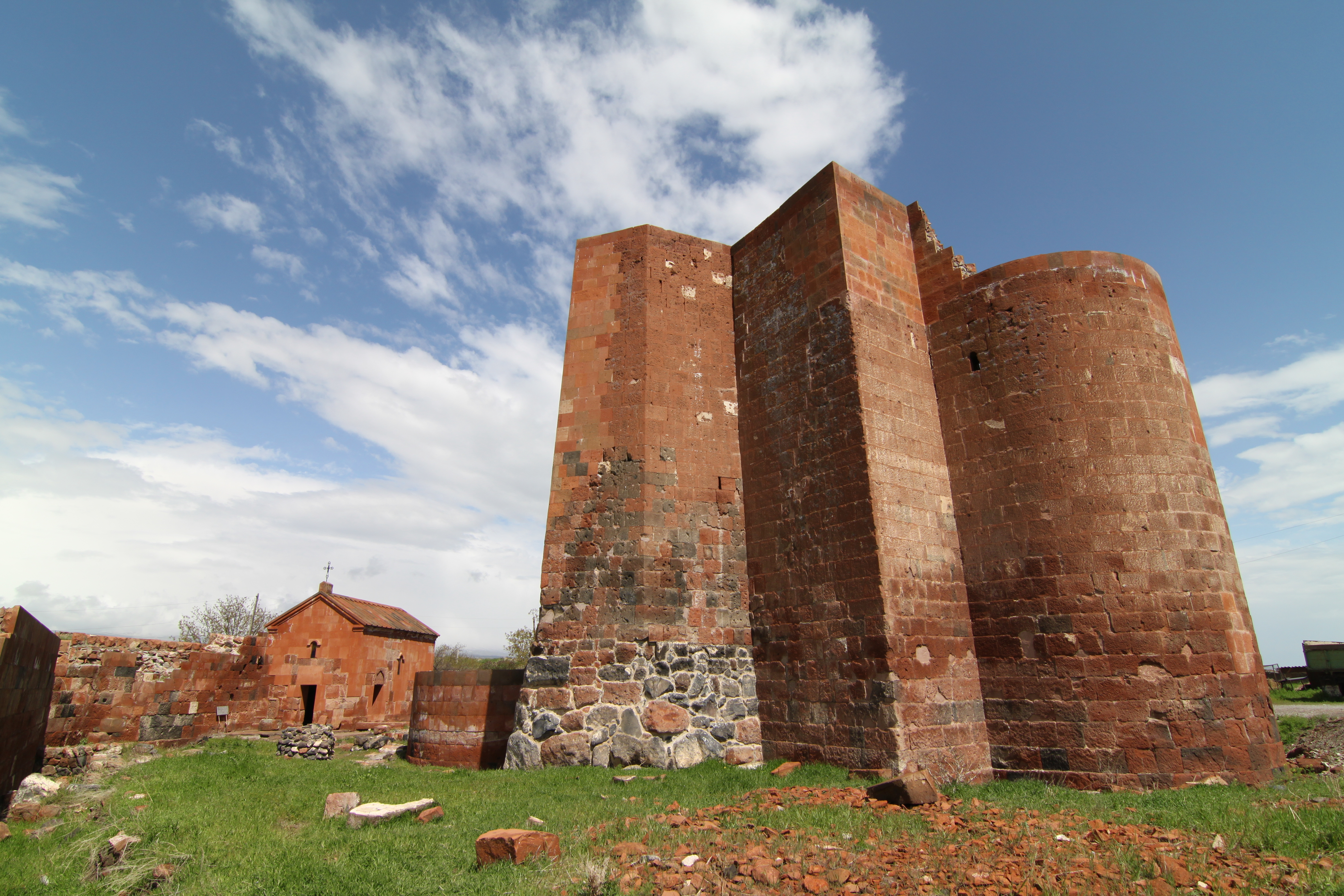
- The keep inside Dashtadem Fortress.

- Location within Armenia Location within Aragatsotn
- Coordinates: 40°20′40.126″N 43°51′32.676″E
- Country: Armenia
- Province: Aragatsotn
- Municipality: Talin

Area
  - Total: 0.73 km^{2} (0.28 sq mi)
- Elevation: 1,458 m (4,783 ft)

Population (2011)
  - Total: 548
  - Density: 750/km^{2} (1,900/sq mi)
- Time zone: UTC+4
  - Summer (DST): UTC+5

Dashtadem (Armenian: Դաշտադեմ) is a village in the Talin Municipality of the Aragatsotn Province of Armenia. As of 2023, the village had a population of 580.

== Name ==
The name Dashtadem is composed of the Armenian words dasht 'field' and dem 'facing, in front of', thus literally meaning 'facing the field'. The village's official name was Nerkin Talin ('Lower Talin') until 1979, when it was renamed Dashtadem after a village in the region of Sasun in Western Armenia. It was previously also referred to as Turki Talin ('Turkish Talin'), Talin Nor ('New Talin') and Talin Pokr ('Little Talin'), whereas the nearby settlement of Talin was sometimes called Hayi Talin ('Armenian Talin').

== History ==
In medieval and preceding times, the village was inhabited by Armenians. In the 18th and 19th centuries, the village was inhabited mainly by Turkic-speakers (later called Azerbaijanis). The population became exclusively Armenian in the early 20th century. Some of its inhabitants are descended from refugees from different parts of Western (Ottoman) Armenia, such as Mush, Alashkert (Eleşkirt) and Bulanık.

According to some sources, the ruins located on the southwestern edge of the village are those of the historical Armenian village of Kaghin, which is mentioned in medieval sources. The village contains the large Dashtadem Fortress dating to the 10th century but substantially rebuilt in the 19th century, along with a chapel dedicated to Saint Sargis also dating to the 10th century. The fortress keep has an Arabic dedicatory inscription of 1174, written in Kufic script attributing the structure to Sultan ibn Mahmud (Shahanshah), one of the Shaddadids. Past the village to the north just east of the road to Talin, and a few hundred meters before the electric substation (south), are the ruins of a large medieval caravanserai. Large sections of walls remain standing, and the overall plan is still easily distinguished amongst the ruins. The remains of Stone Age obsidian workshops can be found on a hill to the west. In a cemetery south of Dashtadem lies the restored 7th-century Saint Christopher Monastery.

== Gallery ==
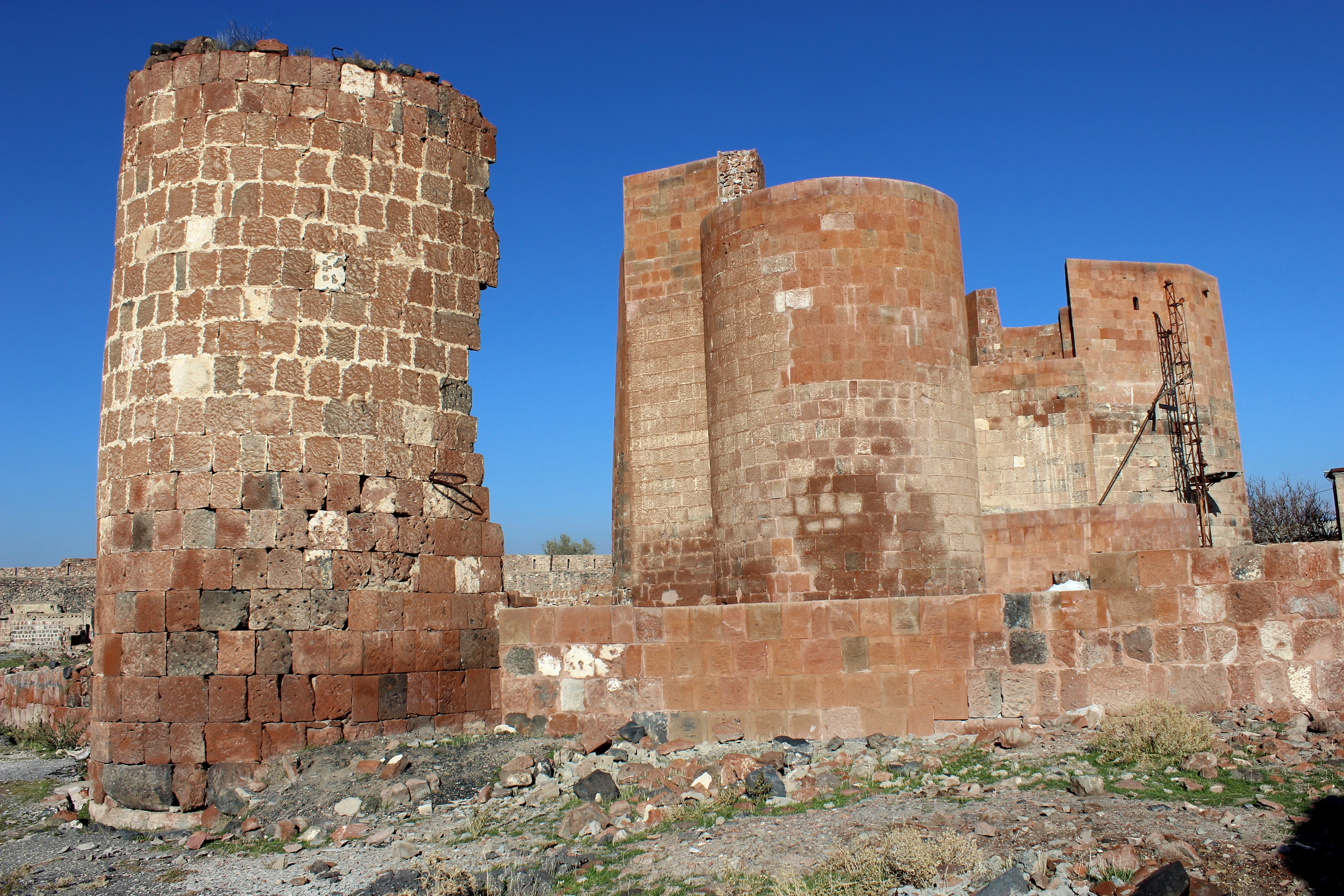
The keep at Dashtadem Fortress, 10th century

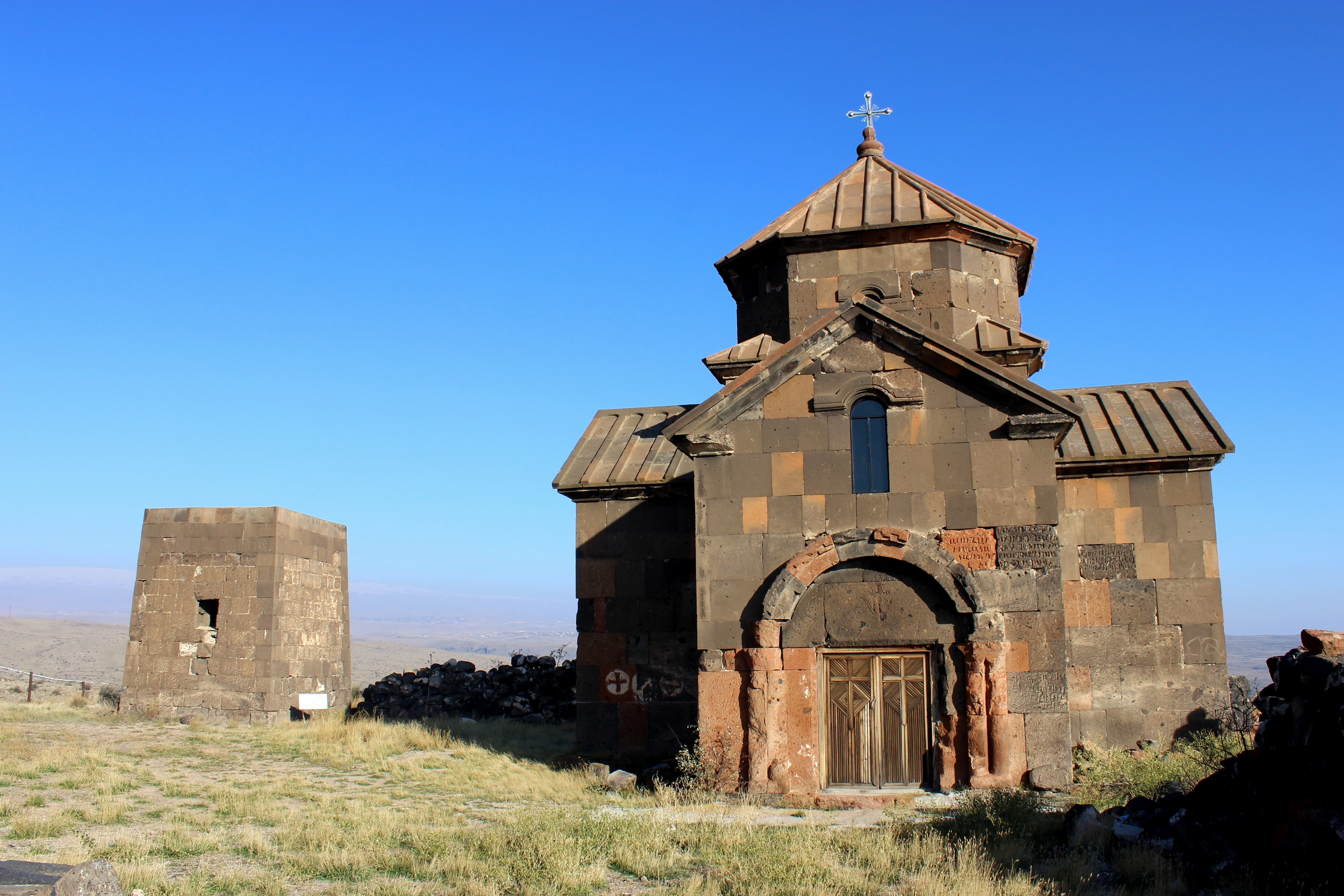
Kristapori Vank (7th century, restored) with 13th-century rectangular bell tower (left)

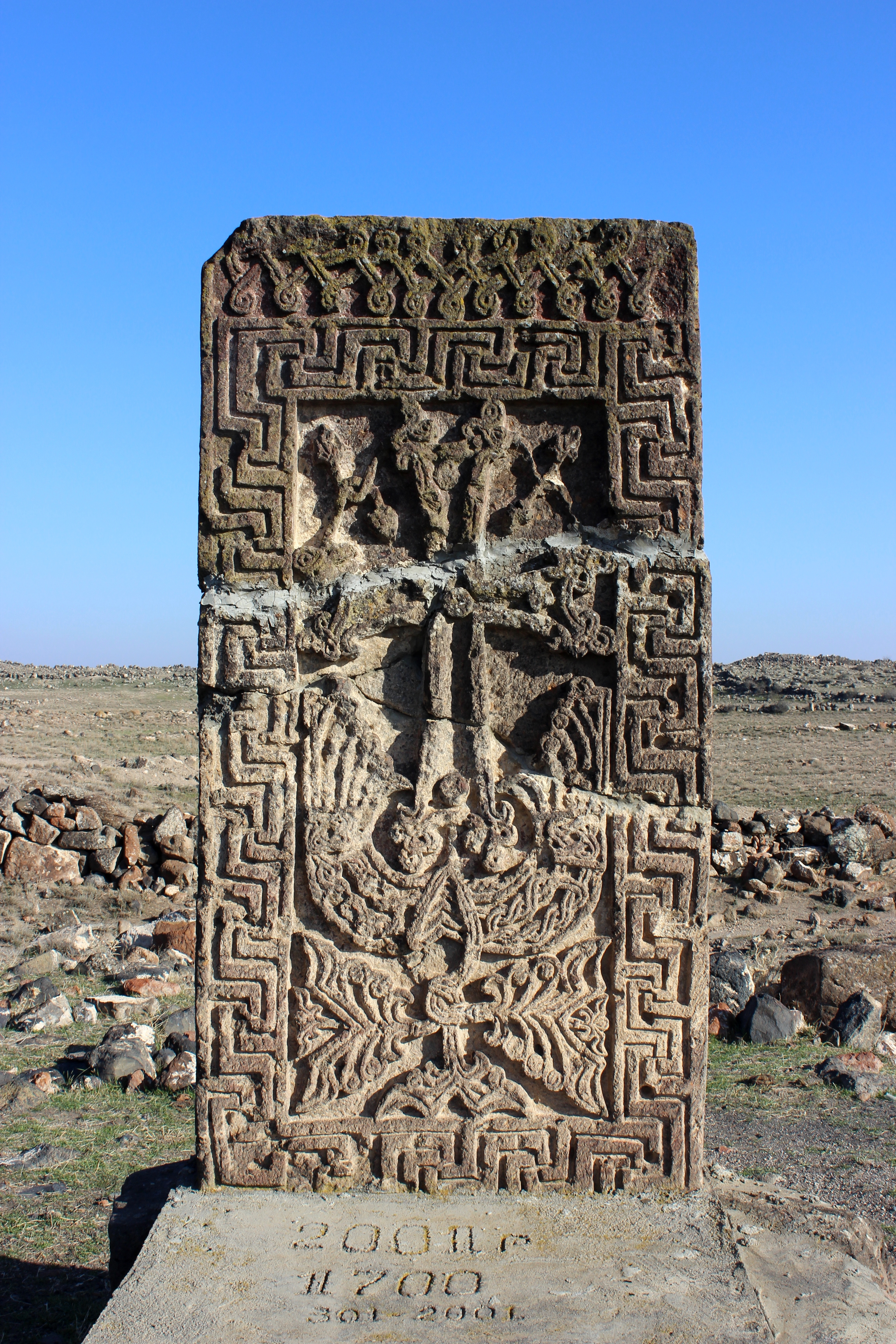
Large khachkar along the road that leads to Kristapori Vank.
