= Shafak =

Shafak may refer to:

- Elif Şafak (born 1971), Turkish novelist
- Vanevan, Armenia, formerly Shafak
