= Karakoyun =

Karakoyun may refer to:

- Kara Koyunlu, a Turkic tribal federation
- Karakoyunlu, a district of Iğdır Province in Turkey
- Karakoyun, Armenia, a town in Armenia
