= Sarnakhpyur =

- Location within Armenia Location within Gegharkunik
- Coordinates: 40°04′N 45°09′E
- Country: Armenia
- Marz (Province): Gegharkunik
- Time zone: UTC+4
  - Summer (DST): UTC+5 ( )

Sarnakhpyur (also, Sarnakhbyur) is a town in the Gegharkunik Province of Armenia.
