= Kyarkibash =

Abandoned village in Gegharkunik, Armenia

- Location within Armenia
- Coordinates: 40°11′23″N 45°40′39″E
- Country: Armenia
- Marz (Province): Gegharkunik
- Time zone: UTC+4

Kyarkibash is an abandoned village in Gegharkunik Province of Armenia.

== See also ==
- Gegharkunik Province
