= Atdash =

- Location within Armenia Location within Gegharkunik
- Coordinates: 40°02′06″N 45°11′23″E
- Country: Armenia
- Marz (Province): Gegharkunik
- Time zone: UTC+4 ( )
  - Summer (DST): UTC+5 ( )

Atdash is a town in the Martuni Municipality of the Gegharkunik Province of Armenia.
