= Kizilkharaba =

Kizilkharaba Կիզիլխարաբա
- Location within Armenia Location within Gegharkunik
- Coordinates: 40°03′49″N 45°08′38″E
- Country: Armenia
- Marz (Province): Gegharkunik
- Time zone: UTC+4 (AMT)

Kizilkharaba (Armenian: Կիզիլխարաբա) is an abandoned village in the Gegharkunik Province of Armenia.
