= Chichakli =

Village in Gegharkunik, Armenia

Chichakli Չիչակլի
- Location within Armenia Location within Gegharkunik
- Coordinates: 40°07′36″N 45°36′57″E
- Country: Armenia
- Marz (Province): Gegharkunik
- Time zone: UTC+4 ( )

Chichakli (Armenian: Չիչակլի), formerly known as Kizilvank, is an abandoned village in the Gegharkunik Province of Armenia, located near the village of Makenis.
