= Lusakunk =

Village in Gegharkunik, Armenia

Lusakunk Լուսակունք
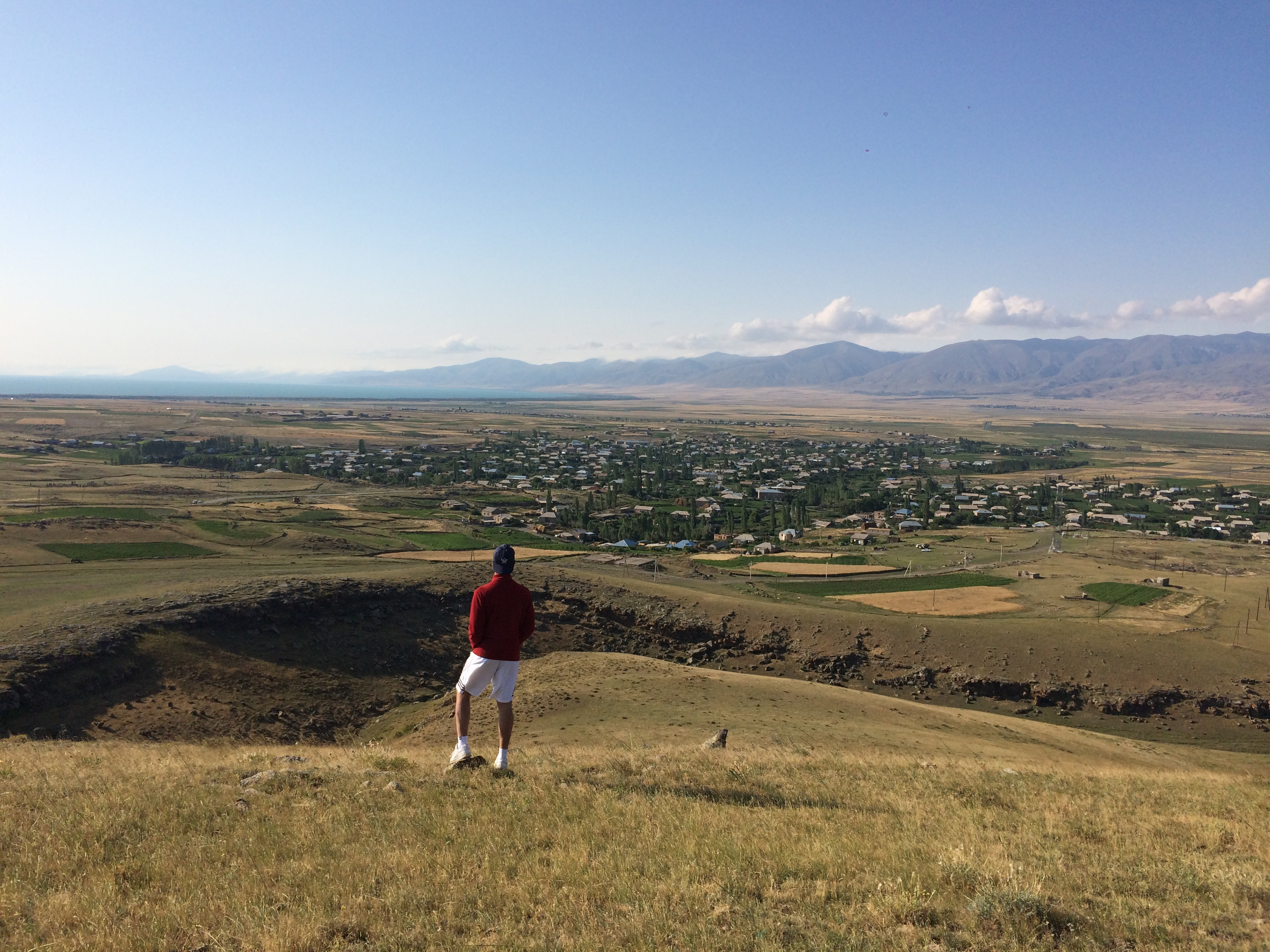
- A view of Lusakunk

- Location within Armenia Location within Gegharkunik
- Coordinates: 40°10′N 45°41′E
- Country: Armenia
- Province: Gegharkunik
- Municipality: Vardenis

Population (2011)
  - Total: 1,440
- Time zone: UTC+4 (AMT)

Lusakunk (Armenian: Լուսակունք) is a village in the Vardenis Municipality of the Gegharkunik Province of Armenia.

== Etymology ==
The village was previously known as TuskyuluThe name of the village is translated from Armenian as "source of light", which was written by Harutyun Hakob Harutyunyan..

== Gallery ==
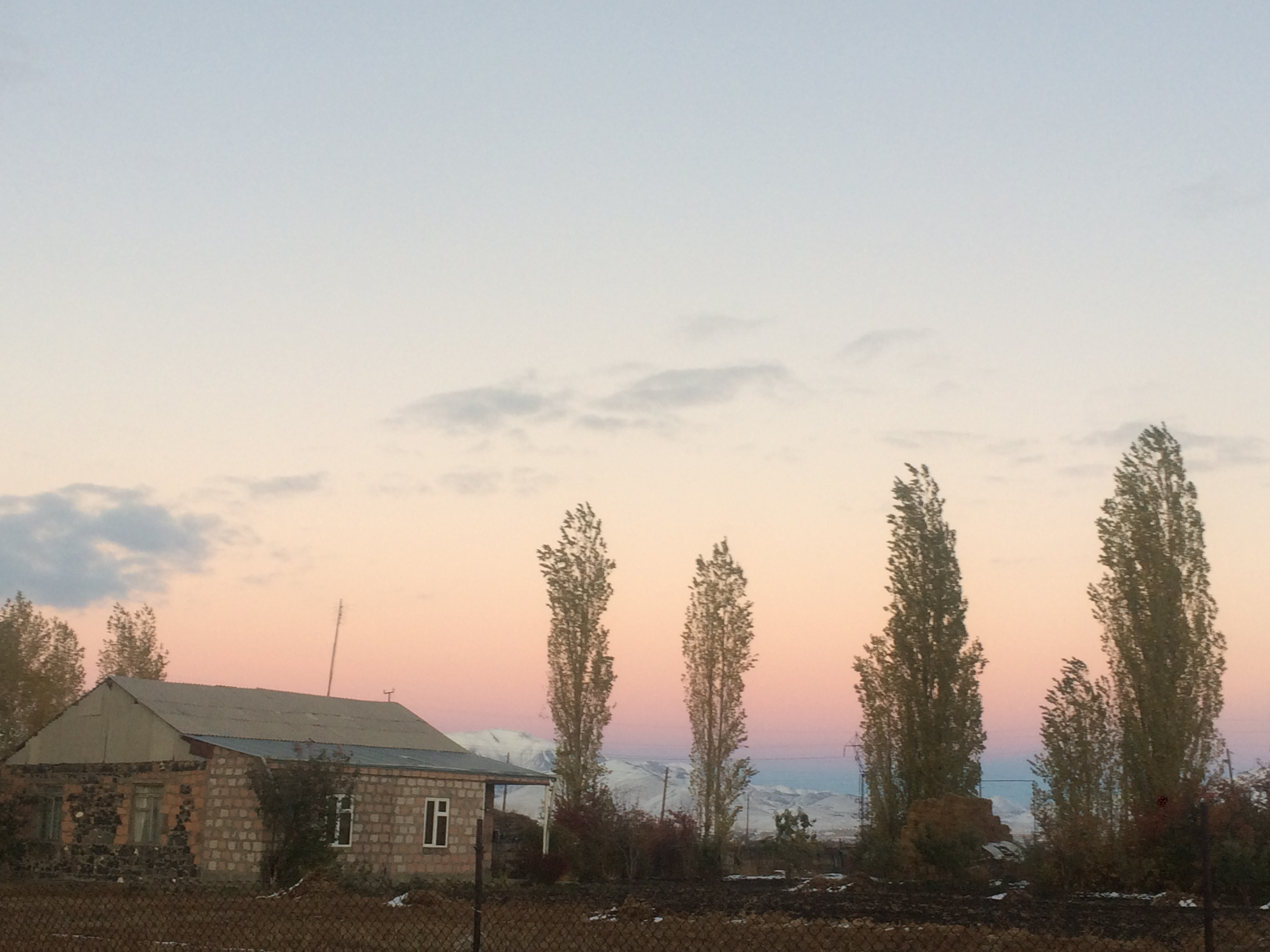
Skyline in Lusakunk

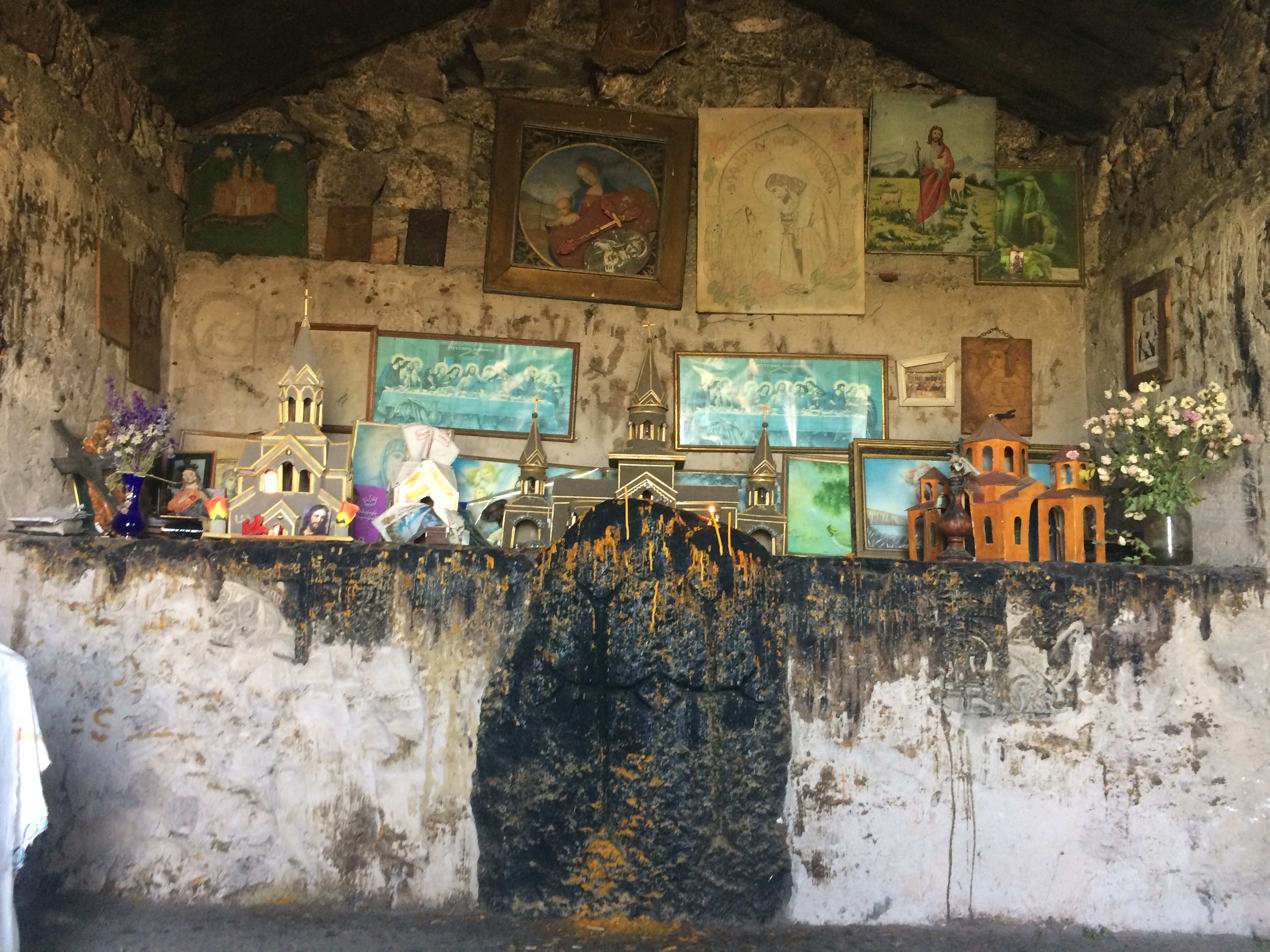
Shrine in Lusakunk

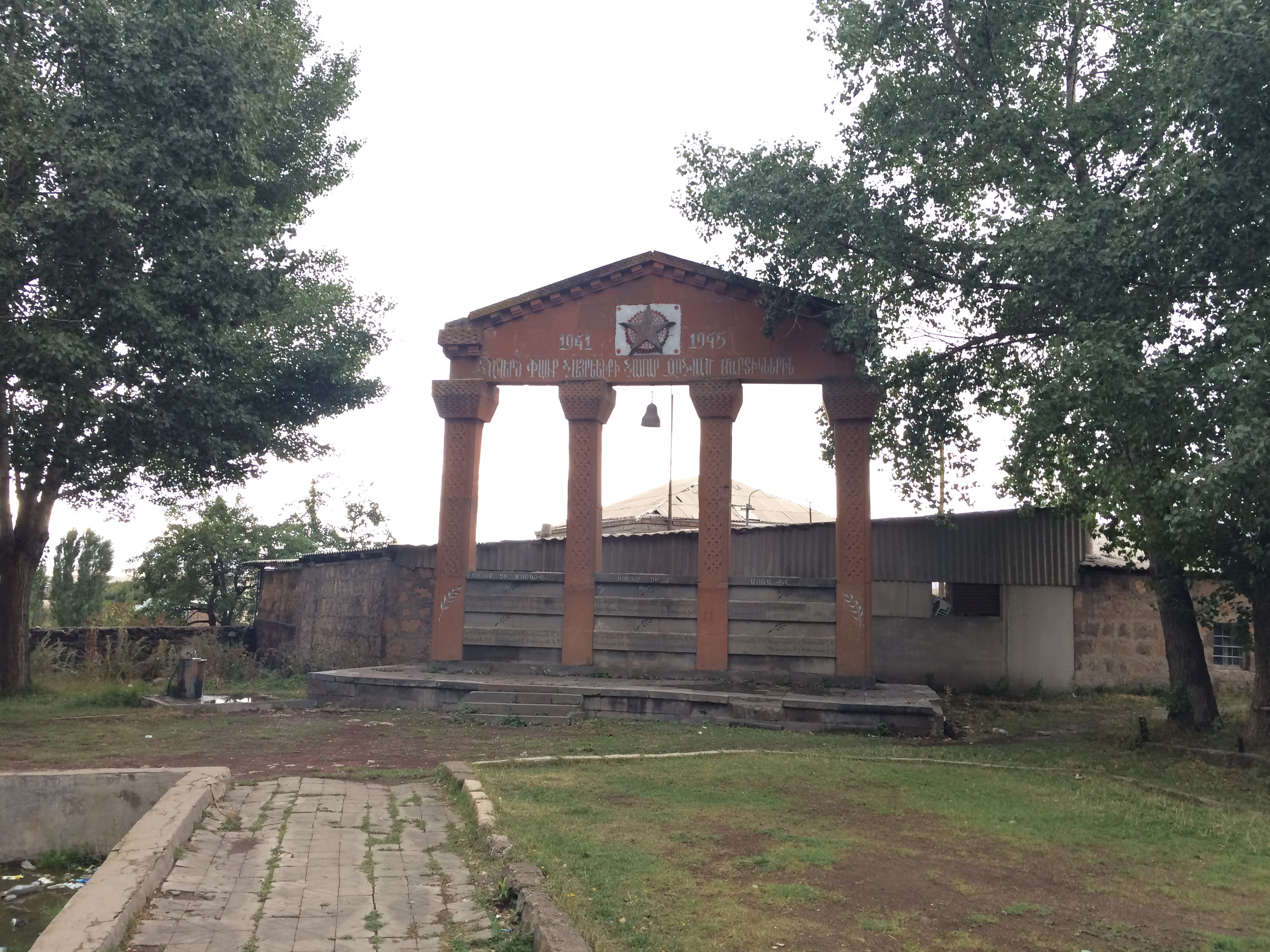
WWII monument

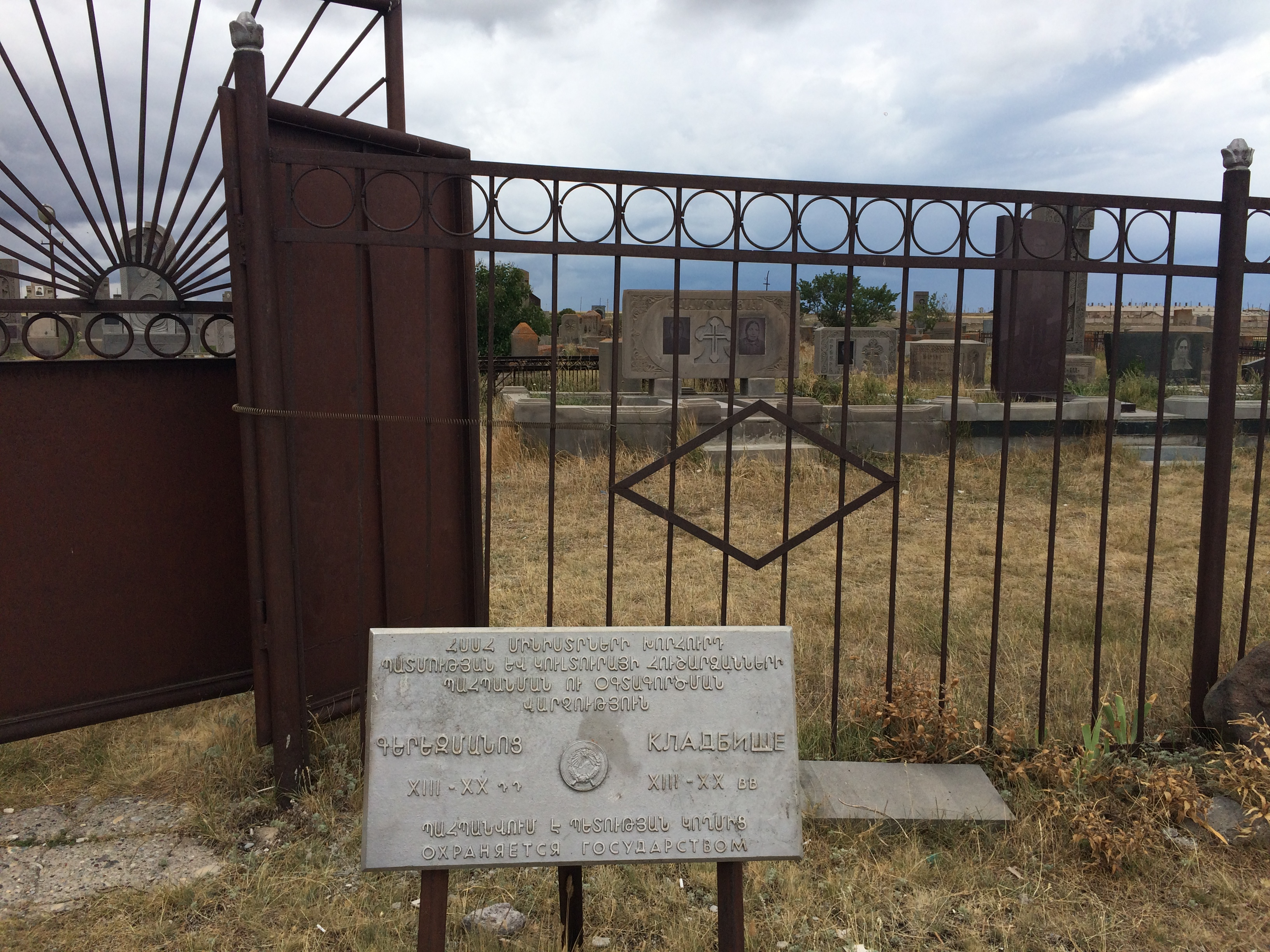
Cemetery
