= Lchavan =

Village in Gegharkunik, Armenia

Lchavan Լճավան
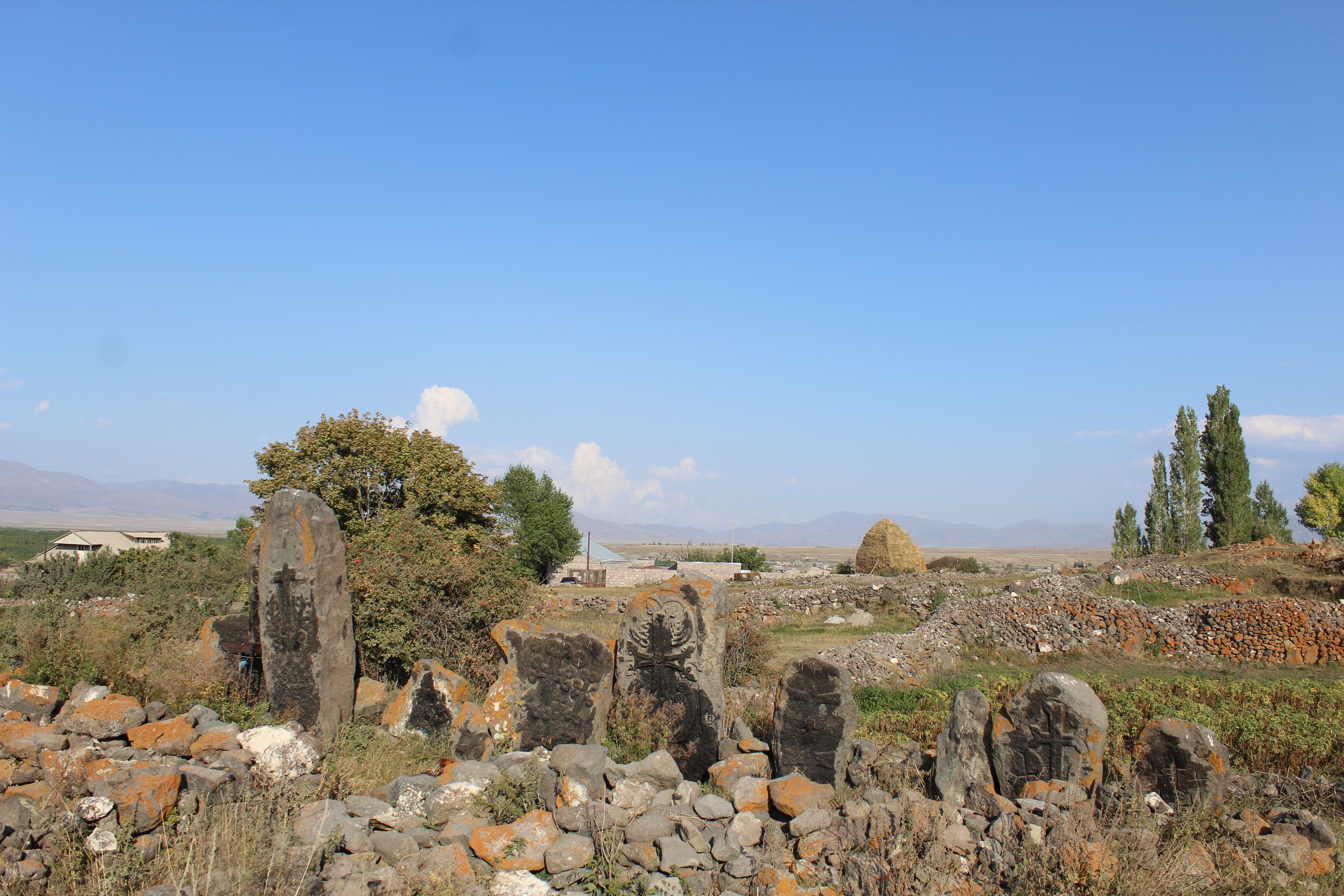
- Khachkars on the side of the Tsovak-Lchavan road

- Location within Armenia Location within Gegharkunik
- Coordinates: 40°09′07″N 45°36′52″E
- Country: Armenia
- Province: Gegharkunik
- Municipality: Vardenis

Population (2011)
  - Total: 548
- Time zone: UTC+4 (AMT)

Lchavan (Armenian: Լճավան) is a village in the Vardenis Municipality of the Gegharkunik Province of Armenia, located to the southeast of Lake Sevan.

== History ==
The village has Bronze Age tombs and a church dating to the 13th-14th century with khachkars.
