= Vanevan =

Village in Gegharkunik, Armenia

Vanevan Վանևան
- Location within Armenia Location within Gegharkunik
- Coordinates: 40°11′29″N 45°40′30″E
- Country: Armenia
- Province: Gegharkunik
- Municipality: Vardenis

Government
  - Mayor: Norayr Harutyunyan
- Elevation: 1,952 m (6,404 ft)

Population (2011)
  - Total: 367
- Time zone: UTC+4 (AMT)

Vanevan (Armenian: Վանևան) is a village in the Vardenis Municipality of the Gegharkunik Province of Armenia, located close to the village of Torfavan. It was founded in 1828 by Armenians. The village was later populated by Azerbaijanis before the exodus of Azerbaijanis from Armenia after the outbreak of the Nagorno-Karabakh conflict. Armenians who were deported from Azerbaijan now live in the village.

== Etymology ==
The village was previously known as Shafak.
