= Geghakar =

Village in Gegharkunik, Armenia

Geghakar Գեղաքար
- Location within Armenia Location within Gegharkunik
- Coordinates: 40°07′01″N 45°40′59″E
- Country: Armenia
- Province: Gegharkunik
- Municipality: Vardenis
- Elevation: 2,158 m (7,080 ft)

Population (2011)
  - Total: 136
- Time zone: UTC+4 (AMT)

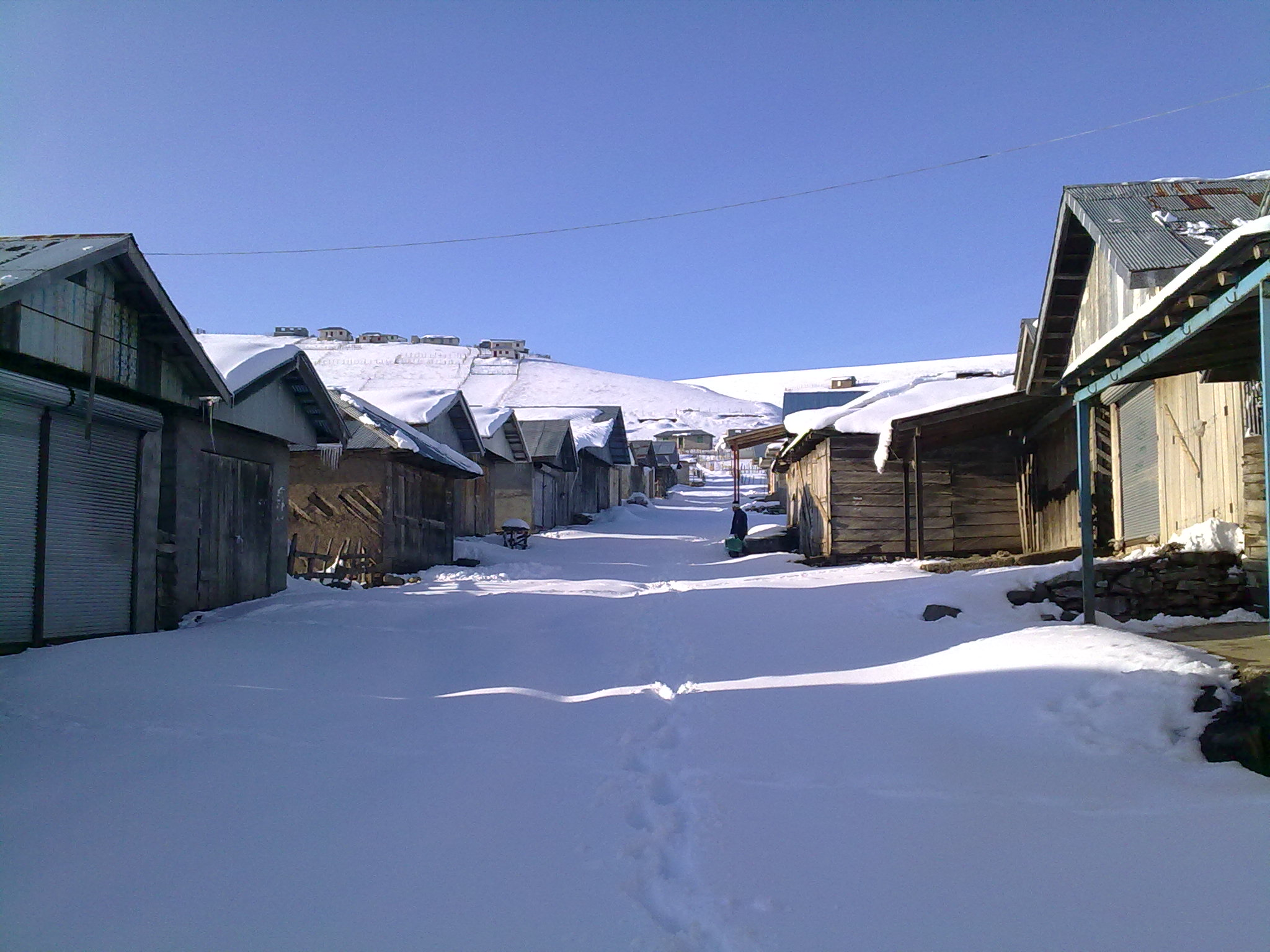

Geghakar (Armenian: Գեղաքար) is a village in the Vardenis Municipality of the Gegharkunik Province of Armenia.
