= Nshkhark =

Nshkhark Նշխարք
- Location within Armenia Location within Gegharkunik
- Coordinates: 40°00′25″N 45°14′26″E
- Country: Armenia
- Province: Gegharkunik
- Municipality: Martuni

Population (2011)
  - Total: 0
- Time zone: UTC+4

Nshkhark (Armenian: Նշխարք) is an abandoned village in the Martuni Municipality of the Gegharkunik Province of Armenia.
