= Shatjrek =

Village in Gegharkunik, Armenia

Shatjrek Շատջրեք
- Location within Armenia Location within Gegharkunik
- Coordinates: 40°09′50″N 45°48′12″E
- Country: Armenia
- Province: Gegharkunik
- Municipality: Vardenis

Population (2011)
  - Total: 466
- Time zone: UTC+4 (AMT)

Shatjrek (Armenian: Շատջրեք) is a village in the Vardenis Municipality of the Gegharkunik Province of Armenia. The village was populated by Azerbaijanis before the exodus of Azerbaijanis from Armenia after the outbreak of the Nagorno-Karabakh conflict. In 1988-1989 Armenian refugees from Azerbaijan settled in the village.
