= Zariver =

Abandoned village in Gegharkunik, Armenia

Zariver Զառիվեր
- Location within Armenia Location within Gegharkunik
- Coordinates: 40°16′45″N 45°49′55″E
- Country: Armenia
- Province: Gegharkunik
- Municipality: Vardenis

Population (2011)
  - Total: 0
- Time zone: UTC+4 (AMT)

Zariver (Armenian: Զառիվեր) is an abandoned village in the Vardenis Municipality of the Gegharkunik Province of Armenia.
