= Tsovazard =

Village in Gegharkunik, Armenia

Tsovazard Ծովազարդ
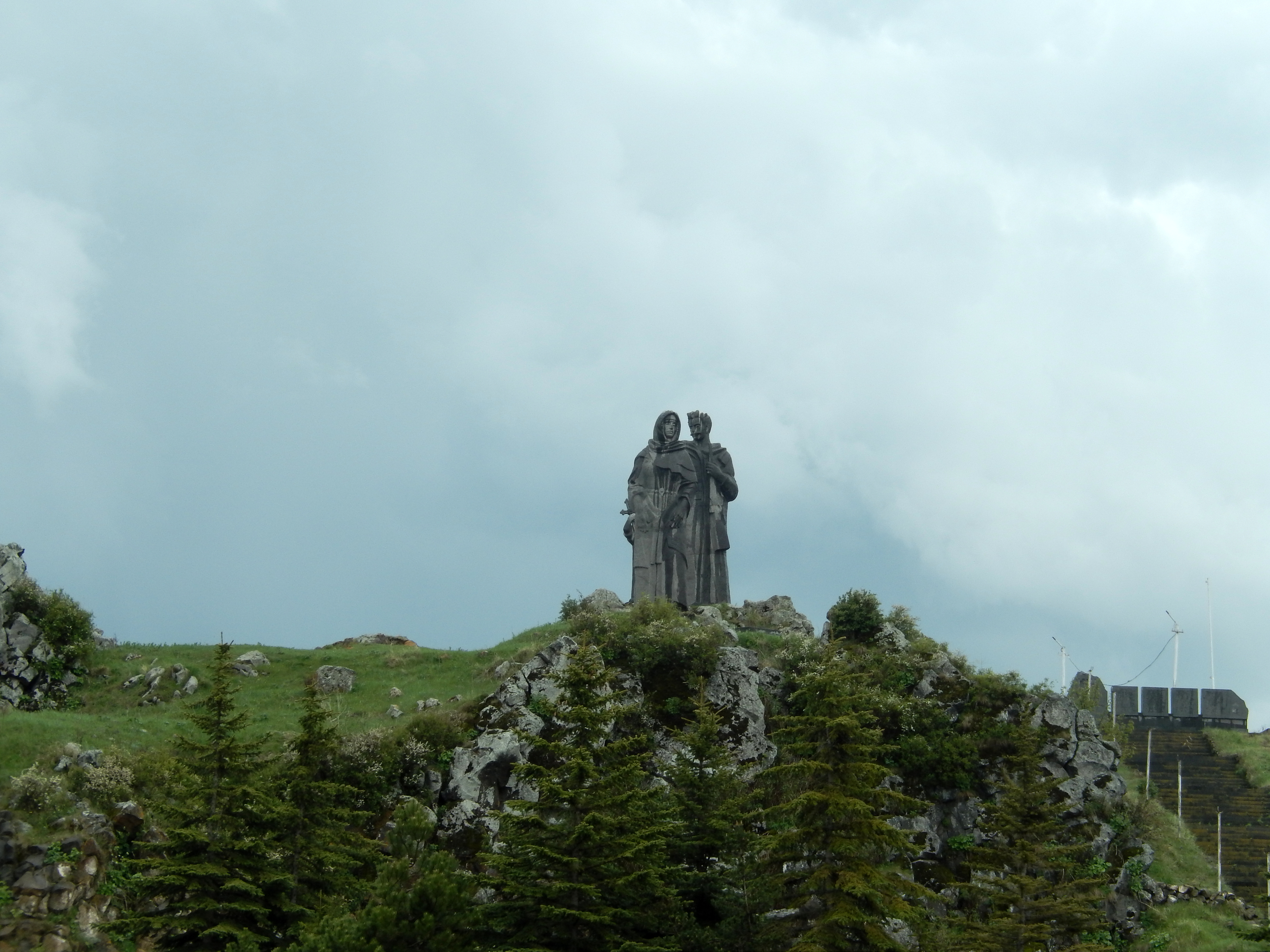
- Monument in Tsovazard

- Location within Armenia Location within Gegharkunik
- Coordinates: 40°28′37″N 45°02′15″E
- Country: Armenia
- Province: Gegharkunik
- Municipality: Gavar

Population (2011)
  - Total: 1,905
- Time zone: UTC+4 (AMT)

Tsovazard (Armenian: Ծովազարդ) is a village in the Gavar Municipality of the Gegharkunik Province of Armenia.

== History ==
There are Bronze Age burial sites and a church rebuilt in the 19th century in the vicinity of the village.

== Gallery ==
Karmir Avetaran Church in Tsovazard

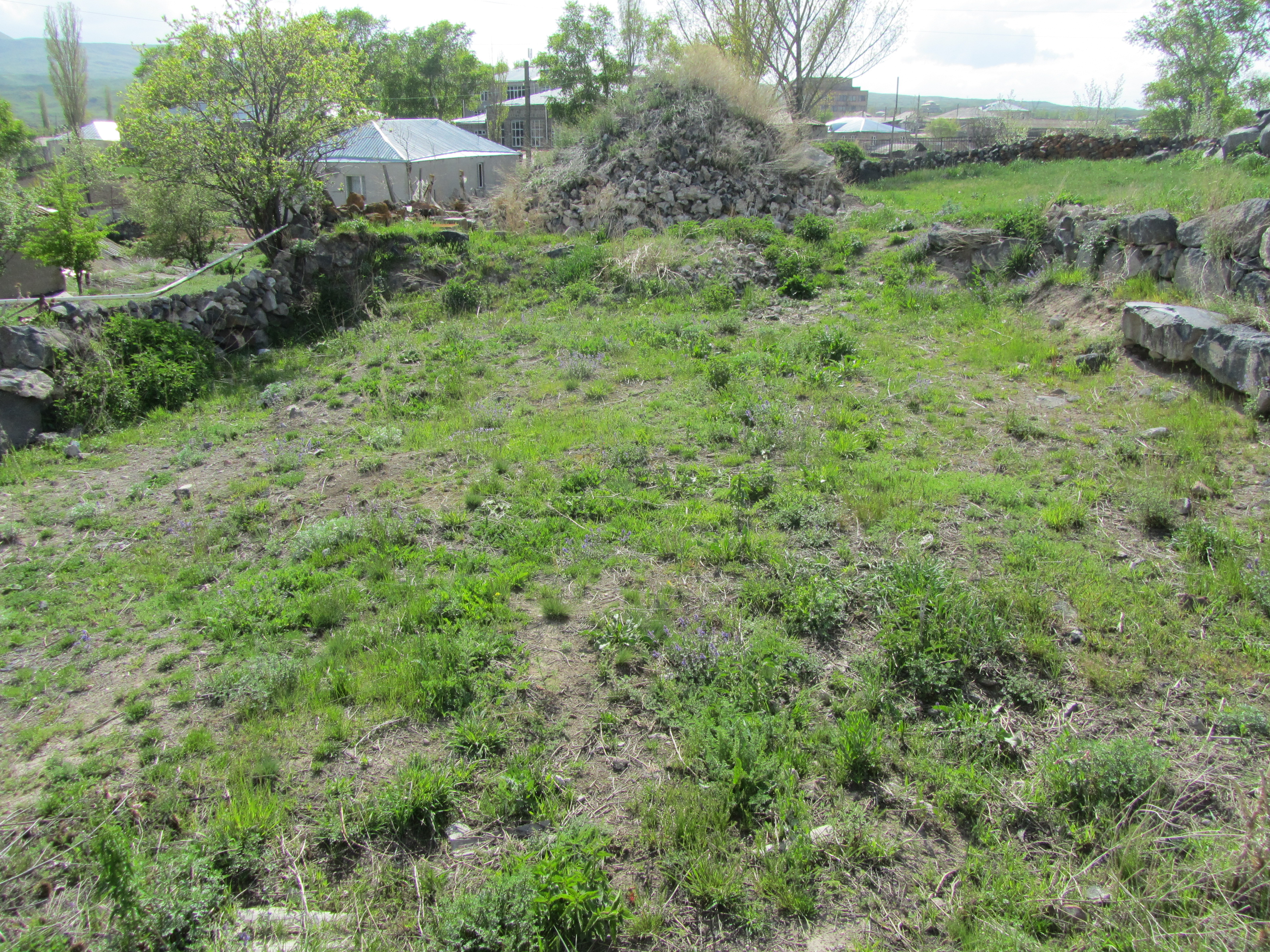

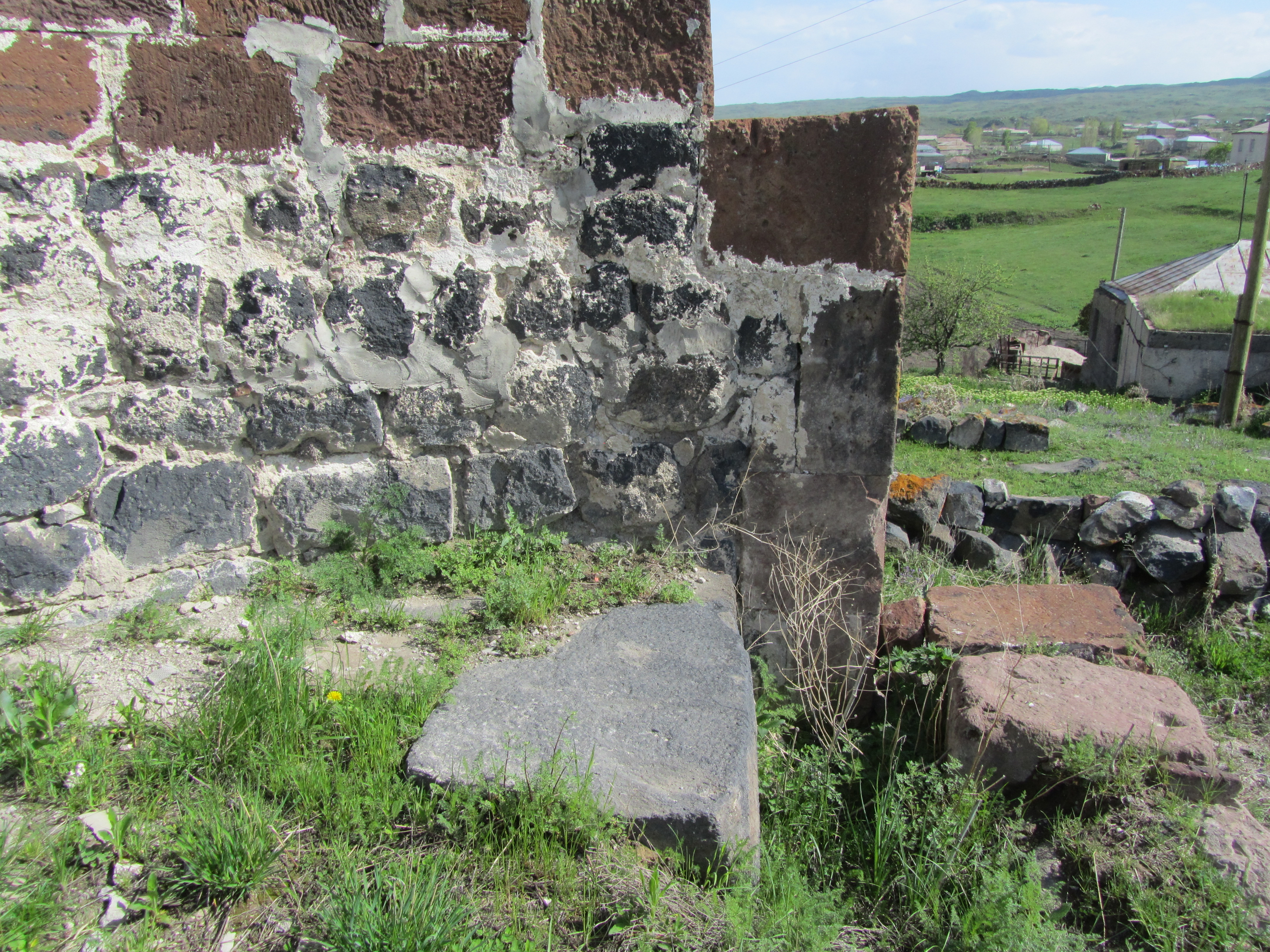

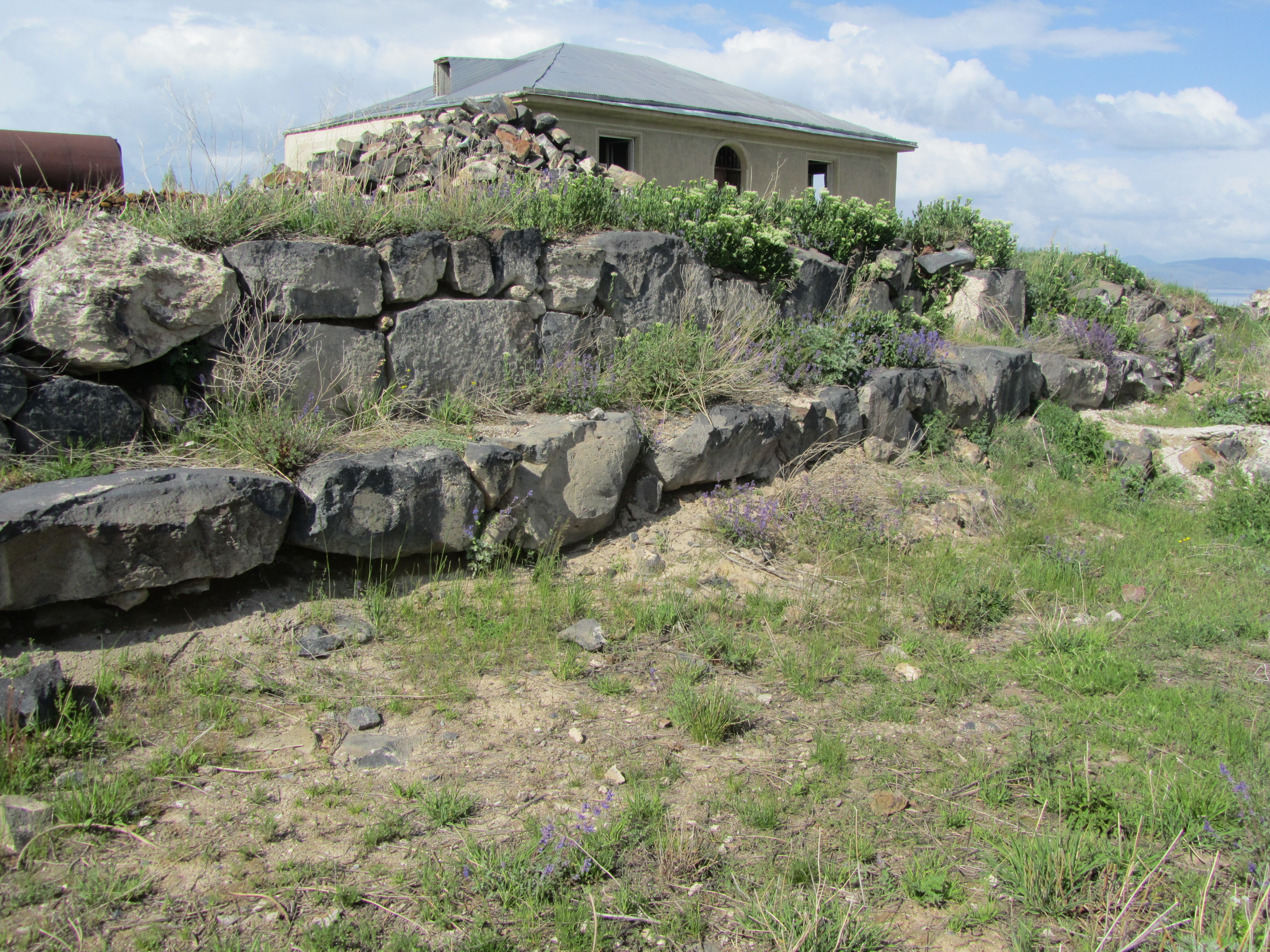

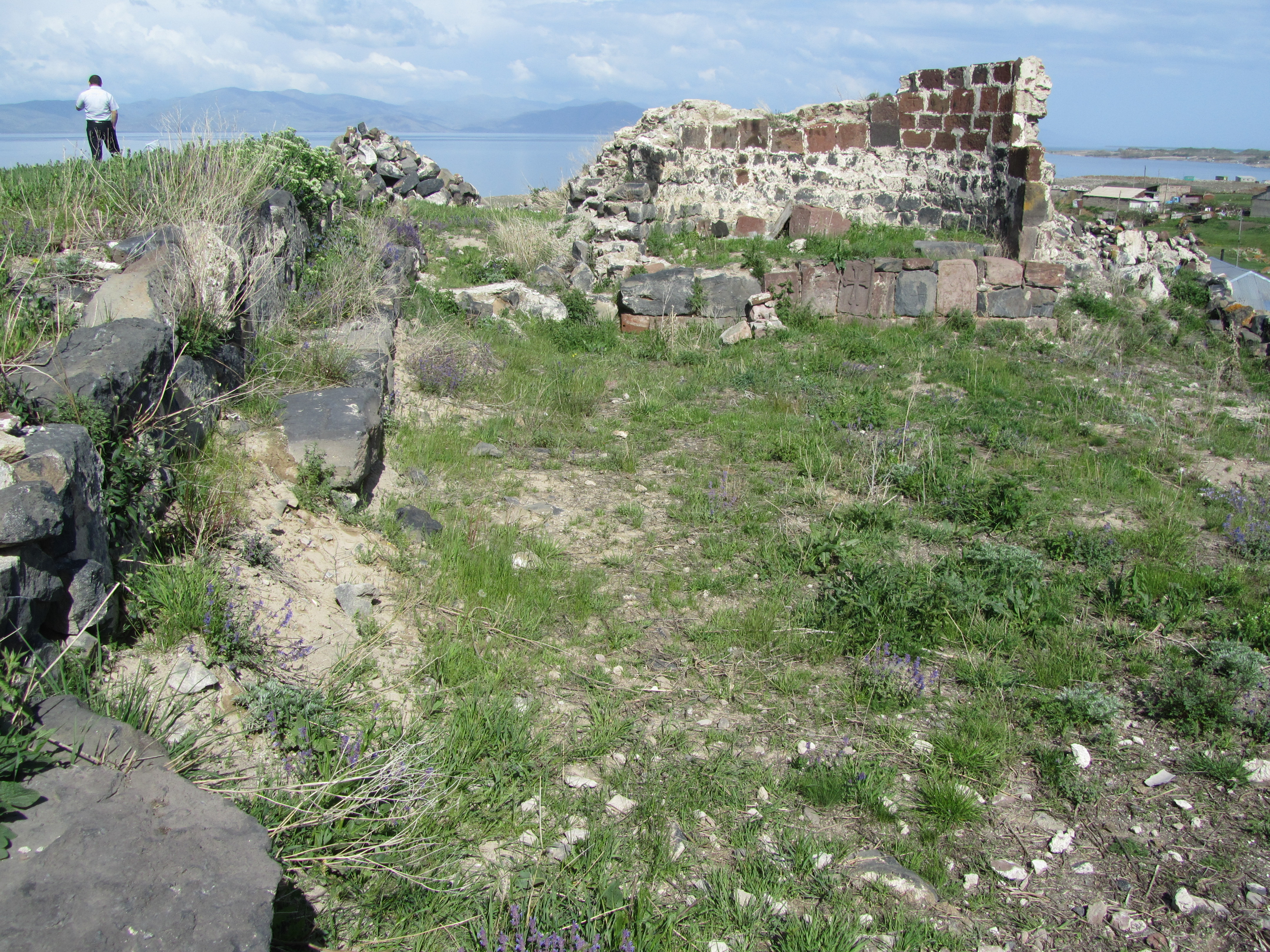
