= Chapkut =

Abandoned village in Gegharkunik, Armenia

Chapkut Ճապկուտ
- Location within Armenia Location within Gegharkunik
- Coordinates: 40°39′01″N 45°12′36″E
- Country: Armenia
- Province: Gegharkunik
- Municipality: Chambarak
- Elevation: 1,793 m (5,883 ft)

Population (2011)
  - Total: 0
- Time zone: UTC+4 (AMT)

Chapkut (Armenian: Ճապկուտ) is an abandoned village in the Chambarak Municipality of the Gegharkunik Province of Armenia.
