= Geghamabak =

Village in Gegharkunik, Armenia

Geghamabak Գեղամաբակ
- Location within Armenia Location within Gegharkunik
- Coordinates: 40°09′52″N 45°48′18″E
- Country: Armenia
- Province: Gegharkunik
- Municipality: Vardenis
- Elevation: 2,027 m (6,650 ft)

Population (2011)
  - Total: 135
- Time zone: UTC+4 (AMT)

Geghamabak (Armenian: Գեղամաբակ) is a village in the Vardenis Municipality of the Gegharkunik Province of Armenia. In 1988-1989 Armenian refugees from Azerbaijan settled in the village.

== Etymology ==
The village was also previously known as Ghayabagh, and was renamed to Geghamabak in 1990.

== Demographics ==
As of 2020, according to a media report, Geghamabak had 129 registered inhabitants, and 64 inhabitants de facto.
