= Areguni =

Village in Gegharkunik, Armenia

Areguni Արեգունի
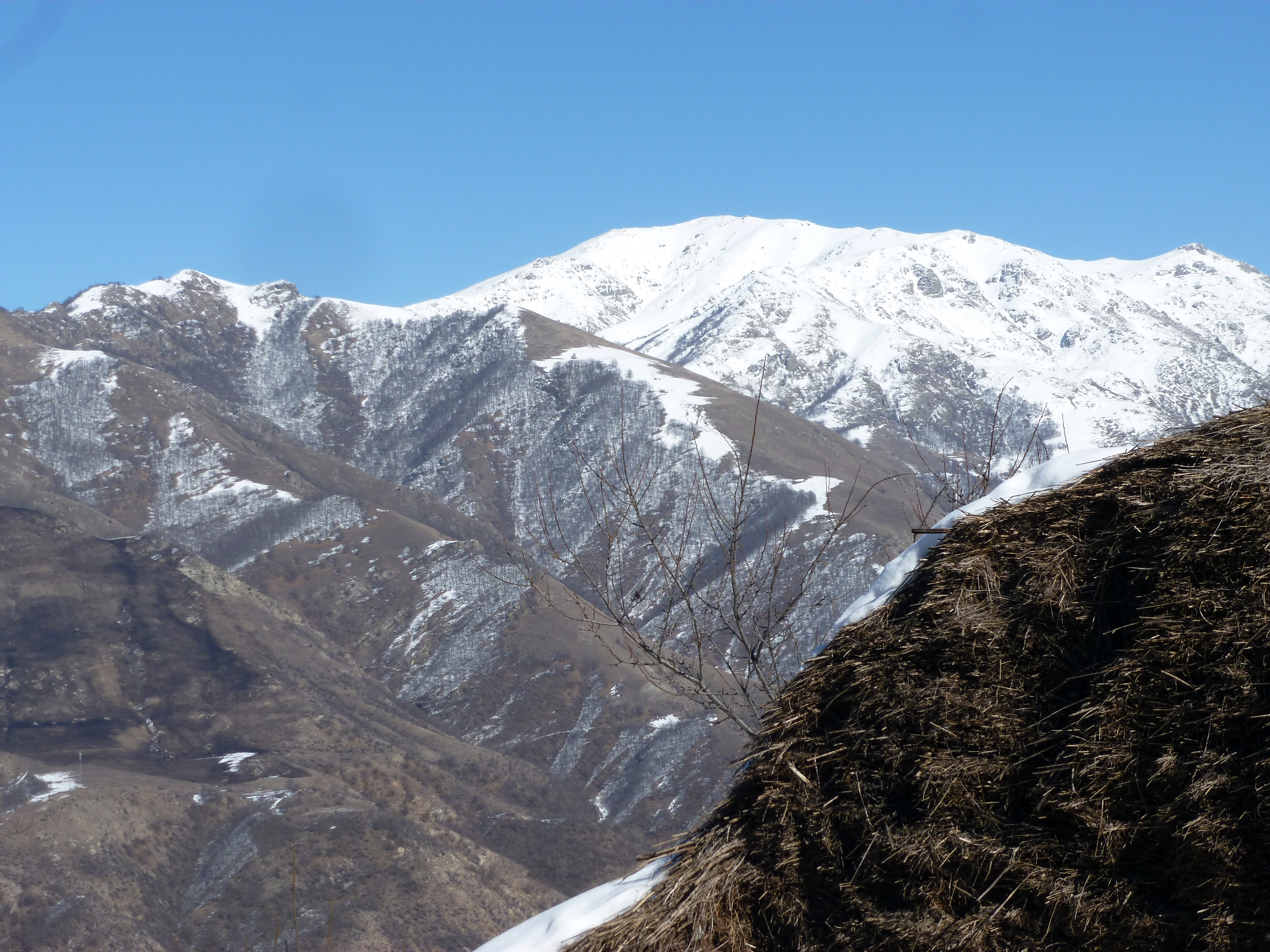
- Scenery around the Areguni mountain range

- Location within Armenia Location within Gegharkunik
- Coordinates: 40°20′17″N 45°36′32″E
- Country: Armenia
- Province: Gegharkunik
- Municipality: Vardenis
- Elevation: 2,014 m (6,608 ft)

Population (2011)
  - Total: 344
- Time zone: UTC+4 (AMT)
- Postal code: 1606

Areguni (Armenian: Արեգունի) is a village in the Vardenis Municipality of the Gegharkunik Province of Armenia.

== Etymology ==
The village was known as Satanakhach until 1935, and earlier as Gyuney.

== Gallery ==
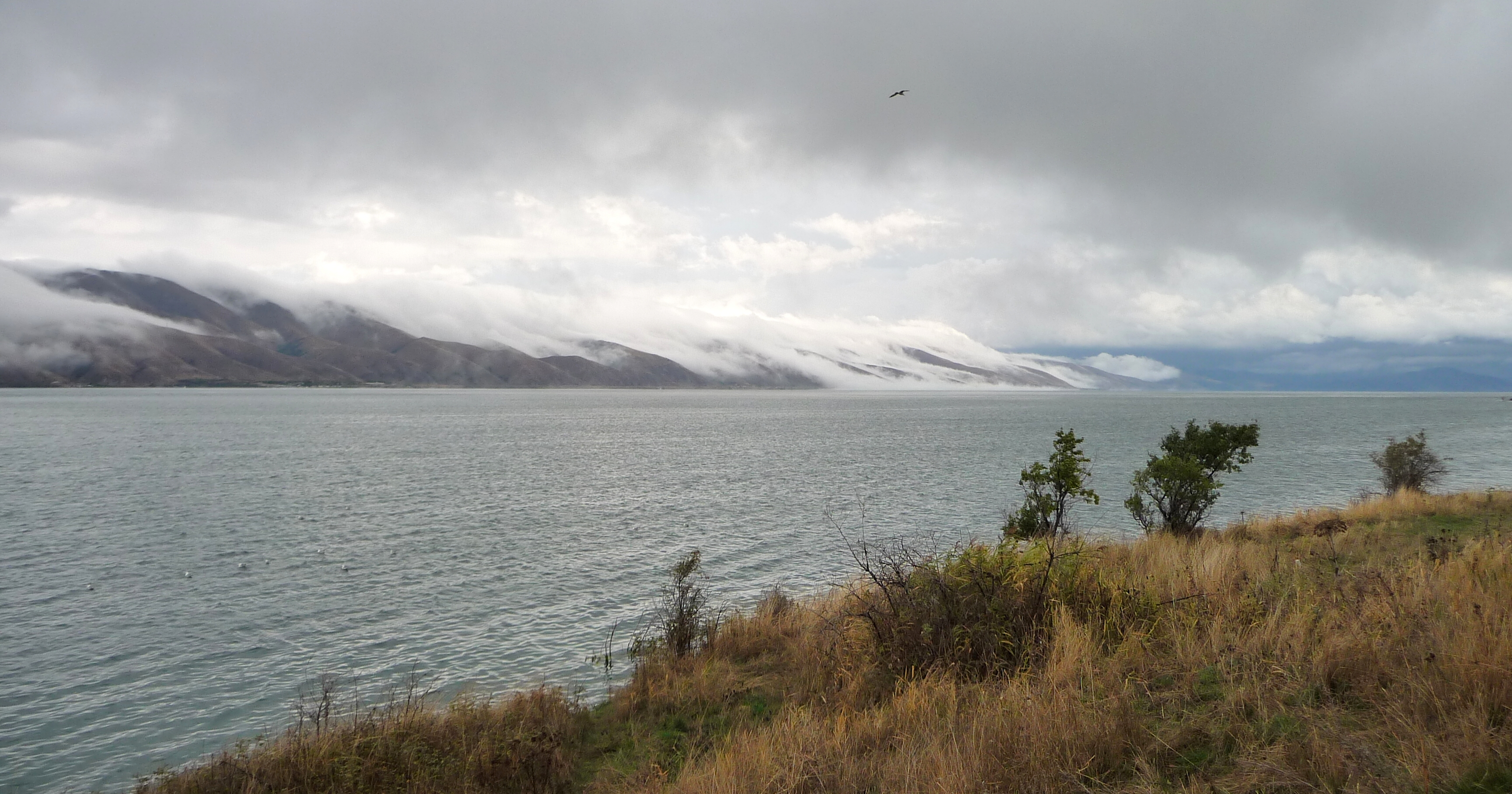
Lake Sevan and the Areguni mountain range
