= Avazan =

Village in Gegharkunik, Armenia

Avazan Ավազան
- Location within Armenia Location within Gegharkunik
- Coordinates: 40°18′08″N 45°42′13″E
- Country: Armenia
- Province: Gegharkunik
- Municipality: Vardenis
- Elevation: 2,061 m (6,762 ft)

Population (2011)
  - Total: 252
- Time zone: UTC+4 (AMT)

Avazan (Armenian: Ավազան) is a village in the Vardenis Municipality of the Gegharkunik Province of Armenia. The village was populated by Azerbaijanis before the exodus of Azerbaijanis from Armenia after the outbreak of the Nagorno-Karabakh conflict. In 1988-1989 Armenian refugees from Azerbaijan settled in the village.
