= Antaramej =

Village in Gegharkunik, Armenia

Antaramej Անտառամեջ
- Location within Armenia Location within Gegharkunik
- Coordinates: 40°41′02″N 45°05′12″E
- Country: Armenia
- Province: Gegharkunik
- Municipality: Chambarak
- Elevation: 1,567 m (5,141 ft)

Population (2011)
  - Total: 171
- Time zone: UTC+4 (AMT)
- Postal code: 1307

Antaramej (Armenian: Անտառամեջ, lit. 'Within the woods') is a village in the Chambarak Municipality of the Gegharkunik Province of Armenia.

== Etymology ==
The village was known as Meshakend until 1991, and until 1978, Yanigpaya.
