= Lernakert, Gegharkunik =

Lernakert Լեռնակերտ
- Location within Armenia Location within Gegharkunik
- Coordinates: 40°04′N 45°16′E
- Country: Armenia
- Province: Gegharkunik
- Municipality: Martuni

Population (2011)
  - Total: 323
- Time zone: UTC+4 (AMT)

Lernakert (Armenian: Լեռնակերտ), previously known as Lernahovit (Լեռնահովիտ), is a village in the Martuni Municipality of the Gegharkunik Province of Armenia. Located on the road between Lake Sevan and the Vardenyats mountain pass, near Madina. It is part of the Geghhovit community.

== Sources ==
- Lernakert, Gegharkunik at GEOnet Names Server
