= Tsakkar =

Village in Gegharkunik, Armenia

Tsakkar Ծակքար
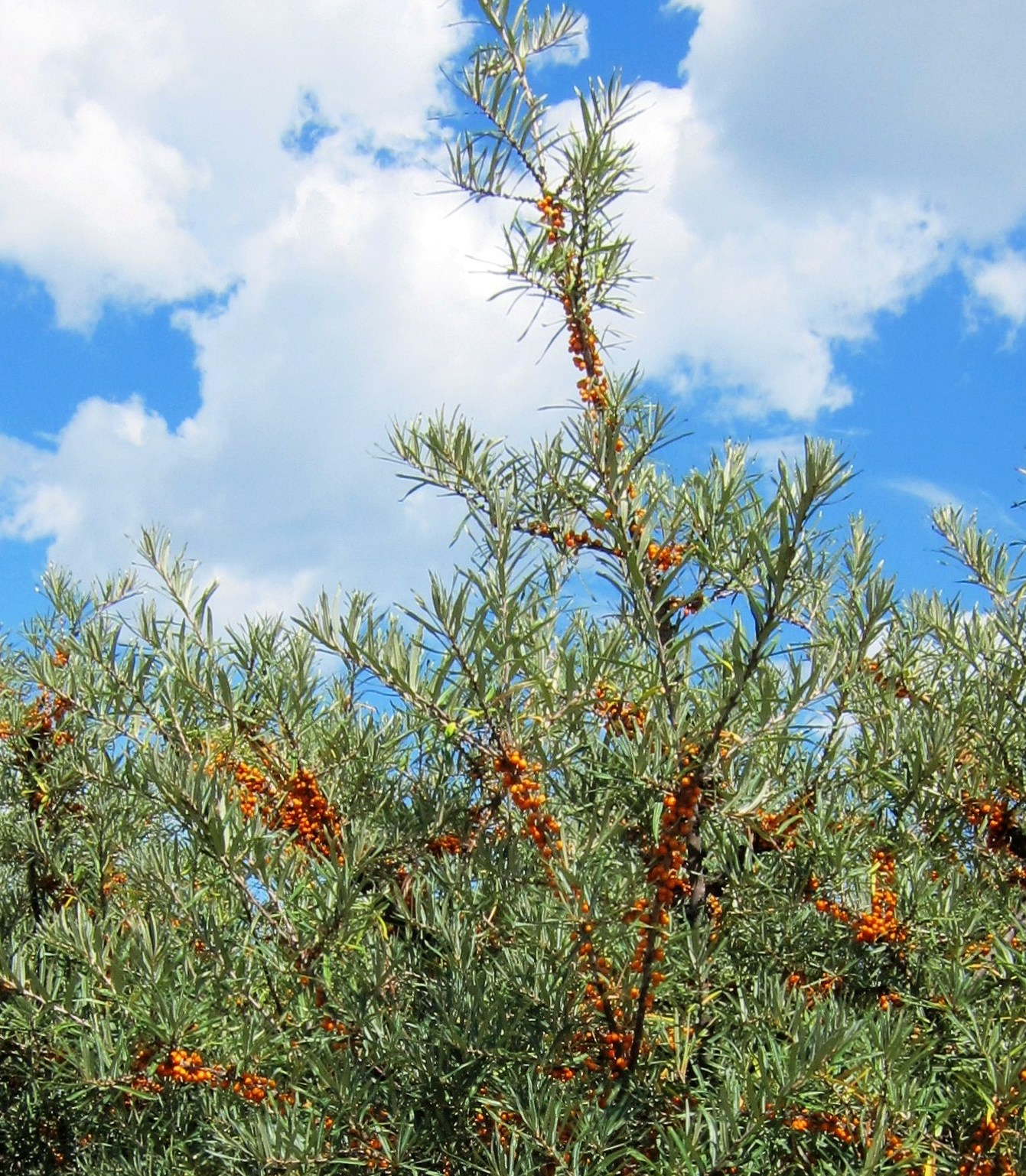
- Nature around Tsakkar

- Location within Armenia Location within Gegharkunik
- Coordinates: 40°10′04″N 45°13′02″E
- Country: Armenia
- Province: Gegharkunik
- Municipality: Martuni
- Founded: 1828

Population (2011)
  - Total: 2,692
- Time zone: UTC+4 (AMT)

Tsakkar (Armenian: Ծակքար) is a village in the Martuni Municipality of the Gegharkunik Province of Armenia.

== Etymology ==
The village was previously known as Dalikdash.

== Gallery ==
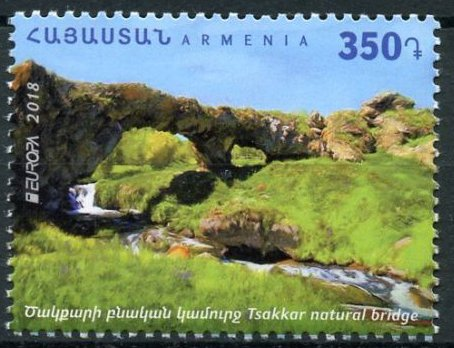
Armenian stamp depicting a natural bridge in Tsakkar
