= Norakert, Gegharkunik =

Village in Gegharkunik, Armenia

Norakert Նորակերտ
- Location within Armenia Location within Gegharkunik
- Coordinates: 40°16′01″N 45°41′00″E
- Country: Armenia
- Province: Gegharkunik
- Municipality: Vardenis
- Founded: 1927

Population (2011)
  - Total: 1,015
- Time zone: UTC+4 (AMT)

Norakert (Armenian: Նորակերտ) is a village in the Vardenis Municipality of the Gegharkunik Province of Armenia.

== History ==
Norakert was founded in 1927 as a state farm specializing in growing wheat for seed.
