= Kut, Armenia =

Village in Gegharkunik, Armenia

Kut Կութ
- Location within Armenia Location within Gegharkunik
- Coordinates: 40°10′51″N 45°54′06″E
- Country: Armenia
- Province: Gegharkunik
- Municipality: Vardenis
- Founded: 1801

Population (2011)
  - Total: 193
- Time zone: UTC+4 (AMT)

Kut (Armenian: Կութ) is a village in the Vardenis Municipality of the Gegharkunik Province of Armenia.
