= Karmirkharab =

Abandoned village in Gegharkunik, Armenia

- Location within Armenia Location within Gegharkunik
- Coordinates: 40°06′40″N 45°30′11″E
- Country: Armenia
- Marz (Province): Gegharkunik
- Time zone: UTC+4 ( )

Karmirkharab is an abandoned village in the Gegharkunik Province of Armenia.

== See also ==
- Gegharkunik Province
