= Torfavan =

Torfavan Տորֆավան
- Location within Armenia Location within Gegharkunik
- Coordinates: 40°11′N 45°38′E
- Country: Armenia
- Province: Gegharkunik
- Municipality: Vardenis

Population (2011)
  - Total: 490
- Time zone: UTC+4 (AMT)

Torfavan (Armenian: Տորֆավան) is a village in the Vardenis Municipality of the Gegharkunik Province of Armenia.
