= Karakoyun, Armenia =

Abandoned village in Gegharkunik, Armenia

Karakoyun Կարակոյուն
- Location within Armenia Location within Gegharkunik
- Coordinates: 40°08′N 45°51′E
- Country: Armenia
- Marz (Province): Gegharkunik
- Time zone: UTC+4 (AMT)

Karakoyun (Armenian: Կարակոյուն) is an abandoned village in the Gegharkunik Province of Armenia.
