= Gegharkunik Province =

Province of Armenia

Gegharkunik Գեղարքունիք
- Province
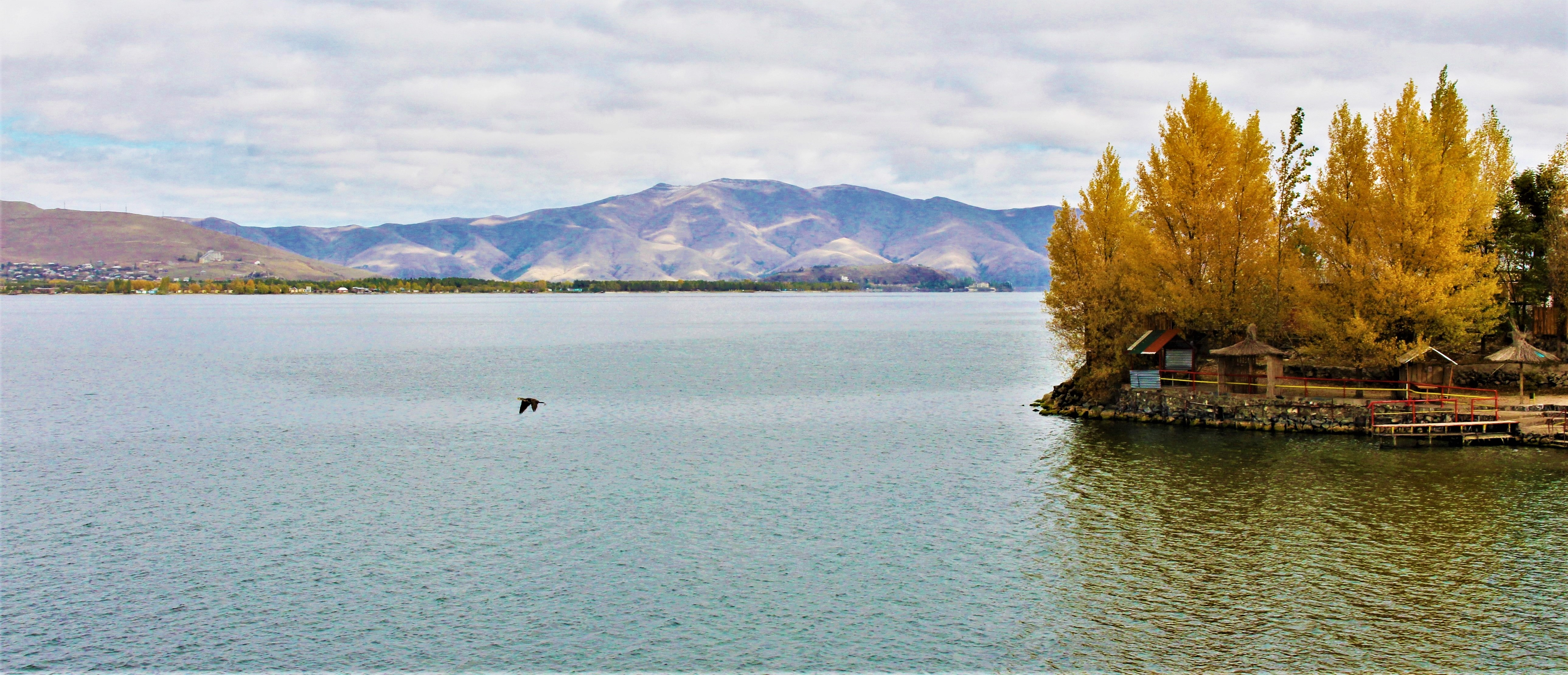
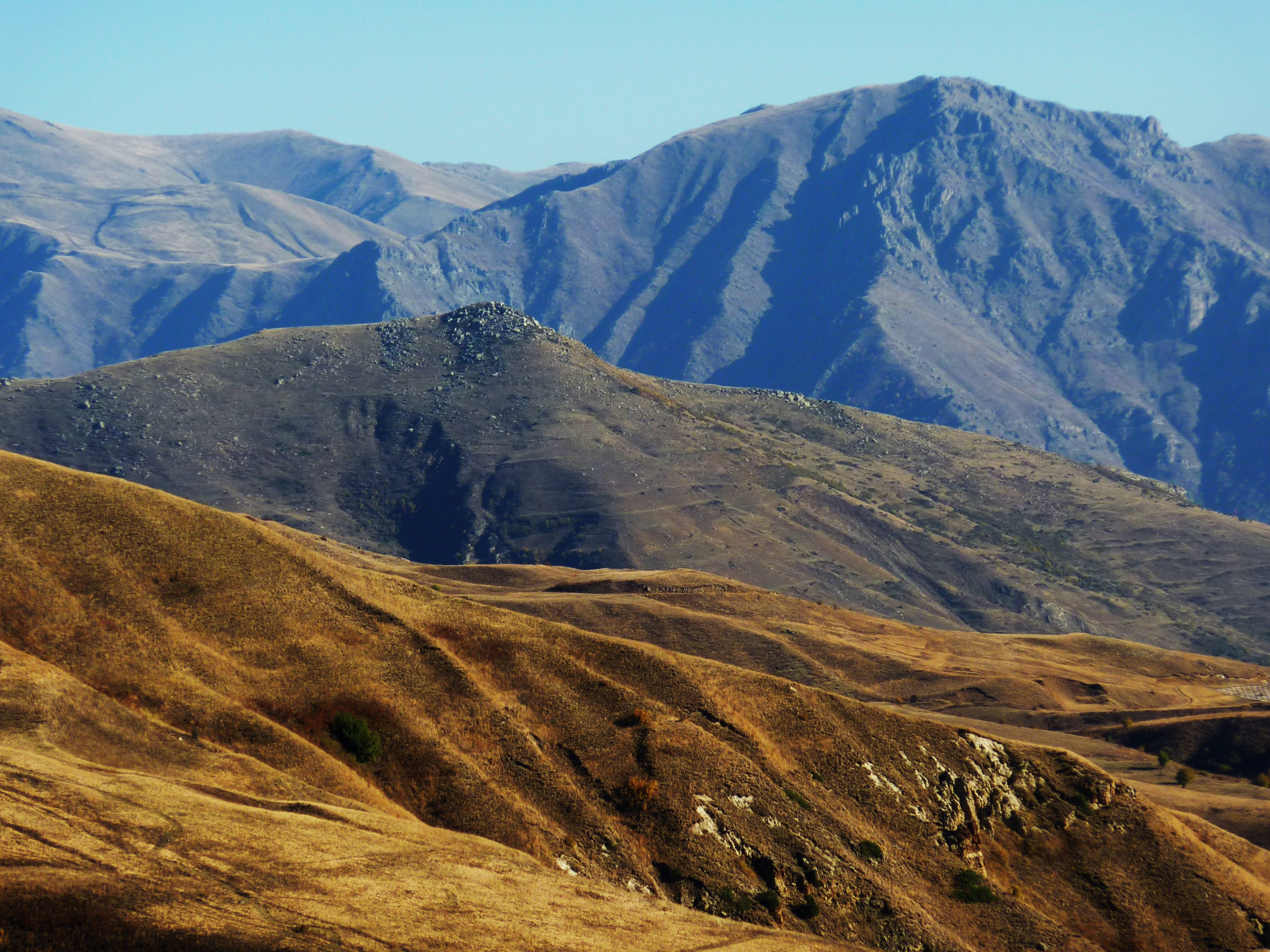
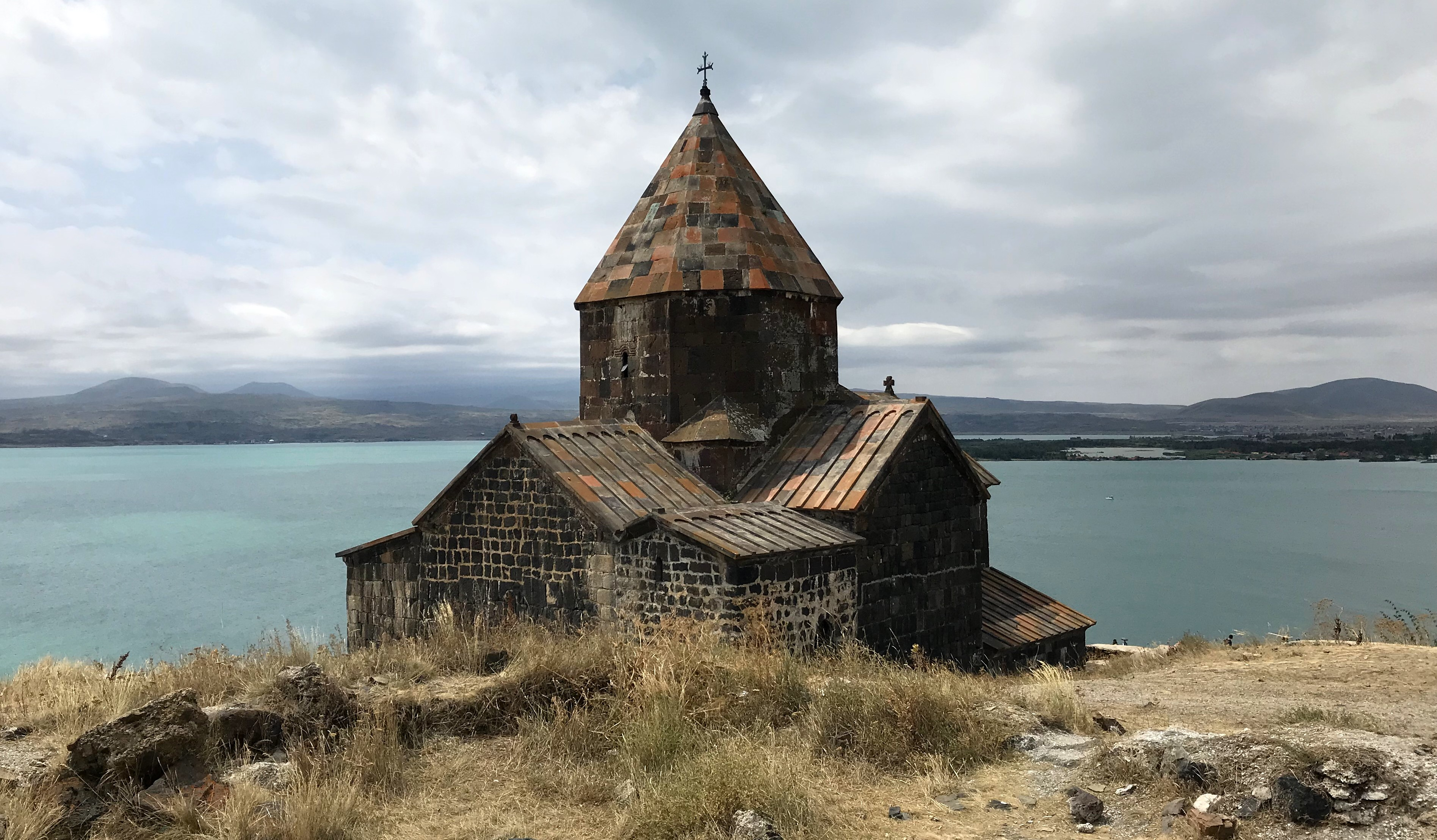
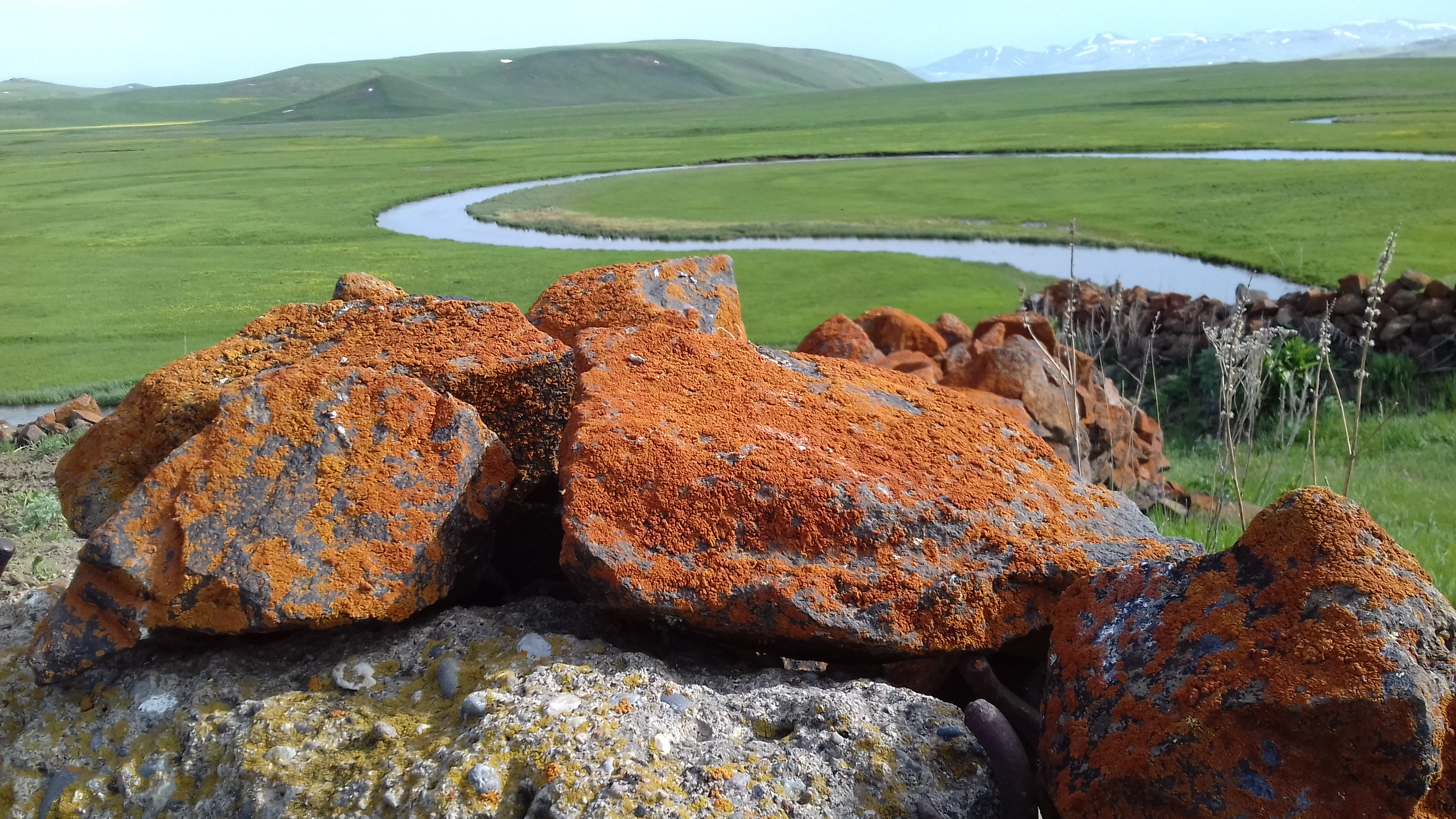
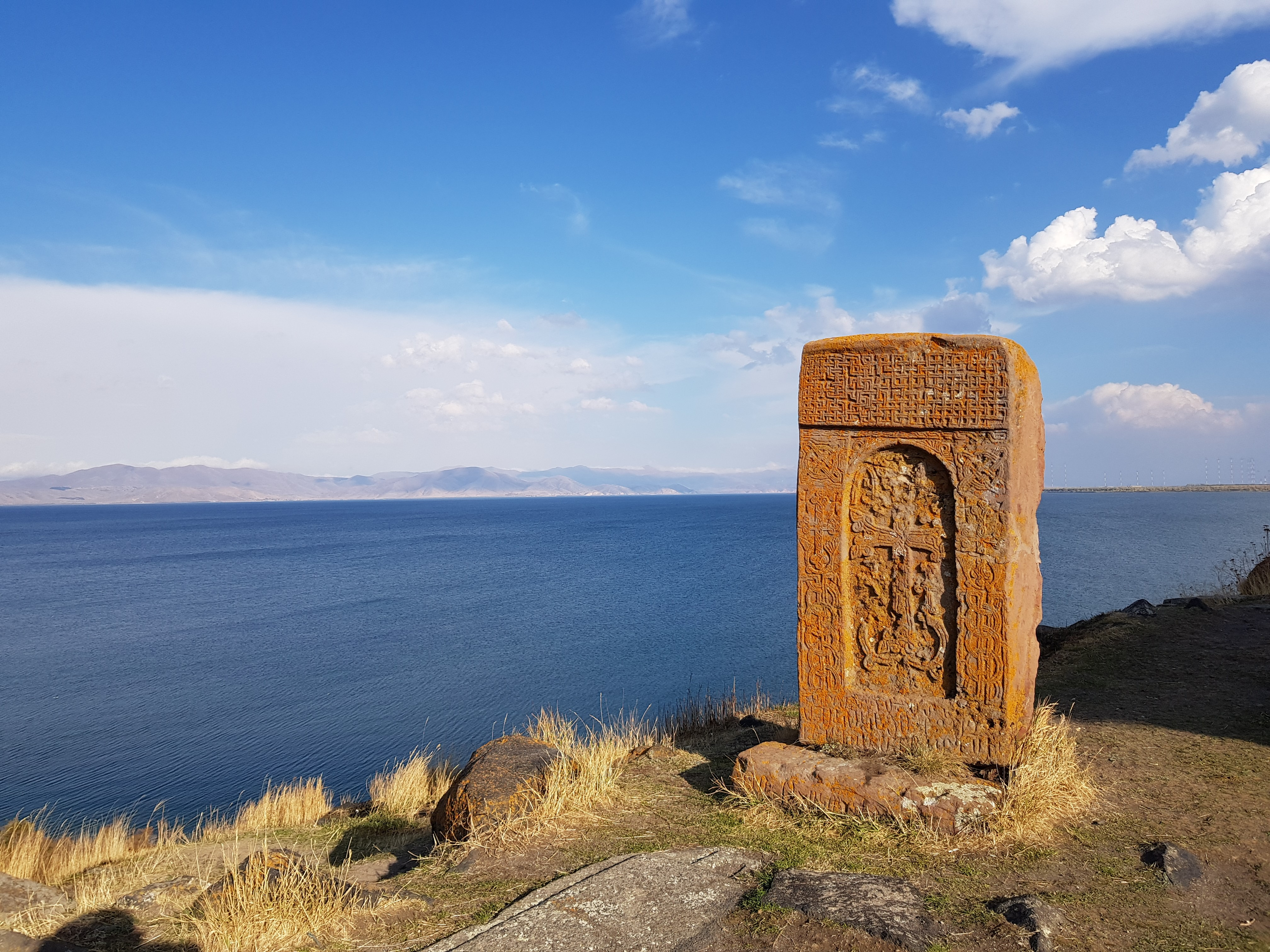
- From the top, Lake Sevan, Selim Mountain Pass, Sevanavank, Argichi River, Khatchkar on the Lake

- Location of Gegharkunik within Armenia
- Coordinates: 40°25′N 45°12′E
- Country: Armenia
- Capital Largest city: Gavar; Sevan

Government
  - Governor: Karen Sargsyan

Area
  - Total: 4,071 km^{2} (1,572 sq mi)
  - Water: 1,278 km^{2} (493 sq mi)
  - Rank: 1st

Population (2022)
  - Total: 209,669
  - Rank: 7th
  - Density: 51.50/km^{2} (133.4/sq mi)

GDP
  - Total: ֏ 224.241 billion (US$ 465 million)
  - Per capita: ֏ 974,118 (US$ 2,019)
- Time zone: AMT (UTC+04)
- Postal code: 1201–1626
- ISO 3166 code: AM.GR
- FIPS 10-4: AM04
- HDI (2022): 0.748 high · 11th
- Website: Official website

Gegharkunik (Armenian: Գեղարքունիք, Armenian pronunciation: [ɡɛʁɑɾkʰuˈnikʰ]) is a province (marz) of Armenia. Its capital and largest city is Gavar. Gegharkunik is inhabited by approximately 209,669 people and the majority are ethnic Armenians.

Gegharkunik Province is located at the eastern part of Armenia, bordering Azerbaijan. It includes the exclave of Artsvashen, which has been under Azerbaijani occupation since the First Nagorno-Karabakh War. With an area of 5,348 km^{2} (2,065 sq mi), Gegharkunik is the largest province in Armenia. However, approximately 24% or 1,278 km^{2} (493 sq mi) of its territory is covered by Lake Sevan, the largest lake in the South Caucasus and a major tourist attraction of the region.

The Yerevan-Sevan-Dilijan republican highway runs through the province.

== Etymology and symbols ==
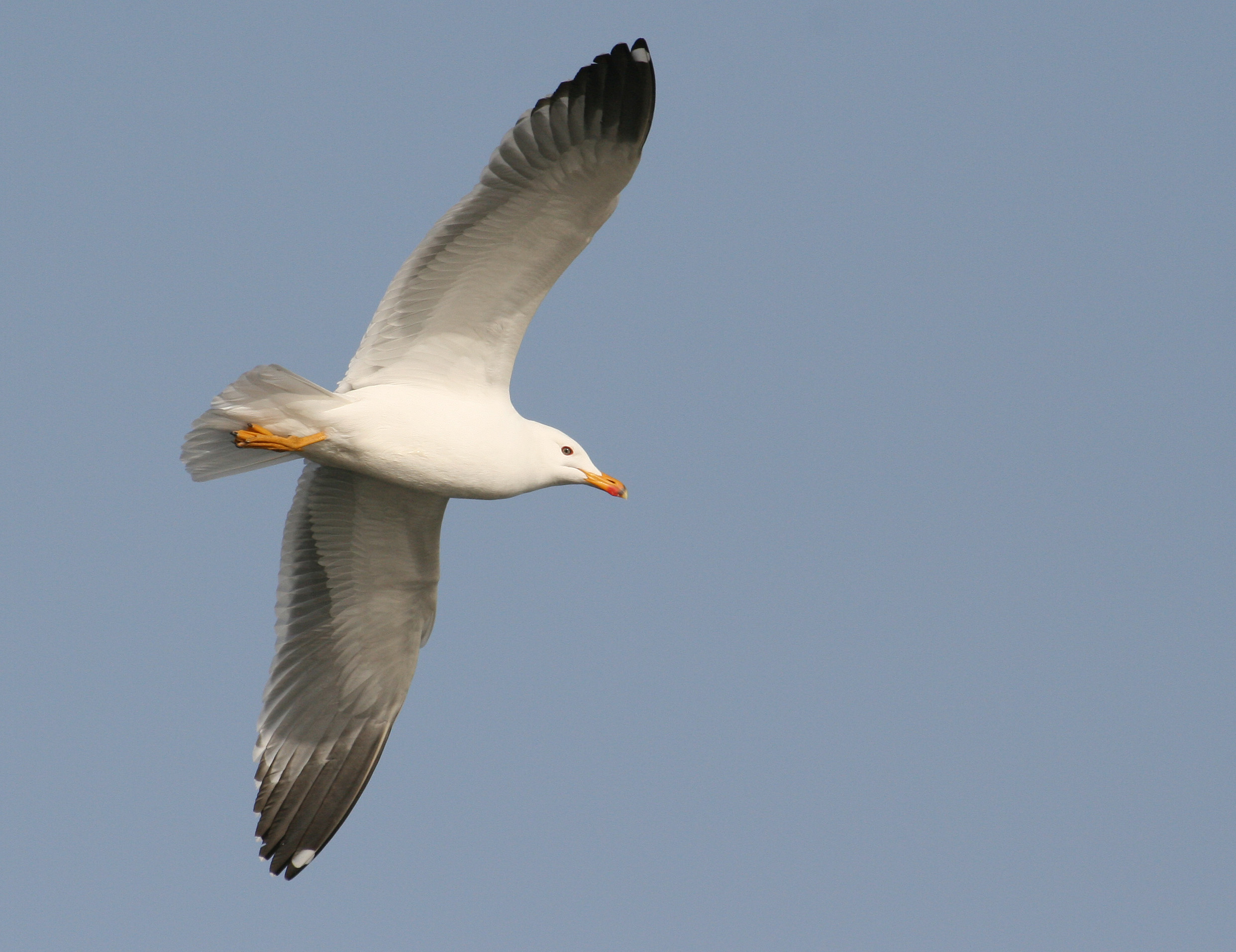
Armenian gull flying over lake Sevan

The early Armenian history Movses Khorenatsi connected the name of Gegharkunik with Gegham, a 5th-generation descendant of the legendary patriarch and founder of the Armenian nation Hayk. Gegham was the father of Sisak (founder of the Siunia dynasty) and Harma (grandfather of Ara the Beautiful). The Gegham Mountains and the Lake of Gegham (currently known as Lake Sevan) were also named after Gegham.

The region of Gegharkunik has been connected to Uelikuni/Uelikuhi, attested in Urartian sources as one of the local "kingdoms" conquered by Urartu in the eighth century BCE. The word "Uel" is believed to be an early (proto-Armenian) version of "Gegh" (proto-Indo European u corresponds with g in Armenian, l corresponds with the Armenian gh).

Armenian gull is the symbol of the province. It is depicted on the Gegharkunik coat of arms adopted on 4 May 2011, flying over the Lake Sevan and its peninsula, surrounded by the mountains of Sevan. The wheat ears on both sides of the coat of arms represent the agricultural characteristic of the province, while the opened book at the bottom represents the intellectual and cultural heritage of the region.

== Geography ==
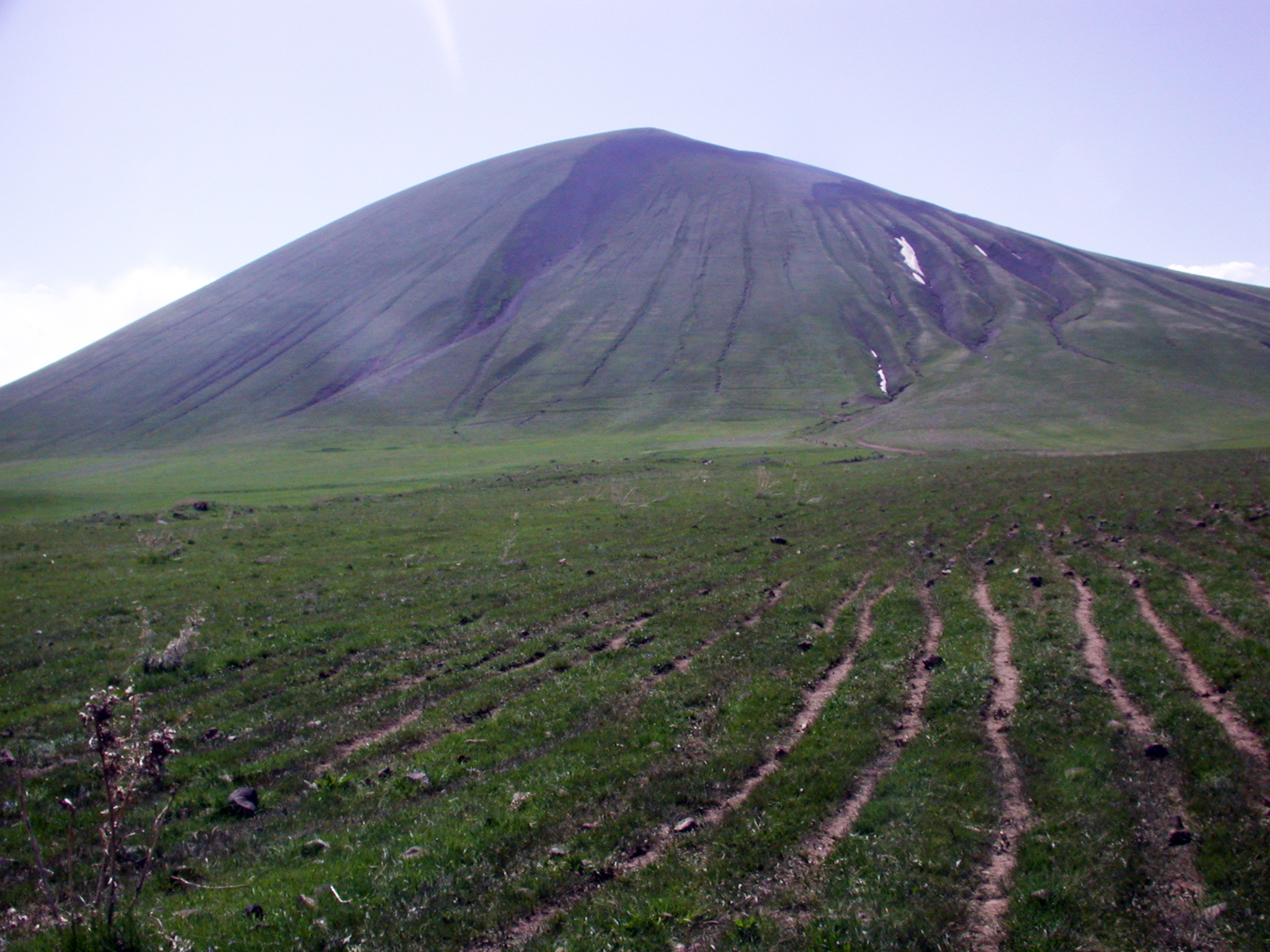
Mount Armaghan (2829 m.) of the Gegham mountains

Gegharkunik Province occupies the east of the central part of modern-day Armenia. With an area of 5,349 km^{2} (18% of total area of Armenia), it is ranked first among the provinces of Armenia in terms of the total area.

Gegharkunik Province is situated at the east of modern-day Armenia, surrounding the Lake Sevan. Within Armenia, it borders Tavush Province to the north, Kotayk and Ararat provinces to the west and Vayots Dzor Province to the south. The Dashkasan, Gadabay and Kalbajar districts of Azerbaijan form the eastern border of the province. From 1993 to 2020, the province shared a border with the unrecognized Republic of Artsakh, when the Kalbajar District of Azerbaijan was administered as the Shahumyan Province of Artsakh. The Armenian exclave of Artsvashen in Gegharkunik Province is currently occupied and controlled by Azerbaijan.

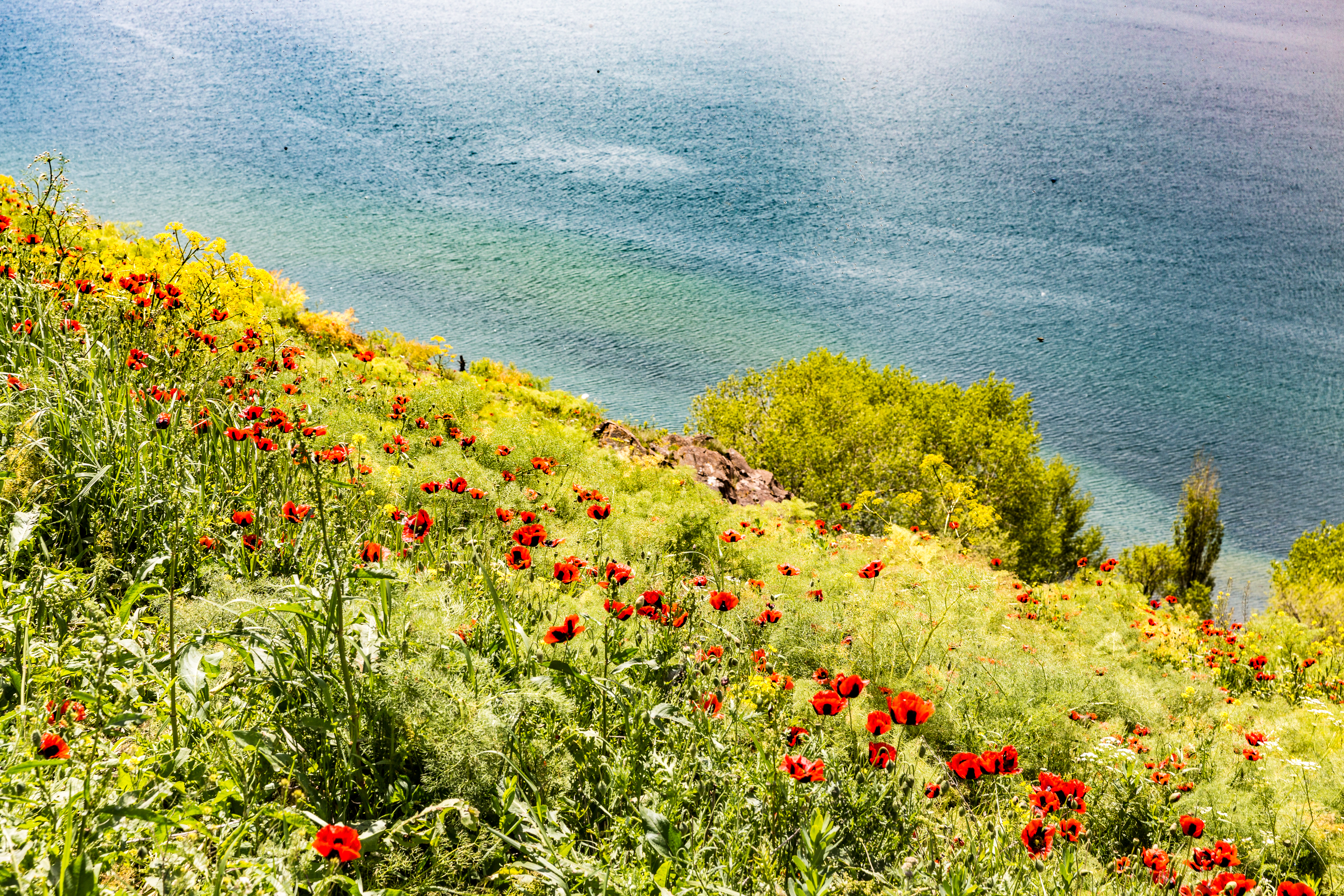
Poppies on the shores of Sevan

Gegharkunik has a mountainous landscape. Its territory is dominated by the Gegham Mountains in the west, the Vardenis Mountains in the south, the Sevan Mountains in the east, the Miapor Mountains in the northeast and the Kenats Mountains in the north of the province. The height of the mountains ranges between 2500 and 3500 meters. Gegharkunik is separated from Vayots Dzor by the 82 kilometer-long Vardenis Mountains, where the highest point is Mount Vardenis at 3,522 meters. The highest point of the province is Mount Azhdahak of the Gegham Mountains with a height of 3597 meters in the western part of the range.

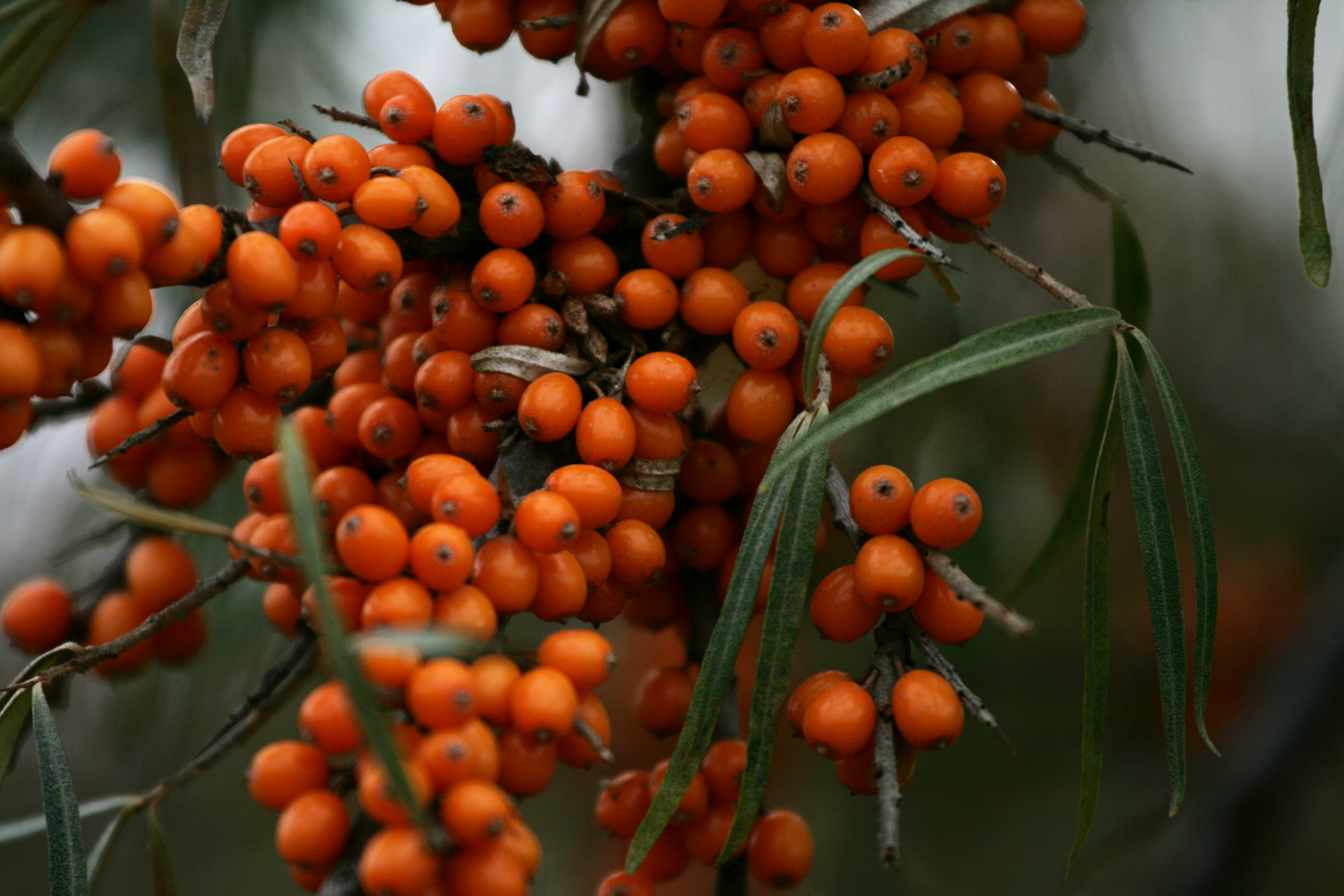
Hippophae rhamnoides at the Sevan Botanical Garden

Lake Sevan occupies the central part of the province, lying at a height of 1900 meters above sea level and covering an area of 1260 km^{2} (around 23.5% of the area of Gegharkunik). The lake is the largest body of fresh water in Armenia and the entire South Caucasus. With a volume of around 32.92 billion m^{3} of water, Sevan is of a major environmental importance for the entire region. Getik, Gavaraget and Masrik are the main rivers of the province.

The climate of Gegharkunik is cold and snowy in winter, while the summer is characterized with warm and humid climate. The annual precipitation level ranges between 500 and 600 mm at below 2000 meters, while it may reach up to 1000 mm in the mountainous areas.

== History ==
Historically, the current territory of the province mainly occupies the Gegharkunik and Sotk cantons of the Syunik province of Ancient Armenia, along with parts of Mazaz and Varazhnunik cantons of Ayrarat province.

From 1930 until 1995, modern-day Gegharkunik was divided into 5 raions within the Armenian SSR: Sevan raion, Kamo raion, Krasnoselsk raion, Martuni raion and Vardenis raion. With the territorial administration reform of 1995, the 5 raions were merged to form the Gegharkunik Province.

After the 2020 Nagorno-Karabakh war, the length of the province's border with Azerbaijan increased. Starting on 12 May 2021, Azerbaijani troops advanced into Gegharkunik province and established positions near the villages of Kut and Verin Shorzha, precipitating a border crisis between Armenia and Azerbaijan. On 25 May 2021, an Armenian soldier was killed by Azerbaijani fire in Gegharkunik, and two days later on 27 May, six Armenian soldiers were captured by Azerbaijani forces in Gegharkunik while carrying out engineering work near the border with Azerbaijan.

== Demographics ==
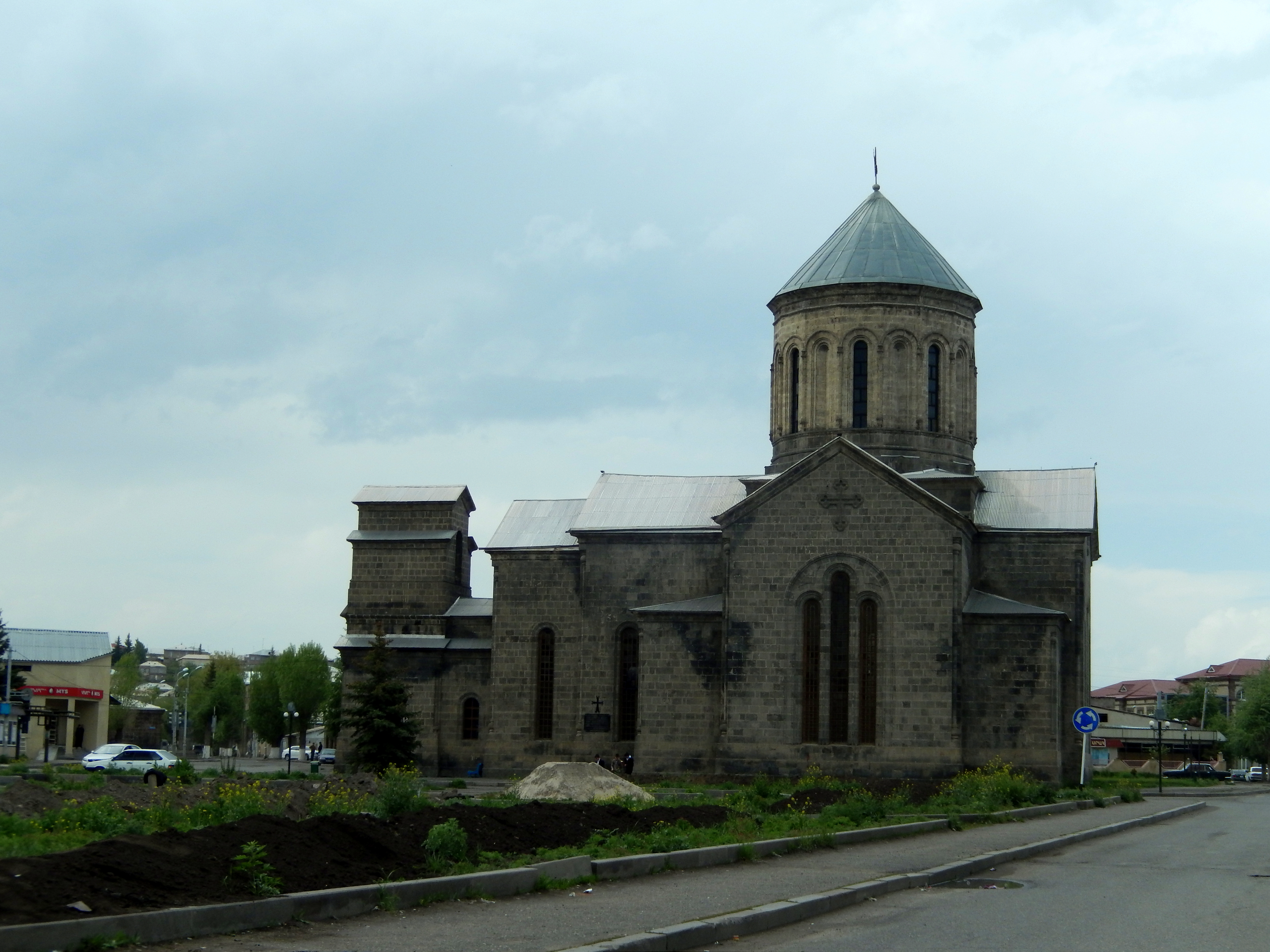
Cathedral of the Holy Mother of God in Gavar

=== Population ===
According to the 1989 Soviet census, the Gegharkunik Province (then part of the Vardenis, Kamo, Krasnoselsk, Martuni, and Sevan districts in 1930–1995) had a population of 230,548. 58,185 or 25.24% of which was urban, distributed into the cities of Kamo (31,234) and Sevan (26,951), and 172,363 or 74.76% were rural, distributed into the districts of Vardenis (31,282), Kamo (30,555), Krasnoselsk (16,428), Martuni (75,866), and Sevan (18,232).

According to the 2022 official census, Gegharkunik has a population of 209,669 (105,084 men and 104,585 women), forming around 7.1% of the entire population of Armenia. The urban population is 65,667 (31.3%) and the rural is 144,002 (68.7%). The province has 5 urban and 87 rural communities. The largest urban community is the provincial centre of Sevan, with a population of 18,705. The other urban centres of are Gavar, Martuni, Vardenis and Chambarak.

With a population of 9,880, the village of Vardenik is the largest rural municipality of Gegharkunik. Vardenik is also the largest rural community in Armenia.

== Administrative divisions ==
Gegharkunik Province is currently divided into 5 municipalities or enlarged communities (hamaynkner).

- A cross denotes a town (urban settlement), otherwise, the settlements are villages (rural settlements).

Municipality	Area (km^{2})	Population (2022 census)	Centre	Settlements
Chambarak		12,597	Chambarak†	Antaramej, Artsvashen, Aygut, Barepat, Dprabak, Dzoravank, Getik, Kalavan, Martuni, Ttujur, Vahan
Gavar	16	47,508	Gavar†	
Martuni	10	78,041	Martuni†	
Sevan		36,258	Sevan†	Gagarin
Vardenis		35,265	Vardenis†	Ayrk, Azat, Geghamabak, Jaghatsadzor, Kut, Nerkin Shorzha, Norabak, Shatjrek, Shatvan Verin Shorzha

Rural communities and included settlements:

- Akhpradzor
- Akunk
- Artsvanist
- Astghadzor
- Berdkunk
- Chkalovka
- Ddmashen
- Dzoragyugh
- Gandzak
- Geghakar
- Geghamasar Municipality, centre: Sotk
  - Areguni
  - Arpunk
  - Avazan
  - Azat
  - Daranak
  - Geghamabak
  - Geghamasar
  - Jaghatsadzor
  - Kakhakn
  - Kut
  - Kutakan
  - Norabak
  - Pambak
  - Pokr Masrik
  - Shatjrek
  - Shatvan
  - Tretuk
- Geghamavan
- Gegharkunik
- Geghhovit
  - Lernahovit
- Hayravank
- Karchaghbyur
- Karmirgyugh
- Khachaghbyur
- Lanjaghbyur
- Lchap
- Lchashen
- Lchavan
- Lichk
- Lusakunk
- Madina
- Makenis
- Mets Masrik
- Nerkin Getashen
- Norakert
- Norashen
- Noratus
- Sarukhan
- Semyonovka
- Shoghakat
  - Aghberk
  - Artanish
  - Drakhtik
  - Jil
  - Tsapatagh
- Torfavan
- Tsaghkashen
- Tsaghkunk
- Tsakkar
- Tsovagyugh
- Tsovasar
- Tsovazard
- Tsovak
- Tsovinar
- Vaghashen
- Vanevan
- Vardadzor
- Vardenik
- Varser
- Verin Getashen
- Yeranos
- Zolakar
- Zovaber

In recent years, many rural settlements in Gegharkunik have been abandoned, such as the villages of Chapkut, Chichakli, Karakoyun, Karmirkharab, Kizilkharaba, Nshkhark and Zariver.

== Culture ==
There are cultural palaces and many public libraries in the urban settlements of the province. A geological museum operates in Sevan on the basis of the Sevan Botanical Garden. Gavar is home to a history museum as well as drama theatre.

The cuisine of Gavar is closely related with the oriental cuisine elements, characterized with various spices, vegetables, fish, and fruits combination. One of the famous sweets of the town is the Kyavar baklava which is a many-layered pastry with tissue-thin sheets of phyllo dough, filled with nuts and sugar and finished with a dousing of hot honey.

The summer presidential residence of Armenia is located at the Sevan Peninsula.

=== Fortresses and archaeological sites ===
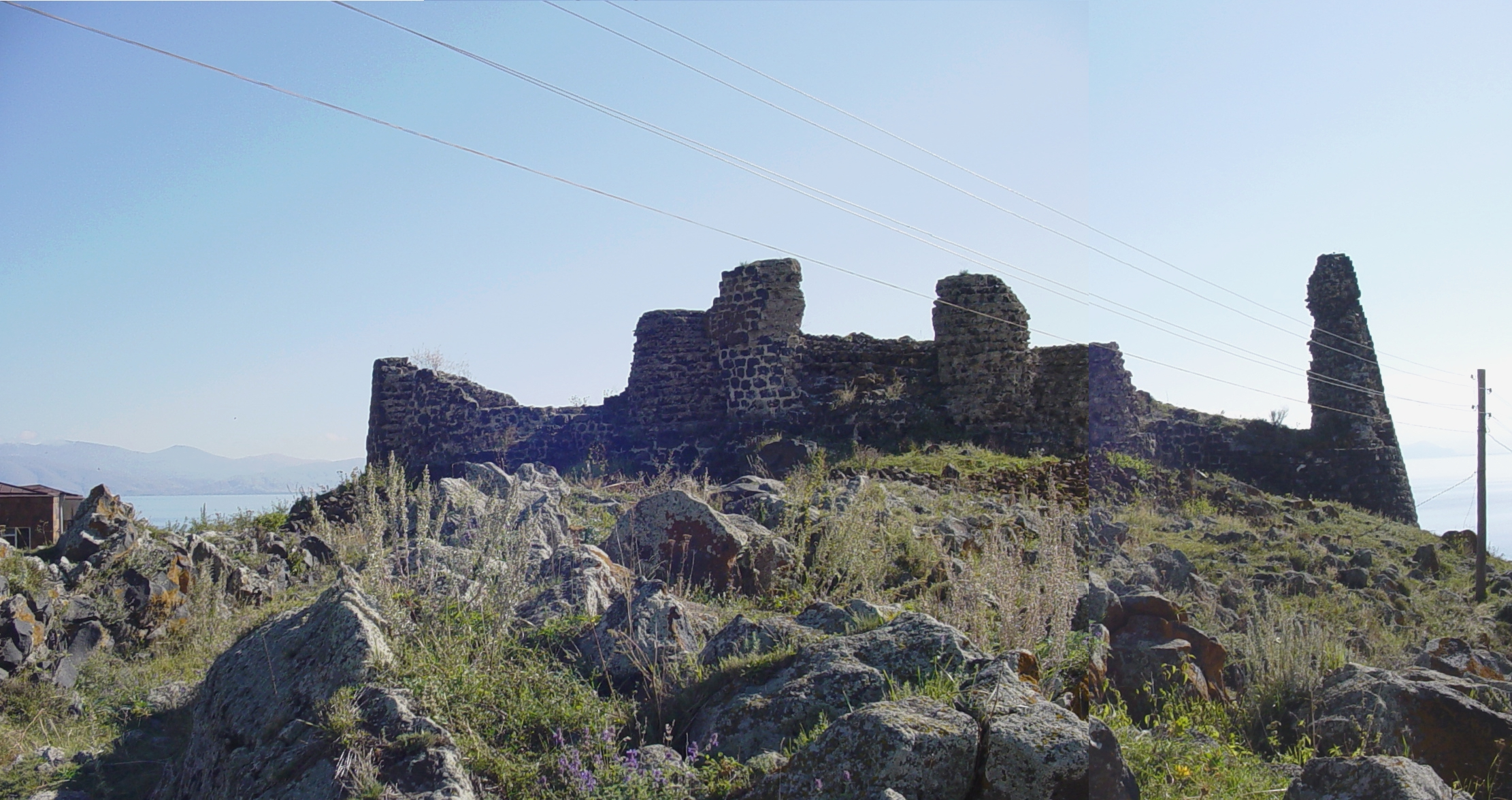
Berdkunk Fortress

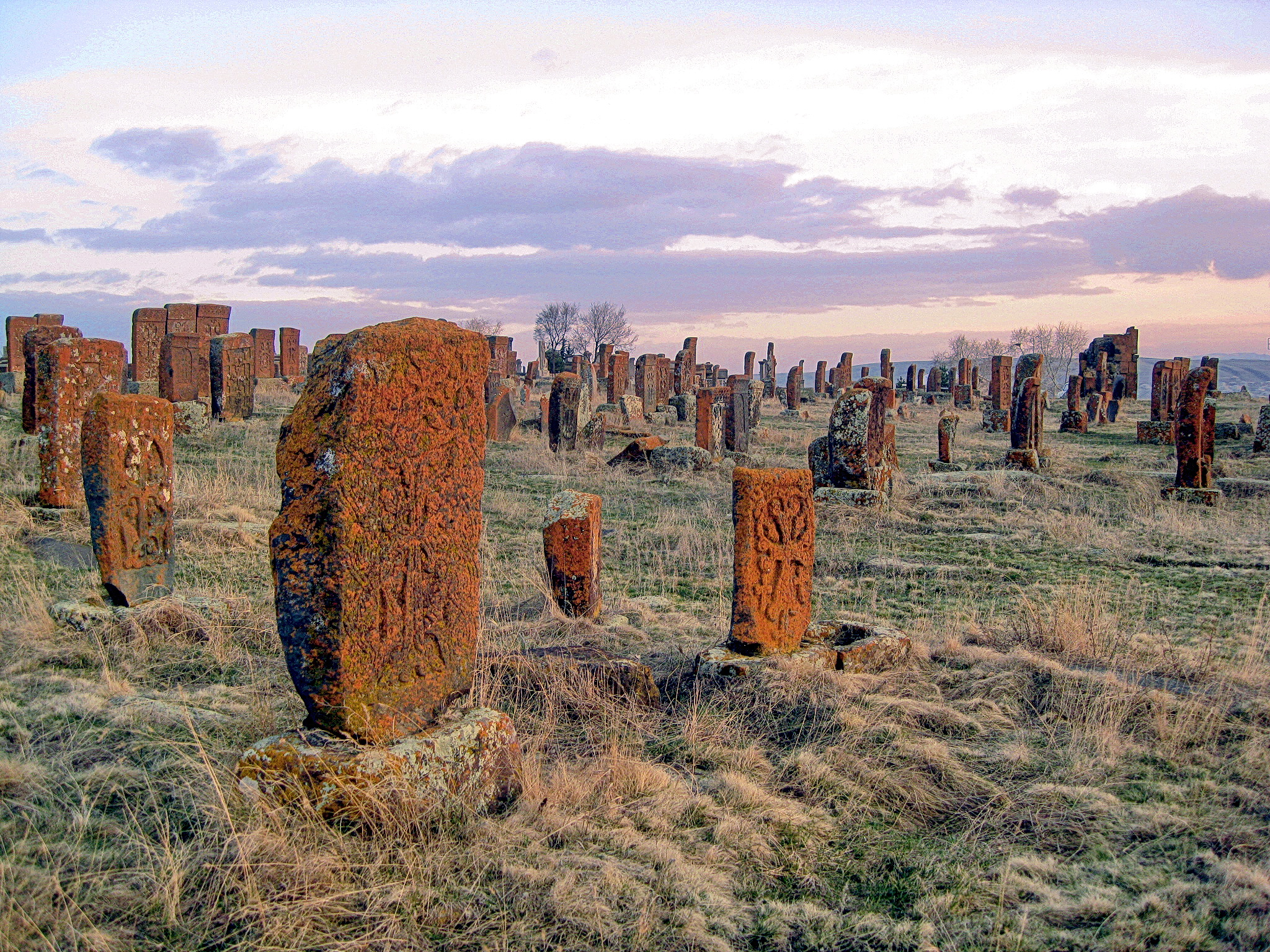
Noratus cemetery

- Mount Azhdahak Petroglyphs: A great number of prehistoric petroglyphs have been found in the surroundings of Mount Azhdahak. Most images depict men in scenes of hunting and fighting, as well as astronomical bodies and phenomena: the Sun, the Moon, constellations, the stellar sky, lightning, and many others.
- Lchashen Cyclopean Fortress: the site is home to an ancient settlement, a burial place and a cyclopean fortress dating back to the 4th millennium-7th century BC.
- Sevsar Ancient Astronomical Observatory: at the western slopes of Mount Sevsar, dating back to the 3rd-1st millennia BC. Recent studies suggest the birthplace of the naming of the constellations and the creation of the zodiac is in the Armenian plateau.
- Berdkunk Fortress of the 1st millennium BC
- Teyseba archaeological site of the Urartian period, 8th century BC
- Odzaberd fortress, 8th century BC
- Noratus cemetery of the 10th century

=== Churches and monasteries ===
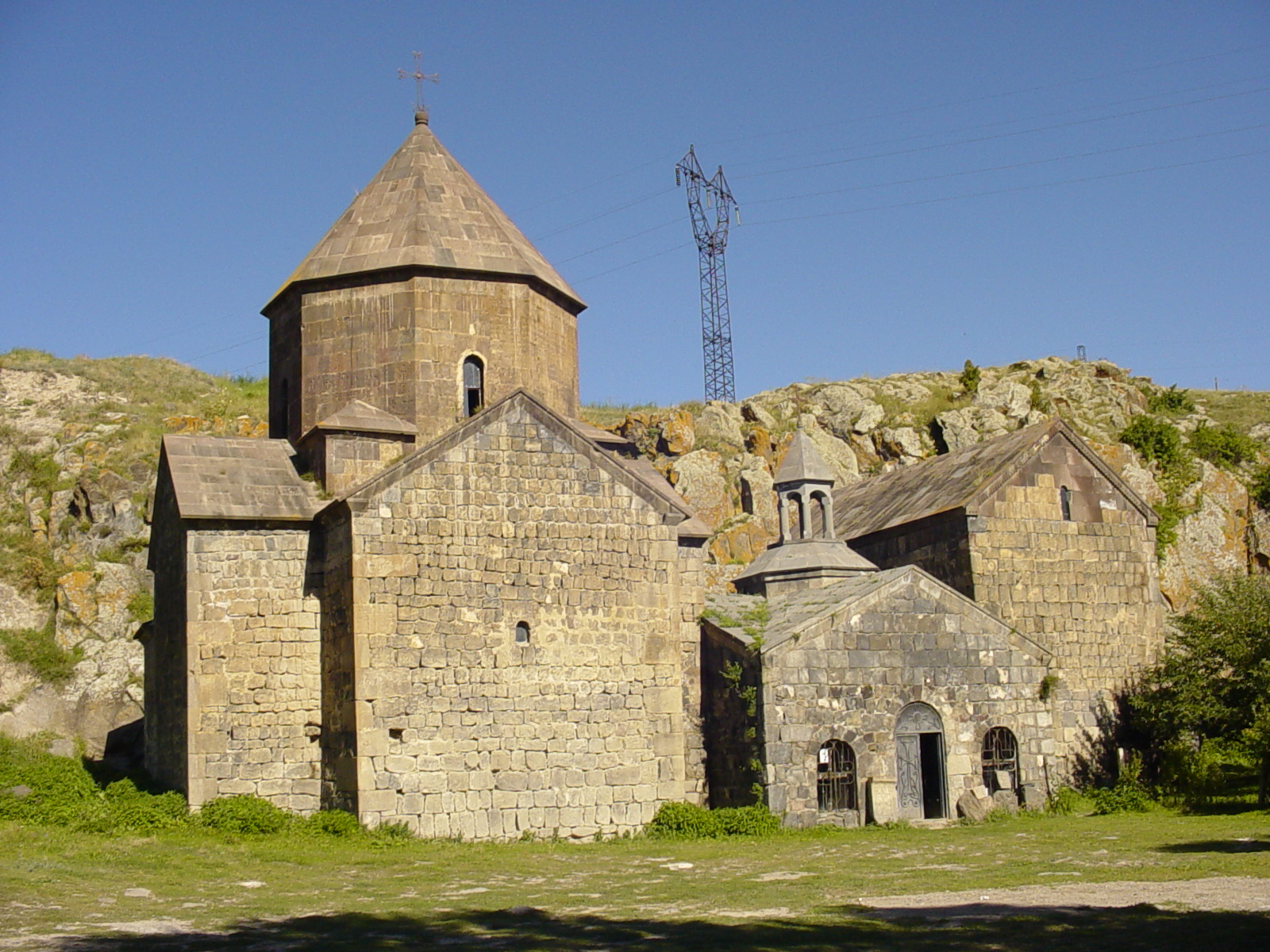
Vanevan Monastery

- Shoghagavank Monastery of the 5th century
- Saint Thaddeus Church of Ddmashen, 7th century
- Hatsarat Monastery of the 7th century
- Sevanavank monastic complex of the 9th century
- Hayravank Monastery of the 9th century
- Makenyats Vank monastic complex of the 9th century
- Kotavank monastery of the Holy Mother of God, 9th century
- Surp Hovhannes Church of Tsaghkashen, 9th century
- Shoghagavank monastic complex of the 9th century
- Vanevan Monastery, opened in 903

=== Media ===
Gegharkunik has four regional TV stations:

- Zangak TV, based in Martuni, operating since 1996
- Kyavar TV, based in Gavar, operating since 1997
- Sevan TV (STV 1), based in Sevan, operating since 1999
- Geghama TV, based in Sevan, operating since 2010

== Transportation ==
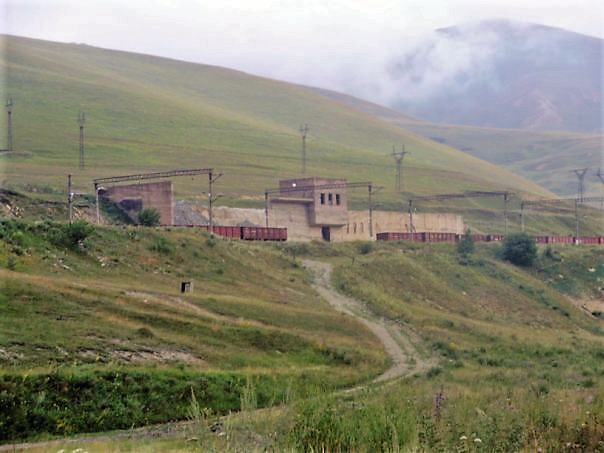
Sotk railway station

The province is connected with other parts of Armenia through the M-4, M-10 and M-14 Motorways. The M-11 Motorway that passes through Martuni and Vardenis connects the province with the town of Karvachar of the Nagorno-Karabakh Republic. The Vardenis-Martakert highway, the second highway connecting Armenia with Nagorno-Karabakh, was opened in September 2017. Part of the highway came under the control of Azerbaijan as a result of the 2020 Nagorno-Karabakh war and currently cannot be used by Armenians.

Sevan has a train station that connects the town with Yerevan through railway. The provincial centre Gavar has had an airstrip since the Soviet years, located to the north of the town.

== Economy ==
=== Agriculture ===
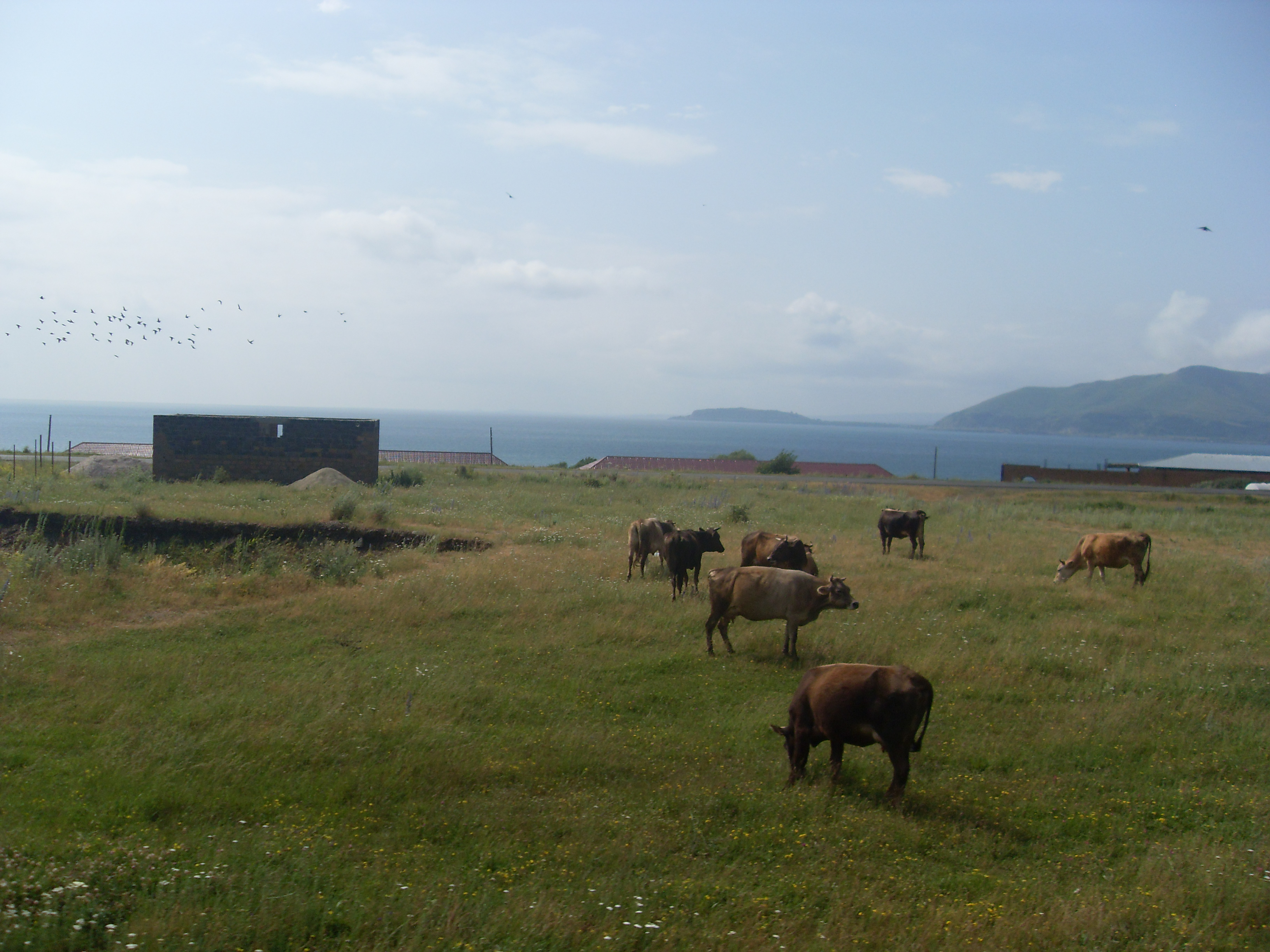
Cattle-breeding near Sevan

The economy of Gegharkunik Province has a predominantly agricultural orientation, including farming and cattle-breeding. It has a share of 18% in the annual total agricultural product of Armenia. Around 65% (3,487 km^{2}) of the total area of the province are arable lands, out of which 27.3% (951.5 km^{2}) are ploughed. Around 60,000 farms in Gegharkunik are operated by the private sector. The main crops are potato and grains.

Fishing and fish farming is also dominant in the province. Recently, beekeeping has significantly developed.

=== Industry ===
Generally, Gegharkunik has a poor industrial index with a small number of operating firms. Currently, the province has a contribution of only 2% in the annual total industrial product of Armenia.

- The Sotk gold mine near Vardenis has one of the largest gold deposits in Armenia. It is owned and operated by the "GeoProMining Gold" company. After the 2020 Nagorno-Karabakh war, half of the mine came under the control of Azerbaijan. The town of Vardenis is home to the "Samelon Vardenis Sea-Buckthorn Processing Plant" for alcoholic beverages and soft drinks, founded in 2000. It is also home to the "Gnel Khachatryan" plant for dairy products, as well as many small furniture manufacturing plants.
- The town of Sevan is home to the beer manufacturers "Lihnitis Sevan Brewery" founded in 2007, with a variety of lager beer under the brand "Kellers". It is also home to the Sevan bread and bakery factory operating since 1947, as well as the Sevan Sugar Plant founded in 2003. The "Yerknain Manana" confectionery plant and the "Tuff-Granite" mining plant are also based in Sevan.
- Gavar is home to the "Gavar Furniture Factory" since 1948, the "Sevan Mineral Water Plant" founded in 1953 (reopened in 2015), the "Aquatic LLC" for processed crayfish founded in 2002, the "Kirakosyan" furniture factory founded in 2006, the "Shushan Production Cooperative" for soft drinks, "Artsrun and Sons" for dairy products in Martuni village, and the "Atast Food" in Verin Getashen.
- Chambarak is home to the Chambarak Cheese Factory as well as the "La-Mar Stone Mining" plant. Martuni is home to the "Arev-1" bread factory (since 1995), and the "Golden Lens" coffee processing plant (since 1998).
- The village of Karmirgyugh is home to the "Yengoyan" carpet factory founded in 1958 (privatized in 1996). The "Arax-2 Production Cooperative" for dairy products is operating in the village of Akunk since 1996. The "Tarzu-Levon" factory for soft drinks is operating in Dzovazard village since 1999. The "AMA Compressor LLC" for industrial equipment is operating in the village of Gagarin since 2003. The "Sahakyan LLC" smart systems manufacturers are operating in Ddmashen village since 2012.

=== Tourism ===
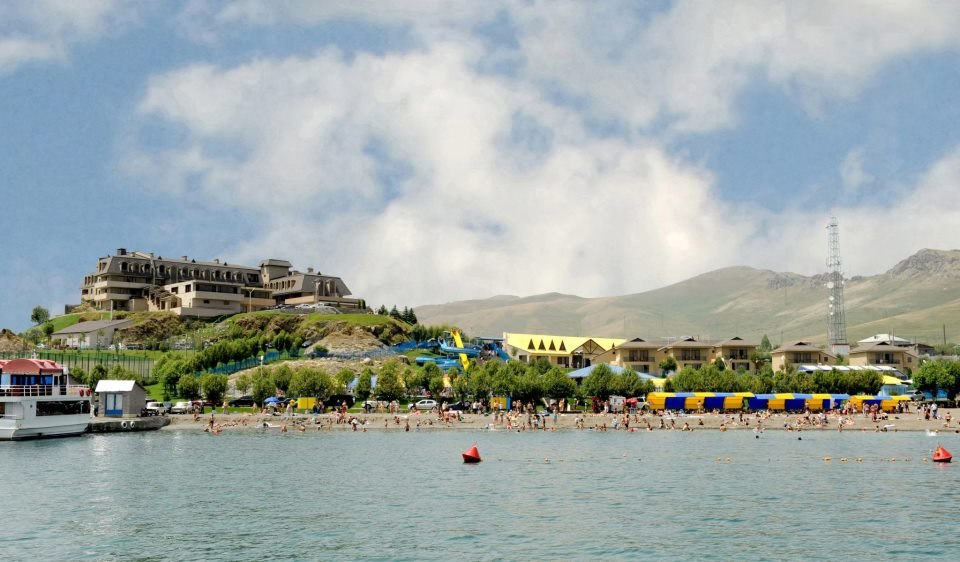
Harsnaqar Hotel and Water Park in Sevan

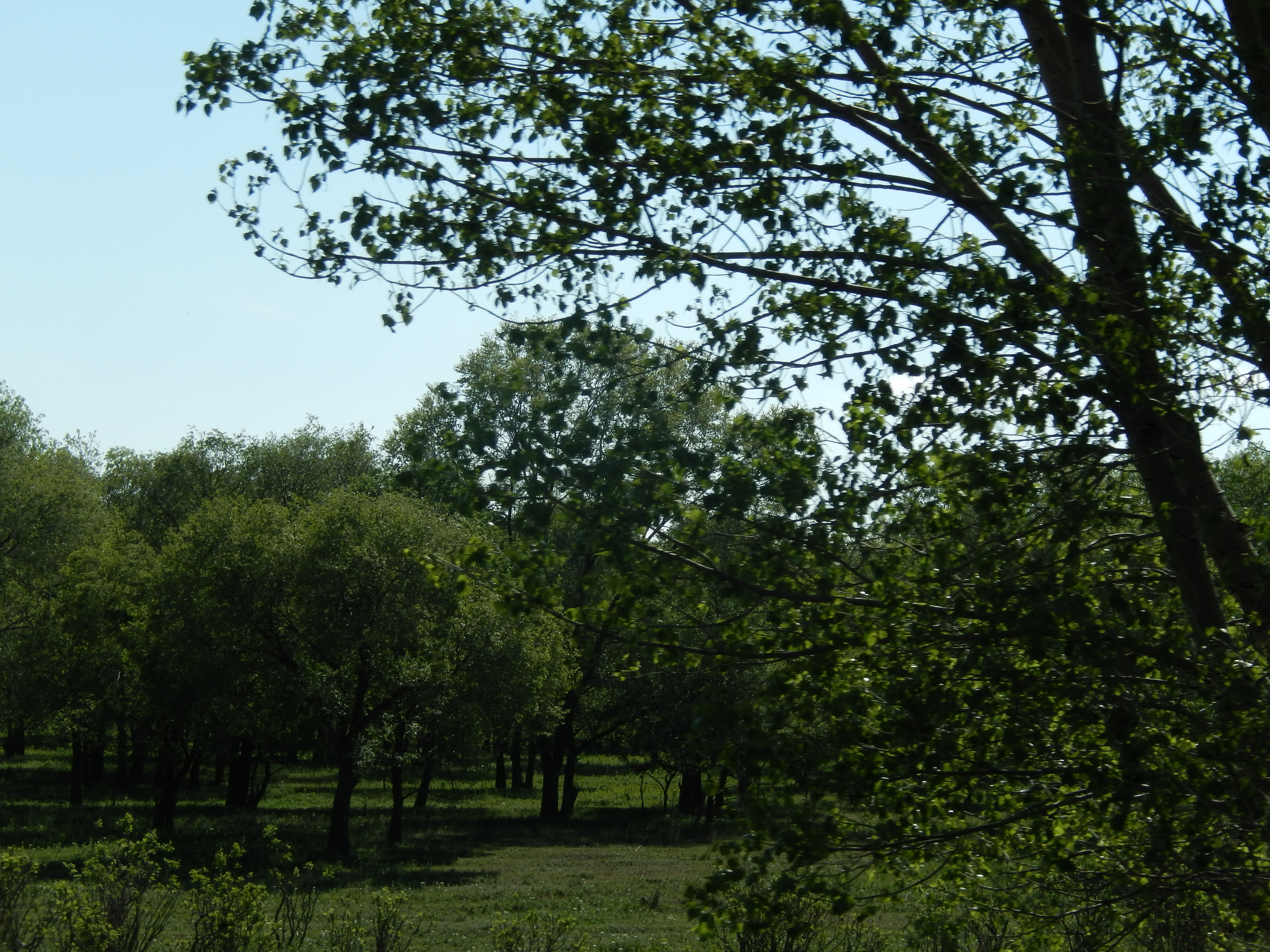
The Juniper Woodlands Sanctuary

Tourism services in Gegharkunik are seasonal. The towns of Sevan, Chambarak and Martuni along with their surrounding beaches are a major summer destination for locals and foreigners with many hotels and resorts. The cultural heritage and the natural monuments of the region attract the tourists too.

During the last decade, many new hotels and spa resorts were opened along the coast of Lake Sevan, including the Harsnaqar Hotel and Water Park, the Best Western Bohemian Resort Sevan, the Akhtamar Sevan Hotel, the Tufenkian Avan Marag Hotel of Tsapatagh, the Blue Sevan Rest-house near Tsovagyugh, the Maria Resort Sevan and the Lavanda City cottages.

In February 2011, the Sevan ropeway was opened at the north of the town, in the area known as "mashtotsner", on the way to Tsovagyugh village. It has a length of 1,130 meters.

Many forests of the province are listed among the protected areas of Armenia, including the Sevan National Park, the Getik Sanctuary, and the Juniper Woodlands Sanctuary of the mountains of Sevan. The Sevan Botanical Garden is also a major destination for the lovers of ecotourism.

== Education ==
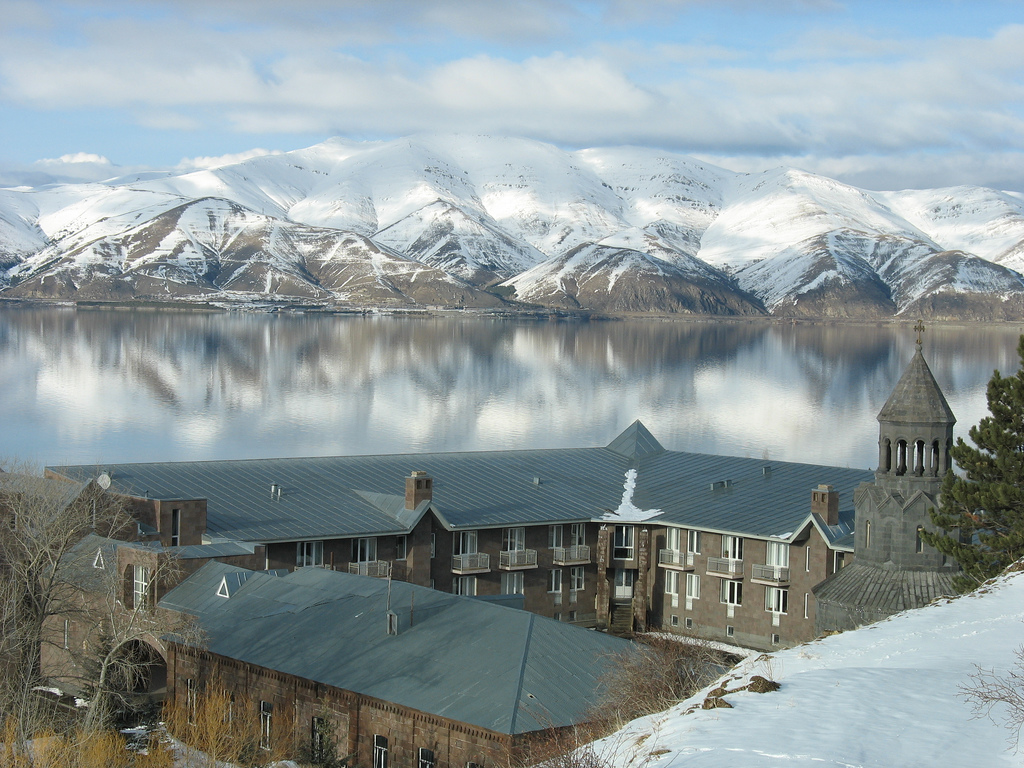
The Vaskenian Theological Academy

As of 2016, Gegharkunik Province has 126 public schools.

Two major educational institutions currently operating in Gegharkunik are:

- The Gavar State University was opened in 1993 after the independence of Armenia. With its five faculties the university is a major educational centre for the entire province of Gegharkunik. It provides degrees in philology, Natural Sciences, Humanities, Economics and Education. Now more than 2,400 students are attending the university.
- The Vaskenian Theological Academy on the Sevan peninsula is a leading institution of theological studies, Armenian literature, history, art, liturgy and traditions of the Armenian Church.

== Sport ==
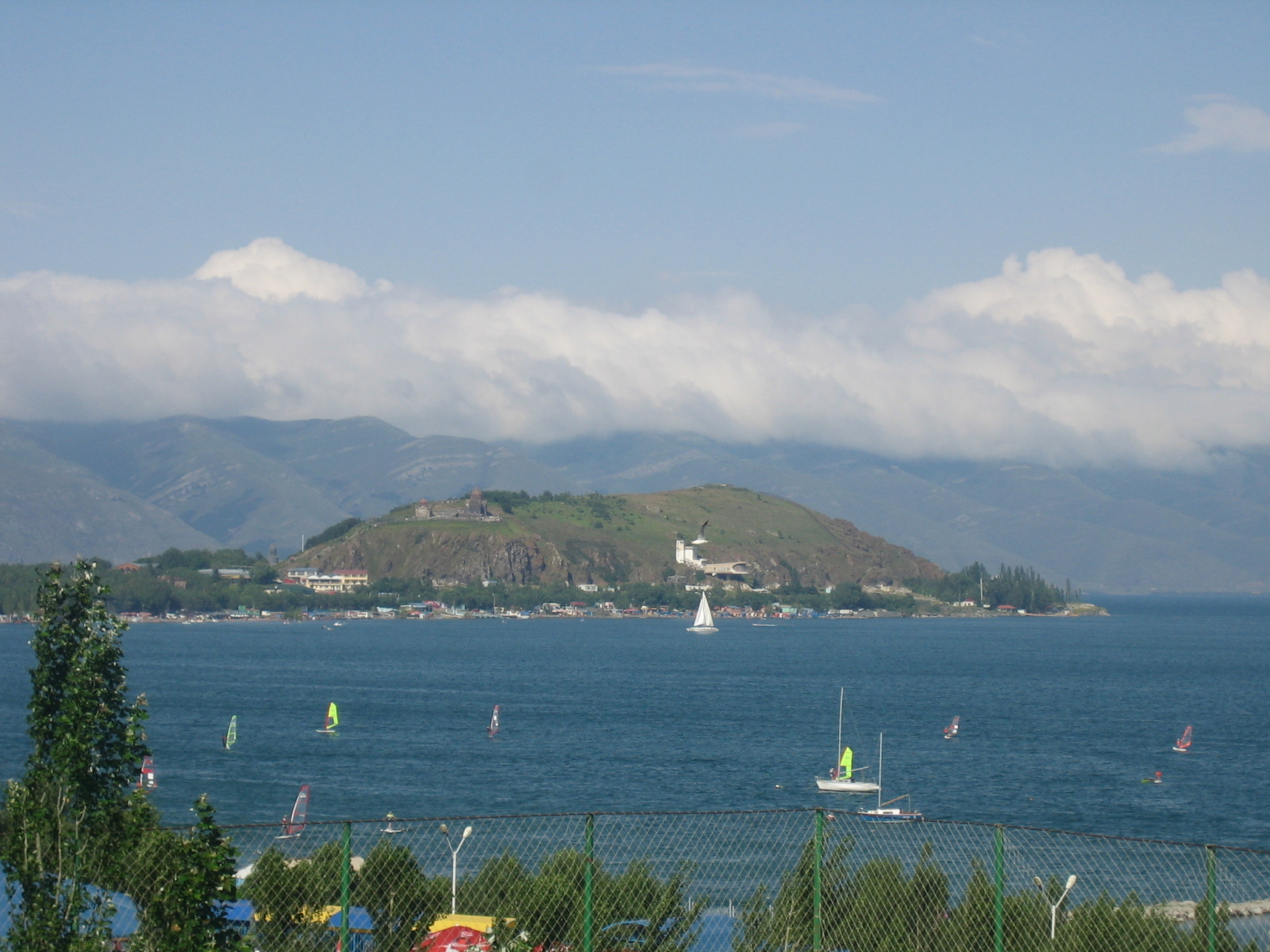
Windsurfing in Sevan

During the brief summer of the region, Sevan and the nearby beaches tun into a popular beach resort. Many professionals and amateurs visit the region to practice their favourite types of sports including beach soccer, beach volleyball and windsurfing.

The defunct football teams of FC Akhtamar Sevan and Lernagorts Vardenis FC represented the province at the domestic competitions during the 1990s. Alashkert FC represented town of Martuni between 1990 and 2000 before being relocated to Yerevan.

There are football stadiums with small seating capacities in Sevan, Martuni, Vardenis and the village of Lchashen.

== People ==
Natives of the province include:

- Ivan Gevorkian (1907–1989), Soviet-Armenian surgeon and scientist
- Vram Dovlatyan (1923–2005), Armenian chemist
- Frunze Dovlatyan (1927–1997), film director, actor and screenwriter.
- Hranush Hakobyan (1954–), politician and former minister of diaspora.
- Arsen Grigoryan (1982–), Armenian singer and actor.

== See also ==
- Lake Sevan
