= List of castles in Armenia =

Overview of Armenian castles

In total, there are approximately 293 castles or ruins of castles in Armenia.

== Castles in Aragatsotn Province ==
Castles in the Aragatsotn Province include:

#	Image	Name	Date	Location	Image
1		Ashot Erkat, Ashnak	3rd-5th century	Ashnak	
2		First castle, Ashnak	3rd-5th century	Ashnak	
3		Second castle, Ashnak	3rd-5th century	Ashnak	
4		Berdi Kal, Akunq	BC 2-1 millennium	Akunk	
5		Zuygaghbyur Fortress	BC 2 millennium	Antarut	
6		Avan Castle	Middle Ages	Avan	
7		Dzyanberd	BC 3-1 millennium	Avan	
8		Kuzmame Castle	Middle Ages	Avan	
9		Averak Berd, Ara	BC 2-1 millennium	Arayi	
10		Qyor Oghli Berd, Aragatsotn	17th-18th century	Aragatsotn	
11		Artashavan Castle	16th-18th century	Artashavan	
12		Poshti Dar Castle	4th-5th century	Artashavan	
13		Gazanots Fortress	BC 3-1 millennium	Artashavan	
14		Gndaqar Fortress	BC 2-1 millennium	Artashavan	
15	Արուճի բերդ Aruch Castle	Aruch Castle	5th-17th century	Aruch	Արուճի բերդ Aruch Castle
16		Dzori Berd Fortress	BC 3 millennium	Aruch	
17		Takya Castle	Middle Ages	Bazmaghbyur	
18		Aytsaberd	BC 2-1 millennium	Byurakan	
19		Inaqlu Dar Fortress	BC 2-1 millennium	Byurakan	
20		Shishkond Fortress	BC 2 millennium	Byurakan	
21	Ամբերդ Amberd	Amberd	10th-14th century	Byurakan	Ամբերդ Amberd
22		Ashot Erkat, Gegharot	BC 2-1 millennium	Gegharot	
23		Poloz Sar Fortress	BC 2-1 millennium	Gegharot	
24	Քաղենիի ամրոց Dashtadem Fortress	Dashtadem Fortress	7th-19th century	Dashtadem	Քաղենիի ամրոց Dashtadem Fortress
25		Dian Castle	17th-18th century	Dian	
26		Berdi Lanj Fortress	BC 2-1 millennium	Lernapar	
27		Khucher Castle	17th century	Lernarot	
28		Aver Berd	BC 2-1 millennium	Lusagyugh	
29		Kharabek Fortress	BC 1 millennium	Tsaghkasar	
30		Tsilkar Fortress	BC 2-1 millennium	Tsilkar	
31	Կաթնաղբյուրի ամրոց Katnaghbyur Castle	Katnaghbyur Castle	1st century	Katnaghbyur	Կաթնաղբյուրի ամրոց Katnaghbyur Castle
32	ԶԱՔԱՐԻ ԲԵՐԴ Zakari Berd	Zakari Berd	3rd-5th century	Katnaghbyur	ԶԱՔԱՐԻ ԲԵՐԴ Zakari Berd
33		Areni Berd, Karbi	17th-18th century	Karbi	
34		Kaqavadzor Castle	5th century	Kaqavadzor	
35		Berd Castle, Kosh	BC 2-1 millennium	Kosh	
36		Qarhanqi Berd	3rd century	Kosh	
37	Ամրոց "Աղջկա բերդ" Kosh Fortress	Kosh Fortress	13th-14th century	Kosh	Ամրոց "Աղջկա բերդ" Kosh Fortress
38		Khaznakar Fortress	8th-10th century	Dzoraglukh	
39	Ամրոց "Բերդի գլուխ" Berdi Glukh	Berdi Glukh, Dzoraglukh	BC 10th-8th century	Dzoraglukh	Ամրոց "Բերդի գլուխ" Berdi Glukh
40		Angrsak Fortress	16th-18th century	Ghazaravan	
41		Nerkin Bazmaberd Sev Berd	BC 2-1 millennium	Nerkin Bazmaberd	
41		Nerkin Bazmaberd Castle	Middle Ages	Nerkin Bazmaberd	
42		First castle in Nerkin Sasnashen	5th century	Nerkin Sasnashen	
43	Ներքին Սասնաշեն ԱՄՐՈՑ Castle	Second castle in Nerkin Sasnashen	6th-7th century	Nerkin Sasnashen	Ներքին Սասնաշեն ԱՄՐՈՑ Castle
44		Ghalacha Castle	BC 2 millennium	Nigatun	
45	Շղարշիկ ԱՄՐՈՑ "ՂԱԼԱՉԻ" Ghalachi	Ghalachi Castle	BC 2-1 millennium	Shgharshik	Շղարշիկ ԱՄՐՈՑ "ՂԱԼԱՉԻ" Ghalachi
46		Akhtamir Fortress	9th-19th century	Voskevaz	
47		Horomi Paler Castle	BC 2-1 millennium	Chknagh	
48		Sasuniki Dashter Castle	BC 2 millennium	Sasunik	
49		Berdashen Castle, Aragatsotn	Middle Ages	Vardenis	
50		Vardenut Castle	11th-14th century	Vardenut	
51	Վերին Բազմաբերդ ԱՄՐՈՑ Castle	Verin Bazmaberd Castle	BC 2-1 millennium	Verin Bazmaberd	Վերին Բազմաբերդ ԱՄՐՈՑ Castle
52		Eloyi Berd Fortress	BC 3-1 millennium	Kuchak	
53		Vasakamut Fortress	BC 2-1 millennium	Ohanavan	
54		Sev Blur Castle, Ohanavan	BC 2 millennium	Ohanavan	
55		Serkyevil Castle	11th-13th century	Ohanavan	
56	Օրգով ԱՄՐՈՑCastle	First castle in Orgov	Middle Ages	Orgov	Օրգով ԱՄՐՈՑCastle
57	Օրգով ԱՄՐՈՑCastle	Second castle in Orgov	BC 2-1 millennium	Orgov	Օրգով ԱՄՐՈՑCastle
58	Օրգով ԱՄՐՈՑ "ԿԱՔԱՎԱԲԵՐԴ" Kaqavaberd in Orgov	Kaqavaberd, Orgov	BC 2-1 millennium	Orgov	Օրգով ԱՄՐՈՑ "ԿԱՔԱՎԱԲԵՐԴ" Kaqavaberd in Orgov
59	ԱՄՐՈՑ First castle in Oshakan	First castle in Oshakan	BC 1 millennium	Oshakan	ԱՄՐՈՑ First castle in Oshakan
60	ԱՄՐՈՑ Didi Kond	Didi Kond, Oshakan	Middle Ages	Oshakan	ԱՄՐՈՑ Didi Kond
61		Yernjak Fortress	Middle Ages	Yernjatap	
62	ԱՄՐՈՑ "ԲԱՌՈԺ" Baroj Castle	Baroj Castle	9th-13th century	Ujan	ԱՄՐՈՑ "ԲԱՌՈԺ" Baroj Castle
63		Zorakayan Castle	15th century	Ujan	
64	ԱՄՐՈՑ "ԲՔՈՅԻ ԳԵՂ" Bqoi Gegh Castle	Bqoi Gegh Castle	10th-20th century	Ujan	ԱՄՐՈՑ "ԲՔՈՅԻ ԳԵՂ" Bqoi Gegh Castle
65	ՄՈՏԿԱՆ ԲԵՐԴ Motkan Berd	Motkan Berd	15th century	Ujan	ՄՈՏԿԱՆ ԲԵՐԴ Motkan Berd
66	Ուշիի Սուրբ Սարգիս վանք Ushi Saint Sarkis Monastery	Ushiberd	10th-18th century	Ushi	Ուշիի Սուրբ Սարգիս վանք Saint-Serge d'Ushi Altar

== Castles in Ararat Province ==
Castles in the Ararat Province include:

#	Image	Name	Date	Location	Image
1		Avshar Castle	BC 2-1 millennium	Avshar	
2		Armash Castle	10th-18th century	Armash	
3	Ամրոց "Կաքավաբերդ" ("Թաթուլի բերդ") Kakavaberd	Kakavaberd	10th-14th century	Berdatak, Khosrov Forest State Reserve	Ամրոց "Կաքավաբերդ" ("Թաթուլի բերդ") Kakavaberd
4		Qsuz Fortress	10th-18th century	Yeghegnavan, Khosrov Forest State Reserve	
5		Lanjar Castle	BC 2-1 millennium	Lanjar	
6		Sagraberd	5th-8th century	Mankunq, Khosrov Forest State Reserve	
7		Urtsadzor Castle	BC 2-1 millennium	Urtsadzor, Khosrov Forest State Reserve	
8		Urtsaberd	4th-13th century	Urtsadzor, Khosrov Forest State Reserve	
9	Ամրոց "Տափի բերդ" ("Գևորգ Մարզպետունի") Tapi berd	Tapi Berd	10th-13th century	Urtsadzor, Khosrov Forest State Reserve	Ամրոց "Տափի բերդ" ("Գևորգ Մարզպետունի") Tapi berd
10		Vedi Castle	8th-13th century	Vedi	

== Castles in Armavir Province ==
Castles in the Armavir Province include:

#	Image	Name	Date	Location	Image
1		Aghavnatun Castle	10th-19th century	Aghavnatun	
2		Aragats Castle, Armavir	19th-20th century	Aragats	
3		Dasht Castle, Armenia	BC 2-1 millennium	Dasht	
4		Lernamerdz Castle	18th century	Lernamerdz	
5		Shenik Castle	3rd-5th century	Shenik	
6		Qarakert Castle	Middle Ages	Qarakert	
7	Ամրոց Սարդարապատ Sardarapat Fortress	Sardarabad	19th century	Sardarapat	Ամրոց Սարդարապատ Sardarapat Fortress

== Castles in Gegharkunik Province ==
Castles in the Gegharkunik Province include:

#	Image	Name	Date	Location	Image
1		Aghi Gyol, Gavar	10th-17th century	Gavar	
2		Dari Glukh, Gavar	BC 2-1 millennium	Gavar	
3		Jami Dar, Gavar	16th-20th century	Gavar	
4		Jangoi Aghl, Gavar	BC 2-1 millennium	Gavar	
5		Khacher, Gavar	BC 2-1 millennium	Gavar	
6		Arnegh Fortress	BC 2-1 millennium	Gavar	
7		Ghamlukh, Gavar	BC 2-1 millennium	Gavar	
8		Mshkoyi Berd, Gavar	BC 2-1 millennium	Gavar	
9		Mrtbi Dzor Berd	BC 2-1 millennium	Gavar	
10		Yonjalukh Castle	9th-17th century	Gavar	
11		Jaghatsi Dar Castle	BC 2-1 millennium	Gavar	
12		Galustaqar Castle	BC 2-1 millennium	Chambarak	
13		Aghlner Castle	BC 1 millennium	Martuni	
14		Dashtadzor Castle	BC 2-1 millennium	Martuni	
15		Heri Berd	BC 2-1 millennium	Martuni	
16		Hsoy Qra Castle	BC 2-1 millennium	Martuni	
17		Metsep Fortress	BC 3-1 millennium	Sevan	
18		Vanki Berd, Astghadzor	BC 2-1 millennium	Astghadzor	
19		Bruti Berd, Artsvanist	BC 1 millennium	Artsvanist	
20		Dasht Ler Castle, Artanish	BC 1 millennium	Artanish	
21		Artanish Castle	18th century	Artanish	
22		Artanish Fortress	16th-18th century	Artanish	
23	Ամրոց "Սպիտակ բերդ" ("Բերդկունք", "Աղկալա", "Իշխանաց բերդ") Berdkunk Fortress	Berdkunk Fortress	10th century	Berdkunk	Ամրոց "Սպիտակ բերդ" ("Բերդկունք", "Աղկալա", "Իշխանաց բերդ") Berdkunk Fortress
24		Geghamasar Castle	15th-16th century	Geghamasar	
25		Geghhovit Alberd	9th century	Geghhovit	
26		Geghhovit Joj Kogh	BC 2-1 millennium	Geghhovit	
27		Mughna Khach Fortress	7th-10th century	Getik	
28		Ddmashen Berdi Dosh	BC 2-1 millennium	Ddmashen	
29		Yeranos Nets Boghaz	BC 3 millennium	Yeranos	
30		Yeranos Dvor	BC 2-1 millennium	Yeranos	
31		Navarakhan Fortress, Zolakar	Middle Ages	Zolakar	
32	Ամրոցի համալիր "Իլիկավանք" ("Պառավի վանք")Paravi Amrots	Paravi Amrots	9th century	Lanjaghbyur	Ամրոցի համալիր "Իլիկավանք" ("Պառավի վանք")Paravi Amrots
33		Lchap castle complex	Middle Ages	Lchap	
34		Khachaghbyur Murad Khach	5th century	Khachaghbyur	
35		Tsovagyugh Castle	12th-20th century	Tsovagyugh	
36		Tsovak Castle	11th-19th century	Tsovak	
37	Ամրոց Թեյշեբաինի (Օձաբերդ) Odzaberd	Odzaberd	BC 8th-6th century	Lanjaghbyur	Ամրոց Թեյշեբաինի (Օձաբերդ) Odzaberd
38		Qare Dur Castle, Karchaghbyur	9th-17th century	Karchaghbyur	
39		Tsaghkavan Castle, Karmirgyugh	BC 2-1 millennium	Karmirgyugh	
40		Qanagegh Castle, Karmirgyugh	17th century	Karmirgyugh	
41		Sangar Fortress, Dzoragyugh	BC 2-1 millennium	Dzoragyugh	
42		Madina Fortress	9th-17th century	Madina	
43		Qare Dzi, Madina	19th century	Madina	
44		Aghjkaghala, Martuni	10th-13th century	Martuni	
45		Berdi Dosh, Martuni	BC 2-1 millennium	Martuni	
46		Gyuney Fortress, Norashen	BC 2-1 millennium	Norashen	
47		Khacher Fortress, Norashen	13th-14th century	Norashen	
48		Wigon Fortress, Norashen	BC 2-1 millennium	Norashen	
49		Heri Dar Fortress, Noratus	BC 2-1 millennium	Noratus	
50		Yot Aghbyur Fortress	9th-17th century	Noratus	
51		Sotk Castle	Middle Ages	Sotk	
52		Hing Qar, Sotk	BC 1 millennium	Sotk	
53		Yot Aghbyur Fortress	9th-17th century	Noratus	
54		Vahan Castle	10th-13th century	Vahan	
55		Aloyi Kogh, Vaghashen	BC 2-1 millennium	Vaghashen	
56		Qrdi Kogh, Vaghashen	BC 1 millennium	Vaghashen	
57		Tsovaberd, Vardadzor	BC 2-1 millennium	Vardadzor	
58		Tulikhu Fortress	BC 5th-1st century	Vardadzor	
59		Berdi Kharaba, Vardenik	9th-16th century	Vardenik	
60		Spitak Banali, Verin Getashen	BC 1 millennium	Verin Getashen	
61		Tatev Castle, Verin Getashen	BC 2-1 millennium	Verin Getashen	

== Castles in Kotayk Province ==
Castles in the Kotayk Province include:

#	Image	Name	Date	Location	Image
1	Ամրոց Castle	Akunk Kotayk Castle	Middle Ages	Akunk	Ամրոց Castle
2	Առնջոց վանք Arnjots vank	Arnjots Vank	17th century	Arinj	Առնջոց վանք Arnjots vank
3		Lusakert Fortress	Middle Ages	Argel	
4		Pyunik Castle	Middle Ages	Pyunik	
5	Բջնու բերդ Bjni Fortress	Bjni Fortress	5th-16th century	Bjni	Բջնու բերդ Bjni Fortress
6		Qyoroghli Fortress	9th-15th century	Buzhakan	
7	Գառնու հեթանոսական տաճար Temple of Garni	Garni Temple	1st-17th century	Garni	Գառնու հեթանոսական տաճար Temple of Garni
8		Katarsar Castle	Middle Ages	Geghashen	
9		Kuriki Qarap Castle	Middle Ages	Geghashen	
10		Goght Castle	16th-17th century	Goght	
11		Tigranaberd, Zar	Middle Ages	Zar	
12	Կարմիր Բերդ Karmir Berd	Karmir Berd, Zovuni	Middle Ages	Zovuni	Կարմիր Բերդ Karmir Berd
13		Zovk Castle	Middle Ages	Zovk	
14		Tghit Fortress	Middle Ages	Teghenik	
15		Kuze Fortress	Middle Ages	Kamaris	
16		Berdi Glukh Castle	Middle Ages	Kaputan	
17		Kaputan Castle	7th-14th century	Kaputan	
18	Ամրոց "Սևաբերդ" Sevaberd	Sevaberd Fortress	10th century	Kaputan	Ամրոց "Սևաբերդ" Sevaberd
19		Astghaberd	Middle Ages	Hatis	
20		Klorberd	Middle Ages	Hatis	
21		Hatsavan Castle	3rd-4th century	Hatsavan	
22		Berdi Glukh, Meghradzor	Middle Ages	Meghradzor	
23		Nurnus Castle	5th-10th century	Nurnus	
24		Ptenis Fortress	Middle Ages	Ptghni	
25		Sraberd	Middle Ages	Sevaberd	

== Castles in Lori Province ==
Castles in the Lori Province include:

#	Image	Name	Date	Location	Image
1		Koshaberd	10th-13th century	Alaverdi	
2		Akhtala Castle	13th century	Akhtala	
3		Tokhmakhkala Fortress	10th-13th century	Akhtala	
4	Ախթալա (Պղնձահանքի վանք, Մարիամ Աննայի վանք, Մեյրիման) Akhtala Monastery	Akhtala Monastery	13th century	Akhtala	Ախթալա (Պղնձահանքի վանք, Մարիամ Աննայի վանք, Մեյրիման) Akhtala
5		Avanaqar Fortress	14th-15th century	Kobayr	
6		Kulet Fortress	14th-15th century	Kobayr	
7		Gogaran Fortress	14th-15th century	Gogaran	
8		Dsegh Castle	Middle Ages	Dsegh	
9		Teghut Castle	13th century	Teghut	
10	Լոռի Բերդ Lori berd	Lori Fortress	11th-18th century	Lori Berd	Լոռի Բերդ Lori berd
11	Ամրոց Սեդվի ("Սեդվա ղալա") Sedvu Berd	Sedvu Berd	13th-14th century	Kachachkut	Ամրոց Սեդվի ("Սեդվա ղալա") Sedvu Berd
12		Sghnakhi Zar Fortress	10th-16th century	Karmir Aghek	
13		Qir Axper Fortress	10th-13th century	Dzoragyugh	
14		Gogavan Castle	12th-17th century	Gogavan	
15		Novoseltsovo Castle	Middle Ages	Novoseltsovo	
16		Kaytson Fortress	10th century	Shnogh	
17	Ամրոց "Կայանբերդ" Kayanberd	Kayan Berd	1233	Haghpat	Ամրոց "Կայանբերդ" Kayanberd
18	Ամրոց Բազաբերդ (Բազկերտ, Չախկալաբերդ, Չըխլաբերդ, Ղալա-Ղալա) Chaghkalaberd	Chaghkalaberd	10th-12th century	Jiliza	Ամրոց Բազաբերդ (Բազկերտ, Չախկալաբերդ, Չըխլաբերդ, Ղալա-Ղալա) Chaghkalaberd
19	Ամրոց "Լոքա" Loka berd	Loka Fortress	17th century	Shnogh	
20		Vardablur Castle	10th-11th century	Vardablur	
21	Ամրոց "Սիսի բերդ" Sisi Berd	Sisi Berd	Middle Ages	Vahagnadzor	Ամրոց "Սիսի բերդ" Sisi Berd

== Castles in Shirak Province ==
Castles in the Shirak Province include:

#	Image	Name	Date	Location	Image
1	Ամրոց "Ալեքսանդրապոլ" ("Մեծ") Aleksandrapol Fortress	Aleksandrapol Fortress	1835–1845	Gyumri	Ամրոց "Ալեքսանդրապոլ" ("Մեծ") Aleksandrapol Fortress
2	Ամրոց "Սև բերդ" ("Հարավային") Sev Berd	Sev Berd	19th century	Gyumri	Ամրոց "Սև բերդ" ("Հարավային") Sev Berd
3		Karmir Berd, Gyumri	19th century	Gyumri	
4		Hayrenyats Taghq Berd	8th-17th century	Artik	
5		Aghvorik Castle	Middle Ages	Aghvorik	
6		Ardenis Castle	3rd century	Ardenis	
7		Al Berd, Arpeni	1st-4th century	Arpeni	
8		Bandivan Castle	3rd century	Bandivan	
9		Bashgyugh Castle	3rd century	Bashgyugh	
10		First castle, Garnarich	3rd century	Garnarich	
11		Second castle, Garnarich	3rd century	Garnarich	
12	Ամրոց Գուսանագյուղում Gusanagyugh Castle	Gusanagyugh Castle	10th-12th century	Gusanagyugh	Ամրոց Գուսանագյուղում Gusanagyugh Castle
13		Yerazgavors Castle	9th-11th century	Yerazgavors	
14		Kaps Castle	Middle Ages	Kaps	
15		Harich Castle	Middle Ages	Harich	
16		Dzithankov Castle	3rd-5th century	Dzithankov	
17		Dzorakap Castle	Middle Ages	Dzorakap	
18		Ghazanchi Castle	3rd century	Ghazanchi	
19		Tirashen Fortress, Marmashen	10th century	Marmashen	
20		Basen Castle	Middle Ages	Basen	
21		Pemzashen Castle	Middle Ages	Pemzashen	
22		Jradzor Castle	3rd-4th century	Jradzor	
23		Sarnaghbyur Castle	14th century	Sarnaghbyur	
24		Tsak Qar Fortress, Sarakap	3rd-5th century	Sarakap	
25		Vahramaberd Fortress	10th-13th century	Vahramaberd	
26		Pokr Sepasar Castle	17th-18th century	Pokr Sepasar	

== Castles in Syunik Province ==
Castles in the Syunik Province include:

#	Image	Name	Date	Location	Image
1		Kataravank	10th-14th century	Kapan	
2		Kkots Qar	10th century	Kapan	
3	Հալիձորի բերդ Halidzor Fortress	Halidzor Fortress	10th-18th century	Kapan	Հալիձորի բերդ Halidzor Fortress
4		Dzagedzor Fortress	10th-20th century	Goris	
5	Մեղրու բերդ Meghri Fortress	Meghri Fortress	10th-11th century	Meghri	Մեղրու բերդ Meghri Fortress
6		Tsak Qar Fortress	Middle Ages	Sisian	
7		Syuni Fortress	Middle Ages	Sisian	
8		Shlorut Fortress	Middle Ages	Kajaran	
9	Բաղաբերդ Baghaberd	Baghaberd	4th-18th century	Andokavan	Բաղաբերդ Baghaberd
10		Baghaku Qar	4th-18th century	Andokavan	
11		Zevu Berd	10th century	Andokavan	
11		Geghi Fortress	10th century	Geghi	
12		Kard Castle	12th century	Kard	
13		Aghjka Berd, Kndzoresk	Middle Ages	Khndzoresk	
14		Khndzoresk Fortress	1727	Khndzoresk	
15		Aghjka Berd, Tsav	10th-13th century	Tsav	
16		Karchevan Castle	17th-18th century	Karchevan	
17		Vasakaberd	5th century	Hatsavan	
18		Berdin Qar	Middle Ages	Shvanidzor	
19		Kalandar Fortress		Aghbullaz	
20	Որոտնաբերդ Vorotnaberd	Vorotnaberd	5th century	Vaghatin	Որոտնաբերդ Vorotnaberd
21		Tsuraberd	10th-17th century	Svarants	
22		Kaqavaberd, Vahravar	10th-17th century	Vahravar	
23		First castle in Uyts	Middle Ages	Uyts	
24		Second castle in Uyts	Middle Ages	Uyts	

== Castles in Tavush Province ==
Castles in the Tavush Province include:

- Aghjkaghala Castle
- Aghli Berd
- Aghtamir Fortress
- Alberd
- Ardar Davit
- Arin Berd – Also known as Erebuni Fortress.
- Berdakar
- Berdavan Fortress – Most likely built between the 10th and 11th centuries; 17th-century reconstruction with church nearby (Tavush Province, Armenia).
- Berdidash
- Berdi Dosh
- Berdi Glukh
- Dzernak Fortress
- Erebuni Fortress – Also known as Arin Berd and Yerevani Berd; Massive Urartian fortress (Erebuni Masiv, Yervan, Armenia).
- Geghi Berd – Also known as Kakavaberd.
- Ghalinjakar – Commonly known as Berdavan Fortress.
- Ghaluchay Fort
- Ghslakh Fortress
- Heghi Dar
- Hnaberd Fortress
- Horom Citadel – Ancient Bronze Age through Urartian fortification (Shirak Province, Armenia).
- Hraskaberd
- Ishkanaberd – Formerly Teyseba, now commonly known as Odzaberd.
- Ishkanats Amrots
- Kaftarli Fort
- Kapuyt Berd
- Karmir Berd – Fortified settlement from the end of the 2nd millennium BC, located along the right bank of the Hrazdan River (Yerevan, Armenia).
- Khoshap
- Lori Berd
- Matsnaberd
- Metsep Fortress
- Mrtbi Dzor
- Okon Castle
- Solyani Fort
- Tavush Fortress
- Teishebaini – The site of a Urartian city located within modern Yerevan.
- Tevrakar Castle
- Tsamakaberd Fortress
- Tsitsernakaberd – Once an Iron Age fortress, now the modern Armenian Genocide Memorial (Yerevan, Armenia).
- Vanki Amrots
- Yerevani Berd – Commonly known as Erebuni Fortress.
- Yergevanits Fortress
- Yervandakert Fortress
- Zeva Fortress
- Zhami Dar

== Castles in Vayots Dzor Province ==
Castles in the Vayots Dzor Province include:

#	Image	Name	Date	Location	Image
1		Qyoshk Fortress	17th century	Yeghegnadzor	
2		Agarakadzor Castle	9th century	Agarakadzor	
3		Azatek Castle	19th century	Azatek	
4		Aghnjadzor Castle	4th-14th century	Aghnjadzor	
5	Սմբատաբերդ Smbataberd	Smbataberd	10th-14th century	Artabuynk	Սմբատաբերդ Smbataberd
6	Ամրոց "Էրթիչ" Ertij Fort	Ertij Fort	12th-14th century	Arpi	Ամրոց "Էրթիչ" Ertij Fort
7	Պռոշաբերդ Proshaberd	Proshaberd	13th-14th century	Gladzor	Պռոշաբերդ Proshaberd
8		Berdi Glukh, Gndevaz	Middle Ages	Gndevaz	
9		Pshonq Fortress	17th-18th century	Zaritap	
10		Kapuyt Fortress, Herher	10th-14th century	Herher	
11		Berdakar Castle, Shatin	13th-14th century	Shatin	

== See also ==
- Armenian Palaces
- List of caravanserais in Armenia
- List of castles
- List of castles in the Republic of Artsakh
- List of monasteries in Armenia
