= Chatkran =

Chatkran may refer to:

- Geghashen, Armenia
- Nor Geghi, Armenia
