= Shgharshik, Aragatsotn =

Shgharshik Շղարշիկ
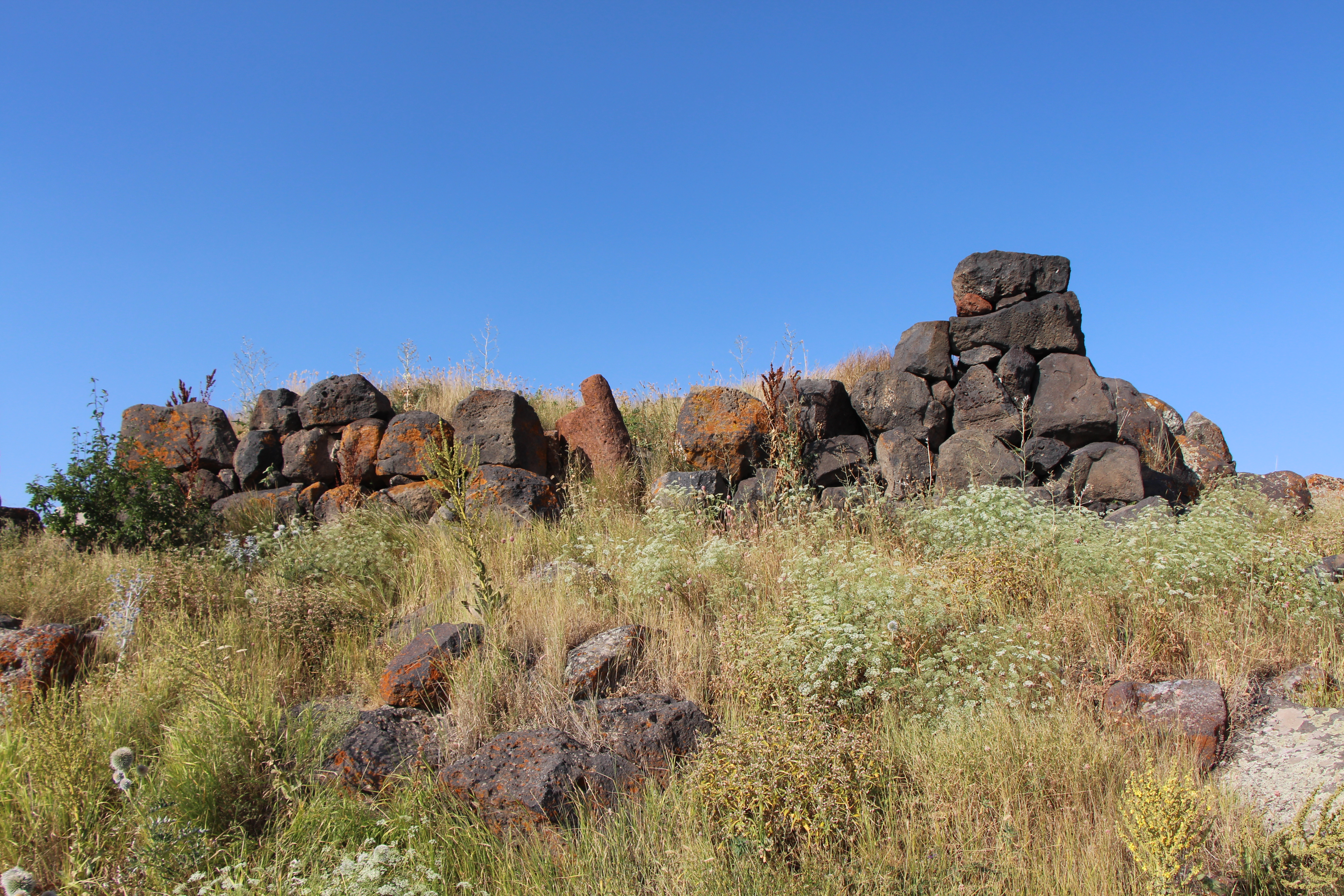
- Շղարշիկ ԱՄՐՈՑ «ՂԱԼԱՉԻ

- Location within Armenia Location within Aragatsotn
- Coordinates: 40°25′N 43°58′E
- Country: Armenia
- Province: Aragatsotn
- Municipality: Talin

Area
  - Total: 10.9 km^{2} (4.2 sq mi)

Population (2011)
  - Total: 473
  - Density: 52/km^{2} (130/sq mi)
- Time zone: UTC+4
  - Summer (DST): UTC+5

Shgharshik (Armenian: Շղարշիկ) is a village in the Talin Municipality of the Aragatsotn Province of Armenia. There is a memorial in the city remembering the Armenian genocide of 1915.
