= Antarut =

Antarut Անտառուտ
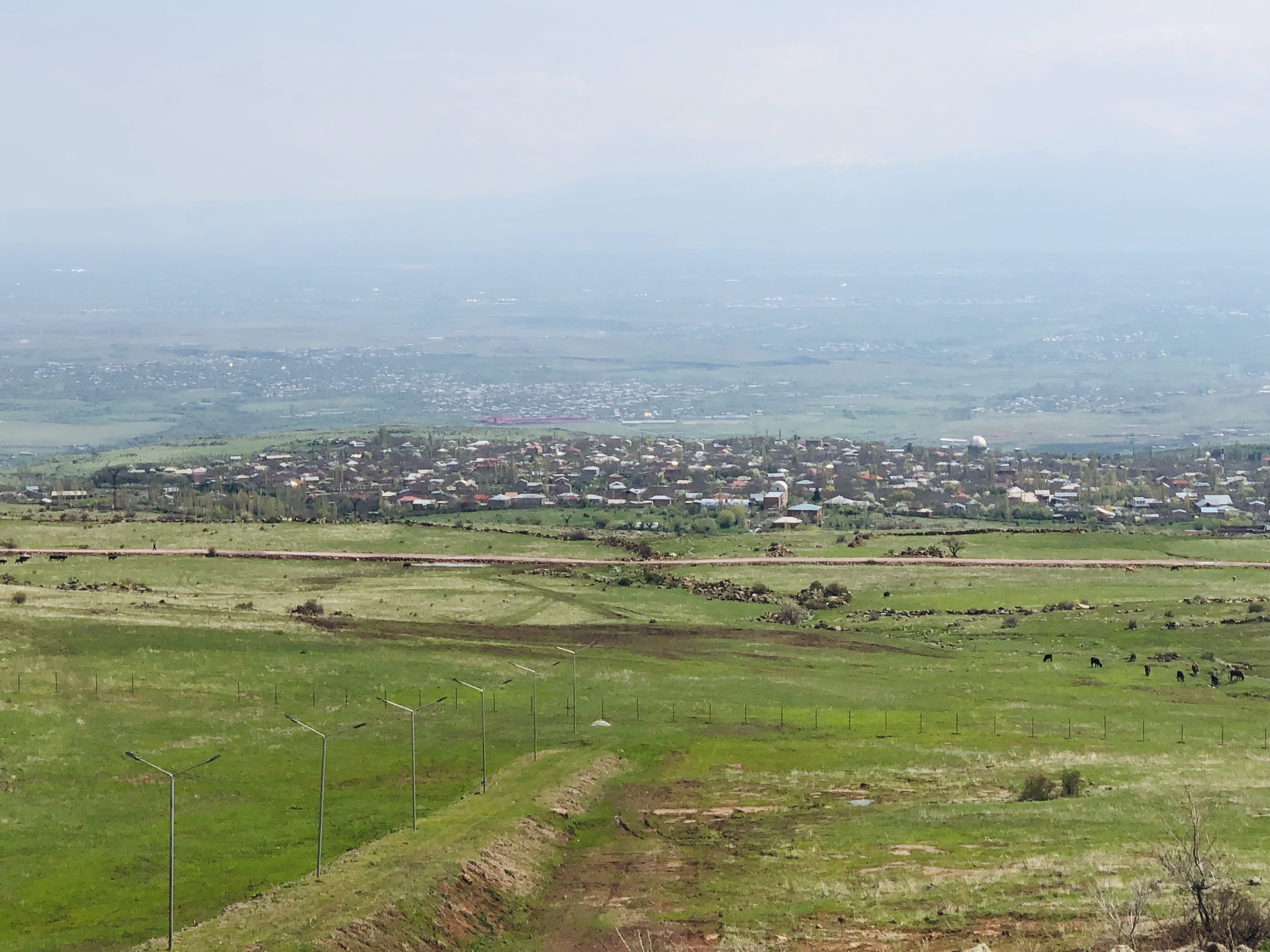

- Location within Armenia Location within Aragatsotn
- Coordinates: 40°21′N 44°16′E
- Country: Armenia
- Province: Aragatsotn
- Municipality: Ashtarak

Population (2011)
  - Total: 357
- Time zone: UTC+4
  - Summer (DST): UTC+5

Antarut (Armenian: Անտառուտ) is a village in the Ashtarak Municipality of the Aragatsotn Province of Armenia.
