= Gusanagyugh =

Village in Shirak, Armenia

Gusanagyugh Գուսանագյուղ
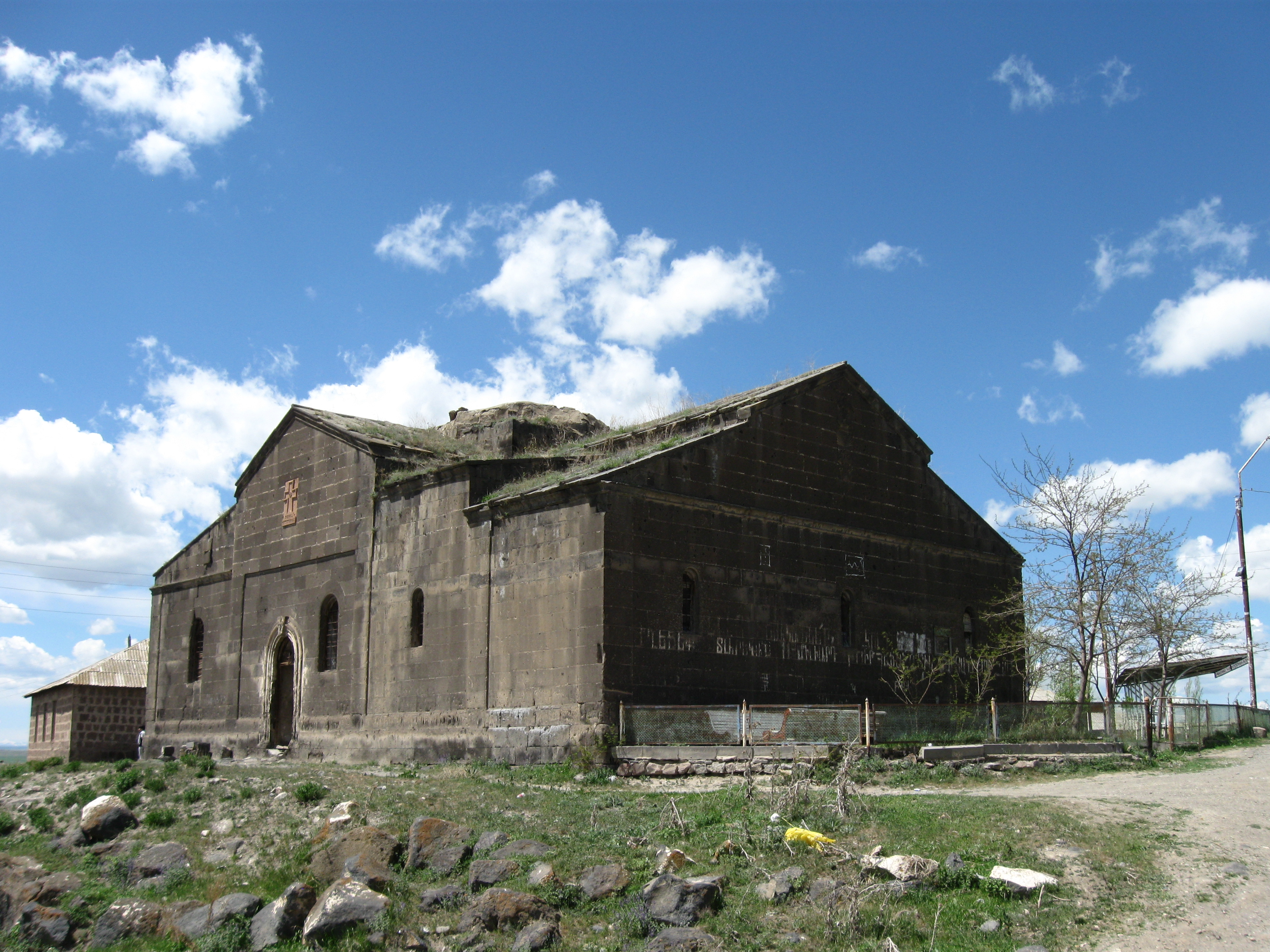

- Location within Armenia Location within Shirak
- Coordinates: 40°40′09″N 43°47′18″E
- Country: Armenia
- Province: Shirak
- Municipality: Ani
- Elevation: 1,540 m (5,050 ft)

Population (2011)
  - Total: 937
- Time zone: UTC+4

Gusanagyugh (Armenian: Գուսանագյուղ) is a village in the Ani Municipality of the Shirak Province of Armenia. In 1977, it was renamed after the bard "Gusan" Nakhshikar Sargis.

== Development programs ==
Gusanagyush village became part of COAF-supported villages (Children of Armenia Fund).

The programs implemented include: Student Councils, Debate Clubs, Health and Lifestyle Education, School Nutrition & Brushodromes, Women Health Screenings, Support for Reproductive Health.

Children of Armenia Fund also renovated village facilities such as cafeteria and Brushodrome.

== Demographics ==
Historical population
Year	Pop.	±% p.a.
1831	138	—
1897	1,466	+3.65%
1926	1,062	−1.11%
1939	1,433	+2.33%
1959	1,207	−0.85%
1970	978	−1.89%
1979	876	−1.22%
2001	898	+0.11%
2011	937	+0.43%
