= Arpeni =

Village in Shirak, Armenia

Arpeni Արփենի
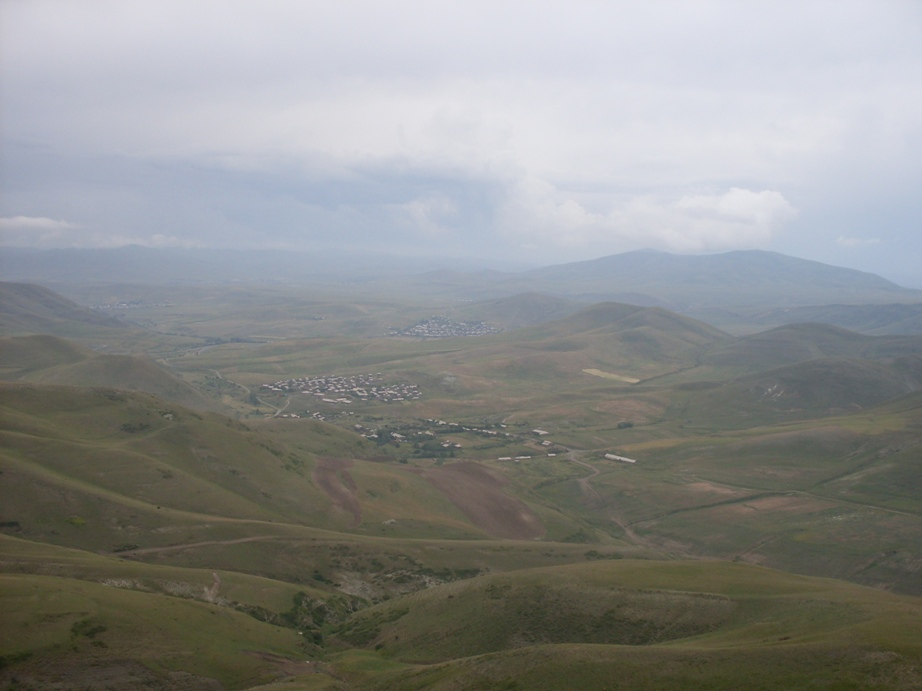
- The village of Arpeni.

- Location within Armenia Location within Shirak
- Coordinates: 40°55′N 43°53′E
- Country: Armenia
- Province: Shirak
- Municipality: Ashotsk
- Elevation: 1,920 m (6,300 ft)

Population (2011)
  - Total: 276
- Time zone: UTC+4

Arpeni (Armenian: Արփենի) is a village in the Ashotsk Municipality of the Shirak Province of Armenia. Within the village is a 19th-century church. The Statistical Committee of Armenia reported its population was 397 in 2010, up from 373 at the 2001 census.

== Demographics ==
Historical population
Year	Pop.	±% p.a.
1897	598	—
1926	479	−0.76%
1970	404	−0.39%
1980	369	−0.90%
2001	373	+0.05%
2011	276	−2.97%

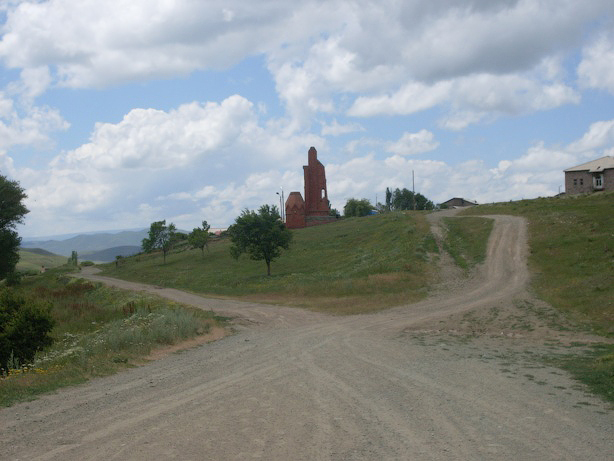

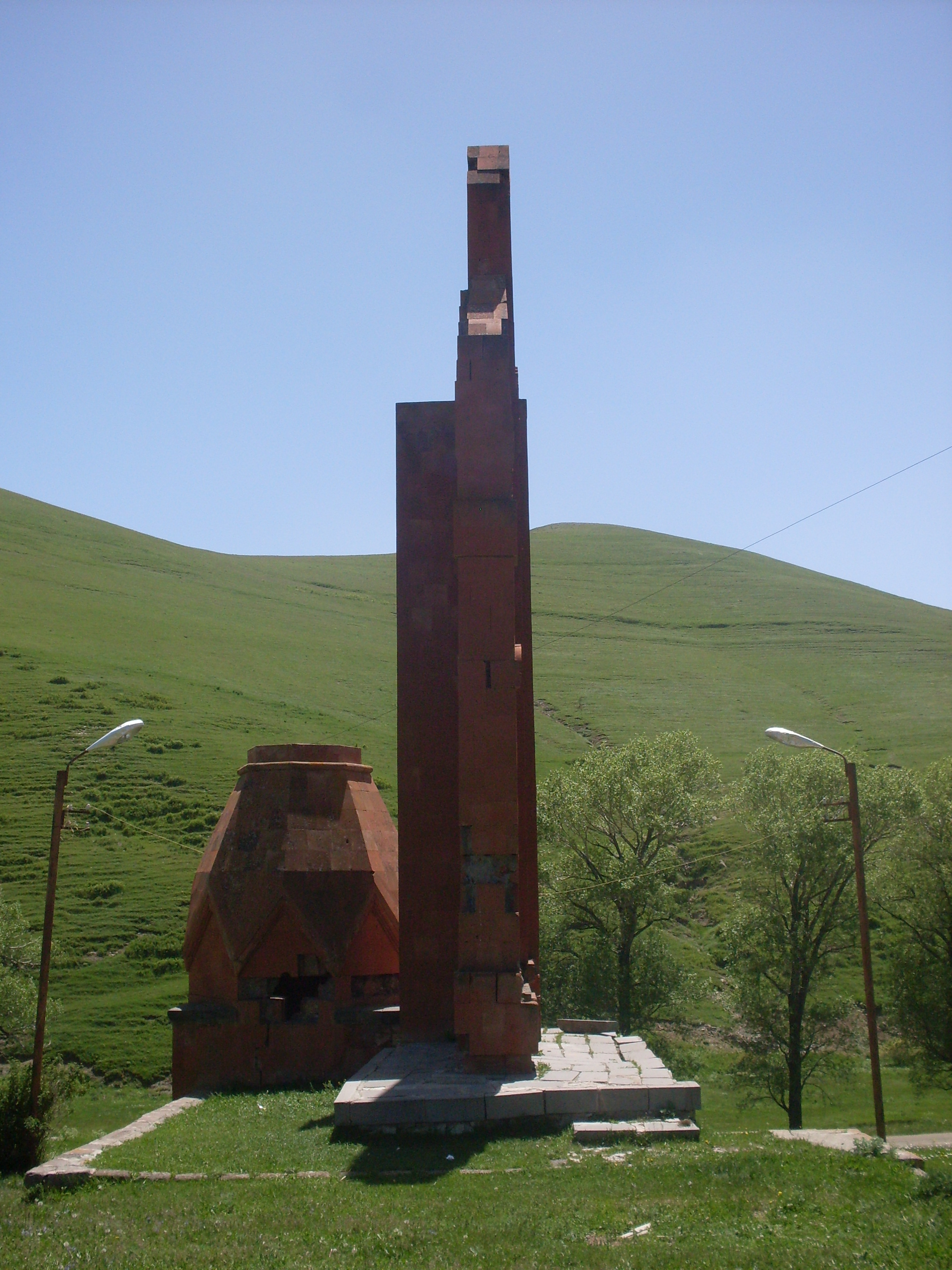

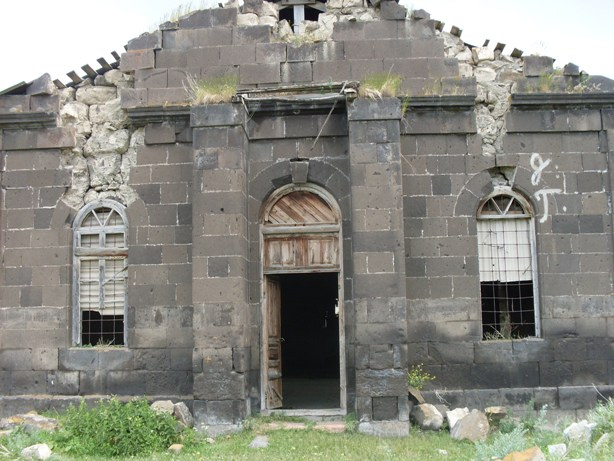

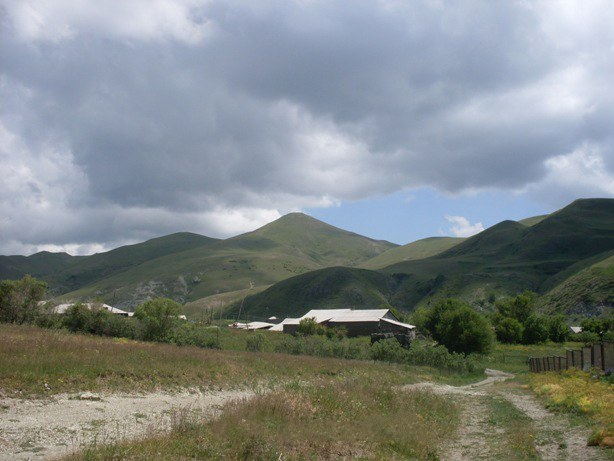

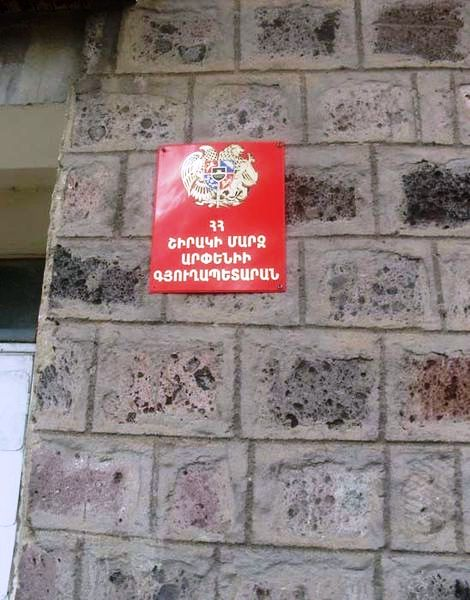

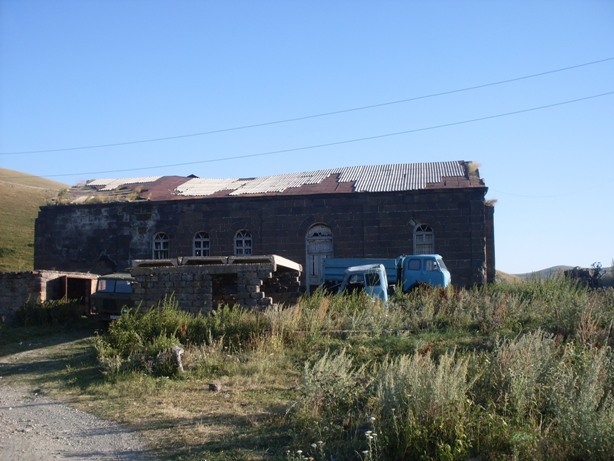

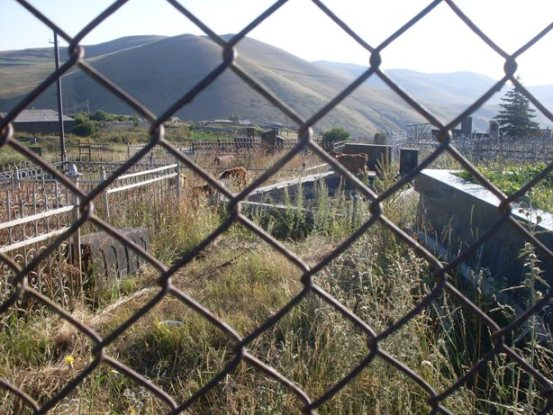

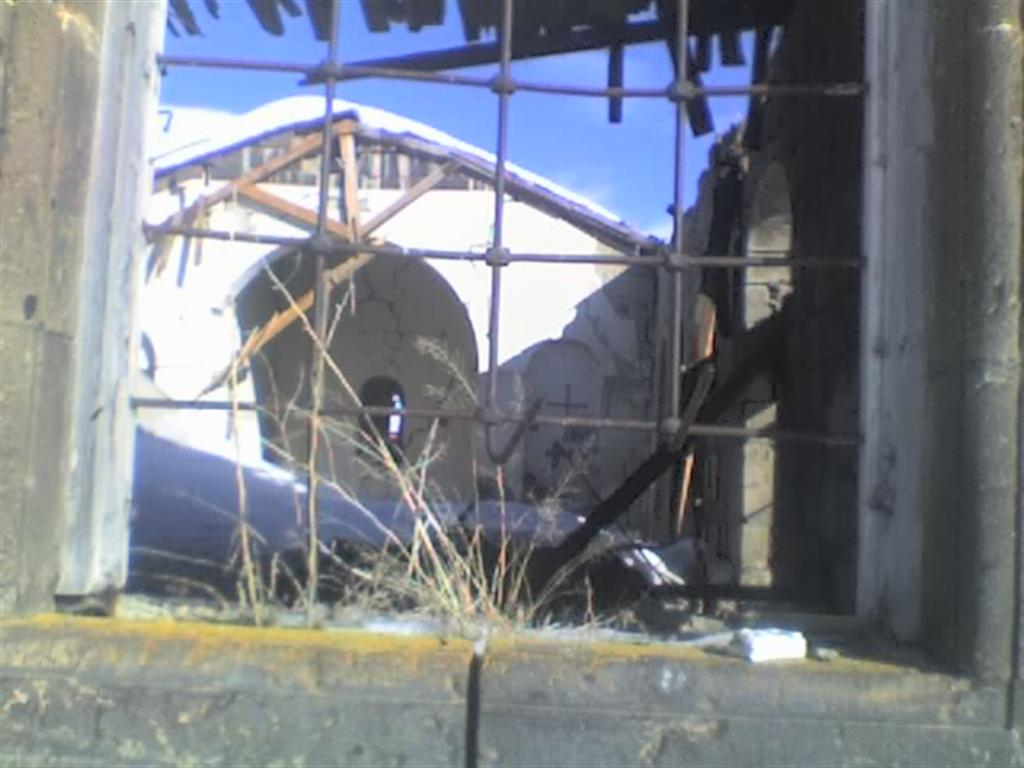
