= Kaps =

Village in Shirak, Armenia

Kaps Կապս
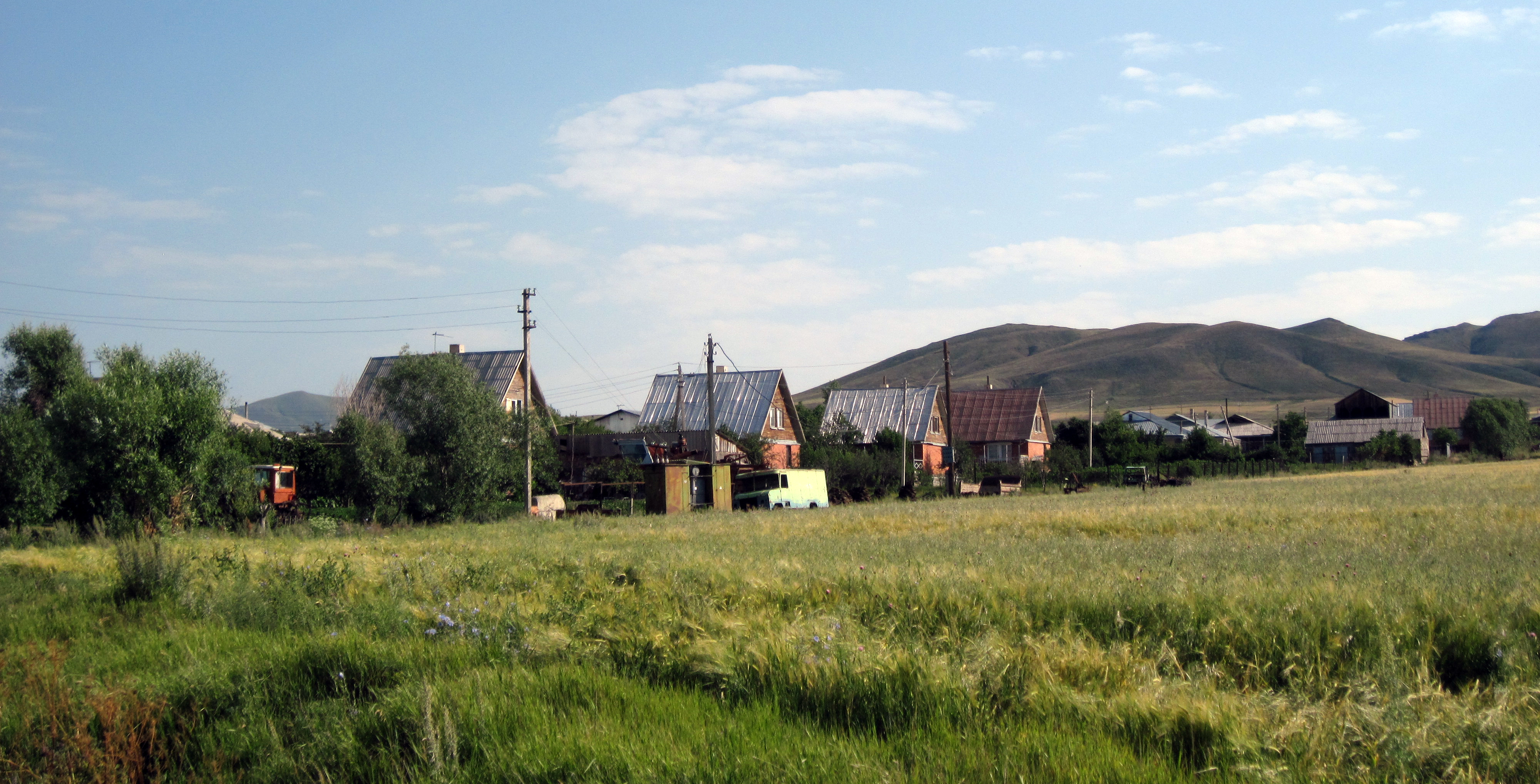
- Kaps

- Location within Armenia Location within Shirak
- Coordinates: 40°52′N 43°43′E
- Country: Armenia
- Province: Shirak
- Municipality: Akhuryan

Population (2011)
  - Total: 834
- Time zone: UTC+4
  - Summer (DST): UTC+5

Kaps (Armenian: Կապս) is a village in the Akhuryan Municipality of the Shirak Province of Armenia. There were 1088 inhabitants in 2008.

== Demographics ==
Historical population
Year	Pop.	±% p.a.
1831	166	—
1897	457	+1.55%
1926	449	−0.06%
1939	542	+1.46%
1959	428	−1.17%
1970	539	+2.12%
1979	535	−0.08%
2001	720	+1.36%
2011	834	+1.48%
