= Norashen, Gegharkunik =

Village in Gegharkunik, Armenia

Norashen Նորաշեն
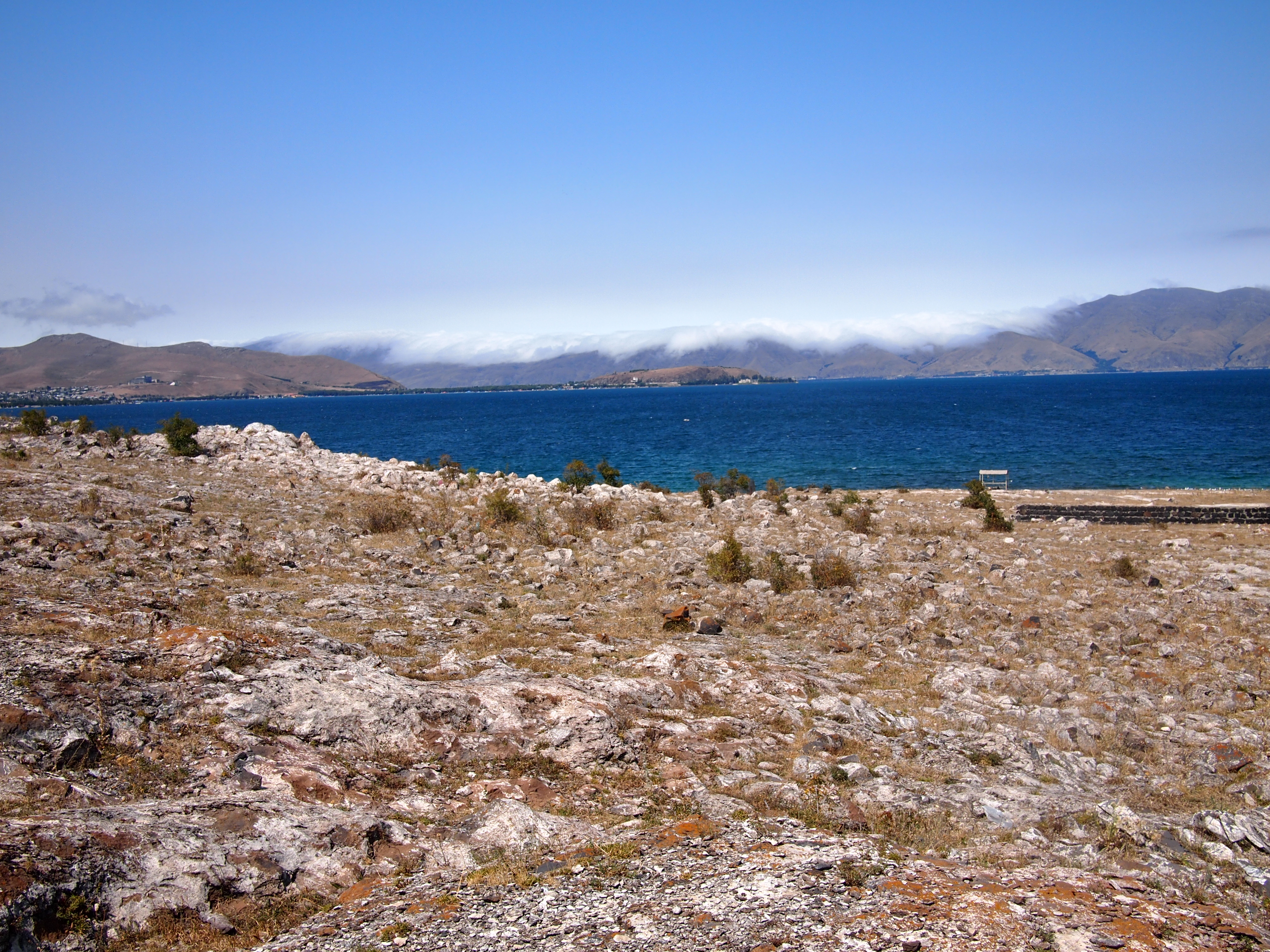
- Scenery around Norashen

- Location within Armenia Location within Gegharkunik
- Coordinates: 40°30′16″N 45°01′22″E
- Country: Armenia
- Province: Gegharkunik
- Municipality: Sevan
- Founded: 1920

Population (2011)
  - Total: 475
- Time zone: UTC+4 (AMT)

Norashen (Armenian: Նորաշեն) is a village in the Sevan Municipality of the Gegharkunik Province of Armenia. The village has a church and a cemetery.

== Etymology ==
The village was previously known as Efendi.

== History ==
The town was founded in 1920 on the site of the former village of Rahmankendi.

== Gallery ==
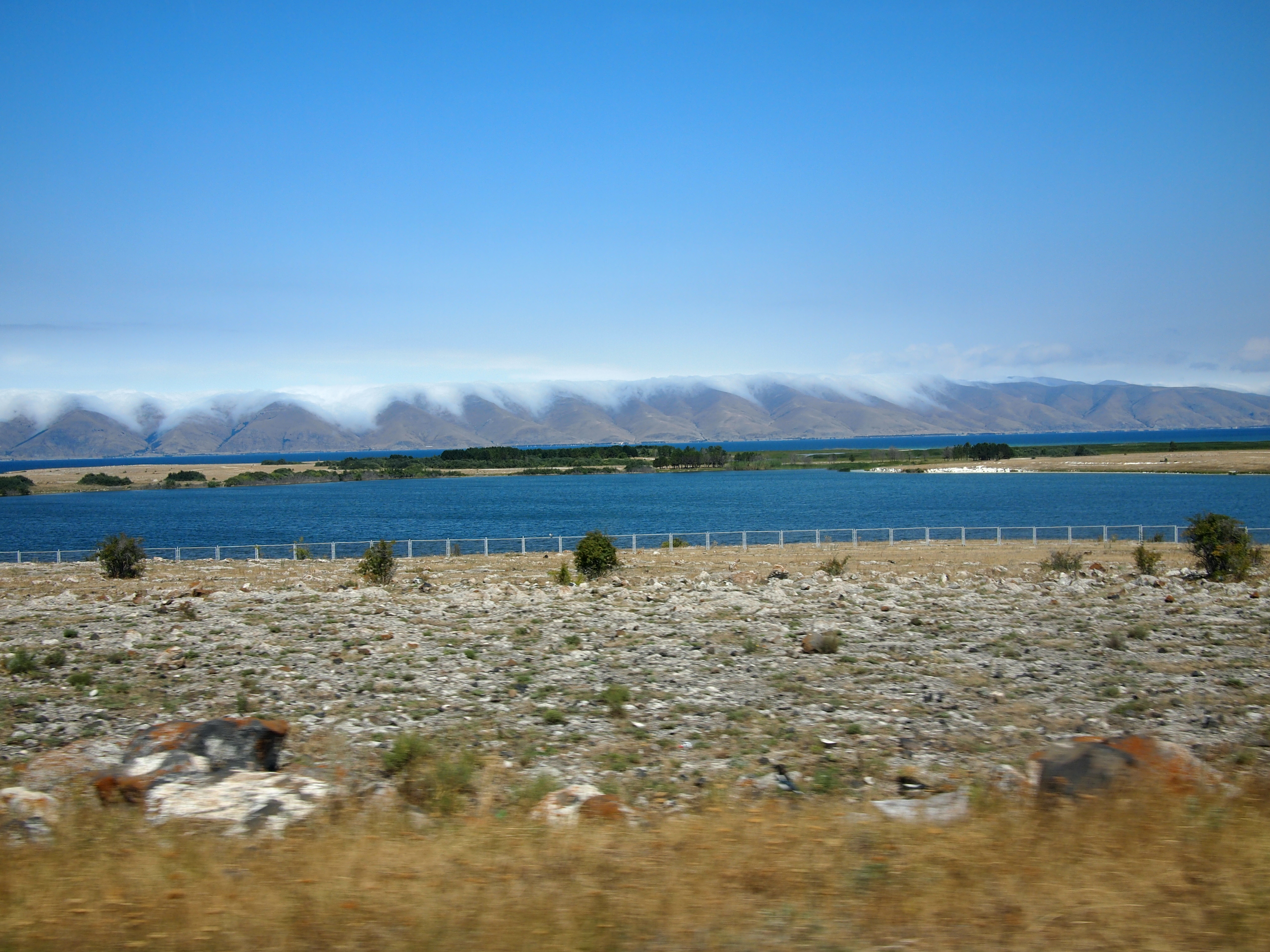
Scenery around Norashen
