= Dzoraglukh =

Dzoraglukh Ձորագլուխ
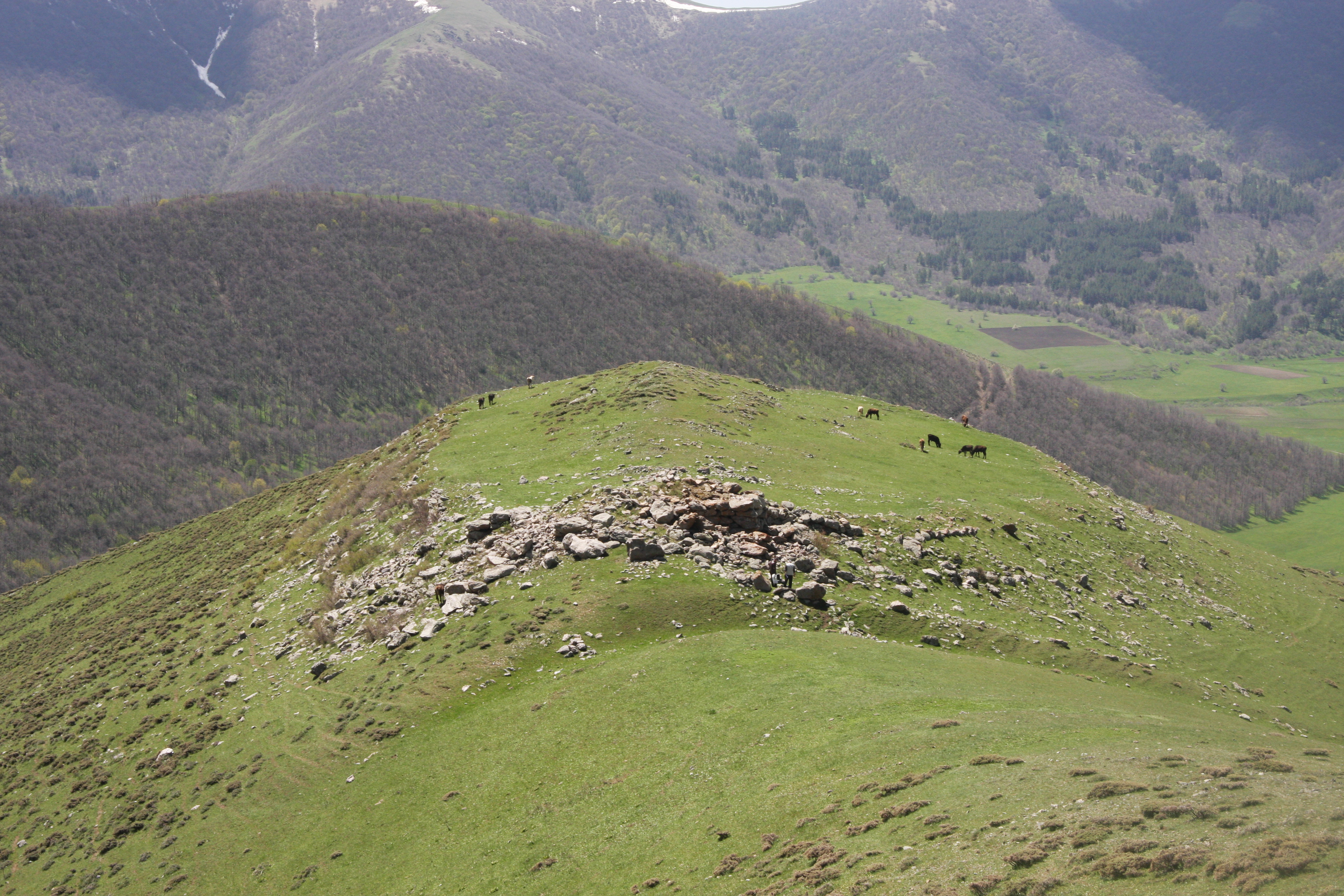
- Berdi glukh castle

- Location within Armenia Location within Aragatsotn
- Coordinates: 40°34′49″N 44°29′07″E
- Country: Armenia
- Province: Aragatsotn
- Municipality: Aparan

Population (2011)
  - Total: 305
- Time zone: UTC+4
  - Summer (DST): UTC+5

Dzoraglukh (Armenian: Ձորագլուխ) is a village in the Aparan Municipality of the Aragatsotn Province of Armenia. The town's church, dedicated to Saint Hovhannes (Saint John), dates from the 10th to the 12th century.
