= Vahagnadzor =

Village in Lori, Armenia

Vahagnadzor Վահագնաձոր
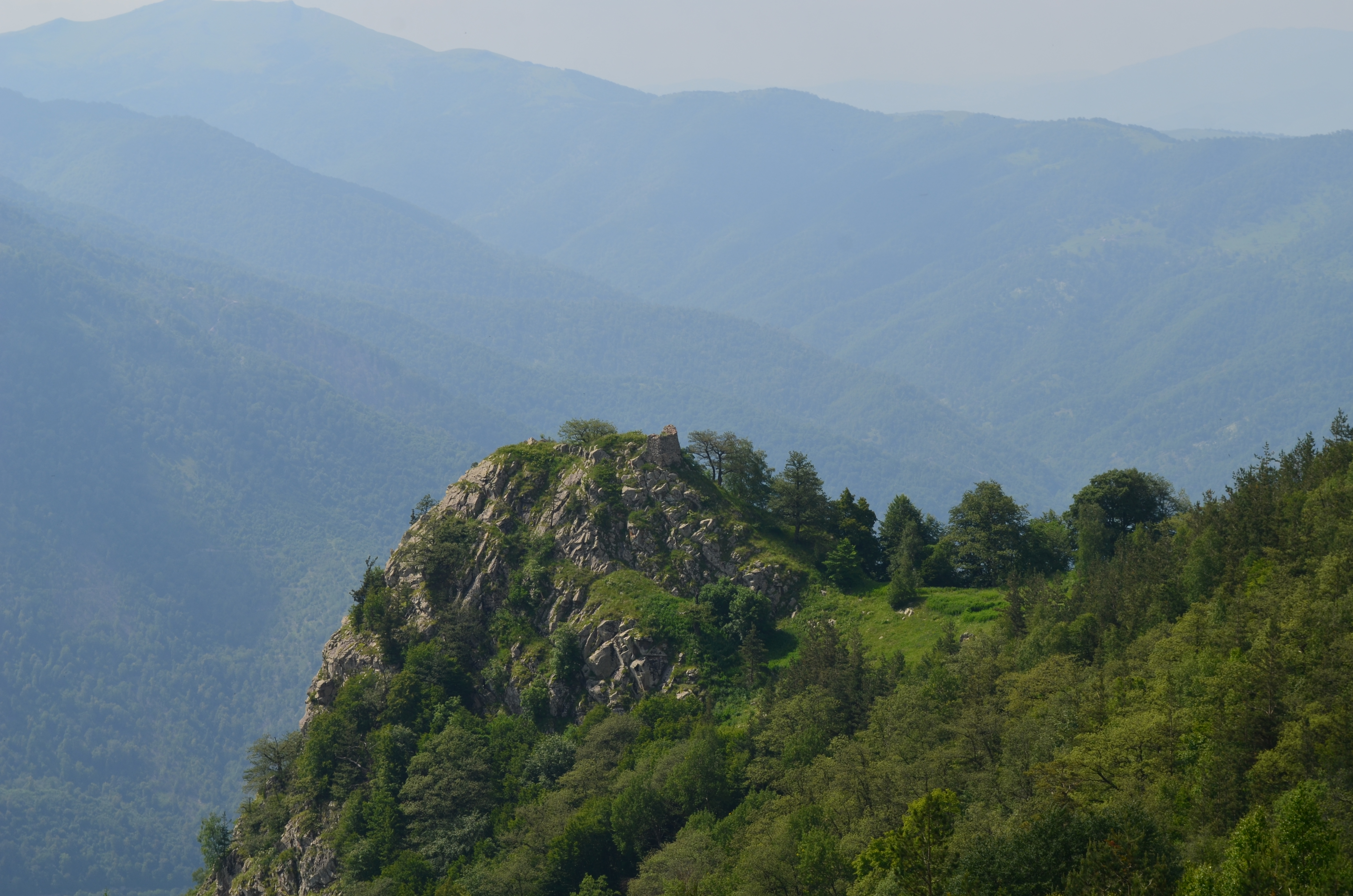

- Location within Armenia
- Coordinates: 40°53′7″N 44°35′36″E
- Country: Armenia
- Marz (Province): Lori Province
- Elevation: 1,040 m (3,410 ft)

Population (2011)
  - Total: 300
- Time zone: UTC+4 ( )
  - Summer (DST): UTC+5 ( )

Vahagnadzor (Armenian: Վահագնաձոր) is a town in the Lori Province of Armenia. The town has a ruined fortress.
