= Shnogh =

Shnogh Շնող
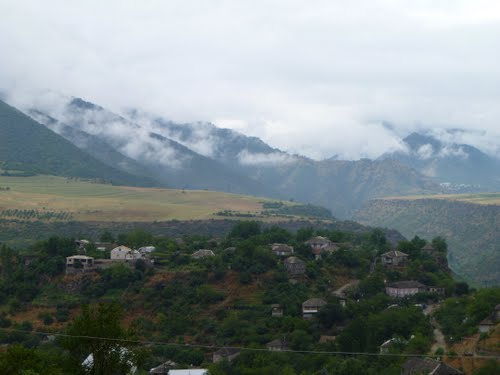

- Location within Armenia
- Coordinates: 41°08′52″N 44°50′16″E
- Country: Armenia
- Province: Lori

Government
- Elevation: 725 m (2,379 ft)

Population (2011)
  - Total: 2,561

Shnogh (Armenian: Շնող, also Romanized as Shnokh;) is a town in the Lori Province of Armenia. Shnogh is a village in the region of Lori in Armenia at 41°9'0" north of the equator and 44°50'24" east of the Greenwich Prime Meridian. The population is approximately 3250 (870 families; 1996).
Shnogh is an expansive settlement whose name derives from Armenian roots meaning "abundant soil," reflecting its rich agricultural potential. It stands as one of the oldest and most historically prosperous communities in the region.

The village infrastructure includes primary and art schools, a cultural house, a library, a cinema, a kindergarten, a medical clinic, pharmacies, and a local history museum. Shnogh is in the east part of mountain area named Gugarq, at the right site slope of river Debed, in a very complex geographical relief (which makes very beautiful and unusual view of village).

The region features a mild climate bordering on dry subtropical, with an annual mean temperature of 11.1°C, a record maximum of 38°C, and a record minimum of −22°C. The surrounding mountains contain diverse mineral deposits—including copper, molybdenum, and iron—which have been mined since ancient times. The local forests are dense and rich in valuable timber, native grasses, wild berries, and fruits, supporting an agricultural tradition that dates back to antiquity.

== History ==
The history of Shnogh is closely related to the fortress named Kaitsoon (10th-11th centuries). The name change Kaitsoon-Shnogh was made in later times (19th century). Shnogh has shared the difficult and dramatic history of Armenia. In the 10th and 11th centuries in this area were under the rule of the Kyurikian princes; in 1118, Kaitsoon was attached to Georgia by David Builder King of Georgia. In 13th-15th centuries, the fortress was under Zakarian princes (Armenian), since the 13th century it was attacked many times by Seljuk-Turks and Mongol-Tatars. Since the 17th century, the Persian King Abas has continually removed the Armenian and Georgian natives from this area and sending there Turk nomads. The area was attacked many times further. In 1919, Lori region was declared as neutral zone to protect area from Turkey. In the end of 1920 to prevent the progress of Turkish army, Georgia sent his armies to Lori and declared army regime in region. After ending the Armenian-Turkish war, however, Georgia claimed the region and did not remove its armies from Lori. In November 1920, the natives with the help of the army removed Georgian forces from the Lori region when Armenia entered the Soviet Union.

After the Armenian declaration of independence on September 21, 1991, the village entered the new times with many economical problems and continues to recover its welfare.
