= Chknagh =

Chknagh Չքնաղ
- Location within Armenia Location within Aragatsotn
- Coordinates: 40°35′03″N 44°26′02″E
- Country: Armenia
- Province: Aragatsotn
- Municipality: Aparan

Population (2011)
  - Total: 239
- Time zone: UTC+4
  - Summer (DST): UTC+5

Structure in Chknagh

Chknagh (Armenian: Չքնաղ) is a village in the Aparan Municipality of the Aragatsotn Province of Armenia.
