= Novoseltsovo =

Novoseltsovo Նովոսելցովո
- Location within Armenia
- Coordinates: 41°04′N 44°16′E
- Country: Armenia
- Marz (Province): Lori Province
- Elevation: 1,475 m (4,839 ft)

Population (2011)
  - Total: 152
- Time zone: UTC+4 ( )
  - Summer (DST): UTC+5

Novoseltsovo (Armenian: Նովոսելցովո) is a village in the Lori Province of Armenia.
