= Gegharot =

Gegharot Գեղարոտ
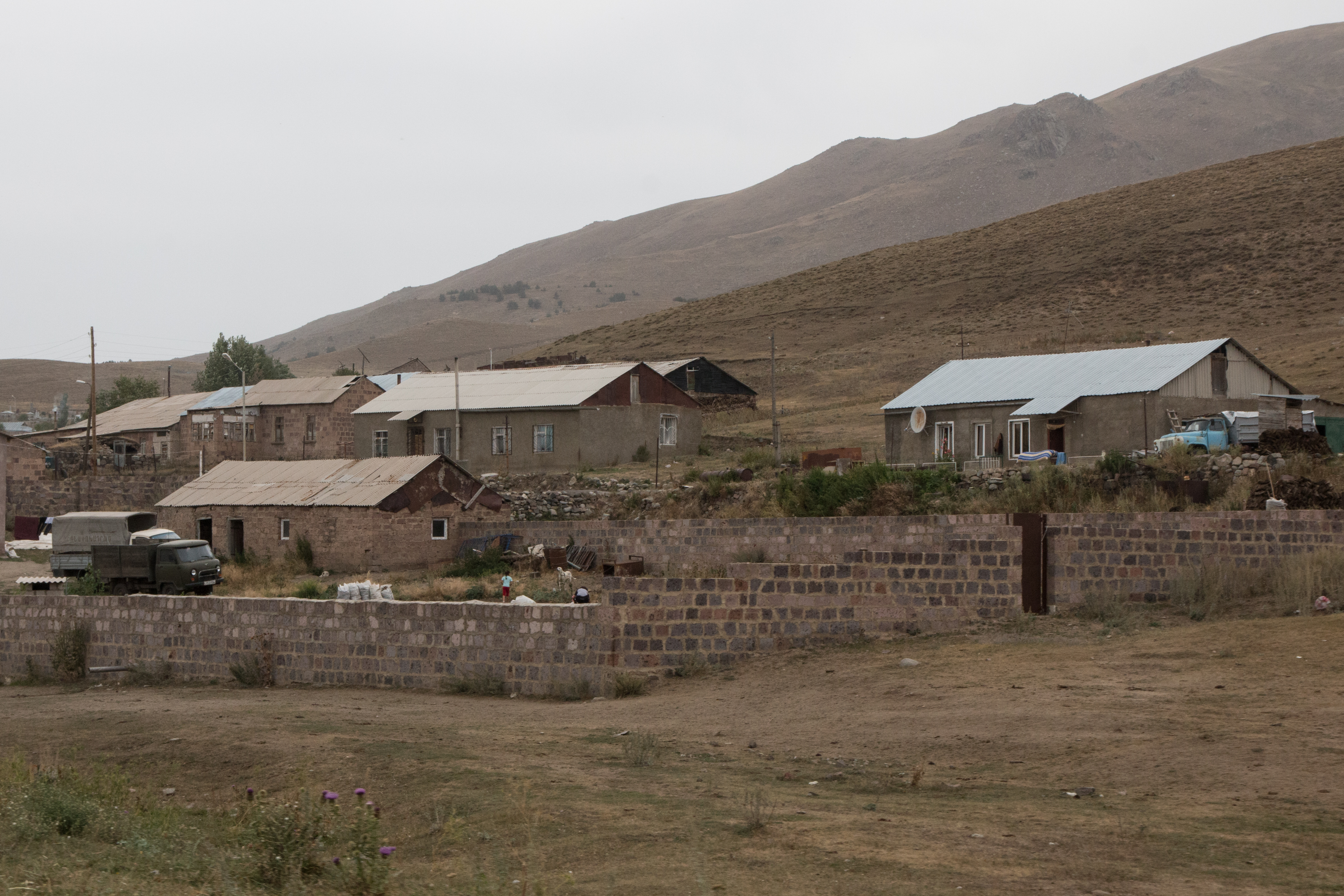

- Location within Armenia Location within Aragatsotn
- Coordinates: 40°42′21″N 44°13′10″E
- Country: Armenia
- Province: Aragatsotn
- Municipality: Tsaghkahovit

Population (2019)
  - Total: 150
- Time zone: UTC+4
  - Summer (DST): UTC+5

Gegharot (Armenian: Գեղարոտ) is a village in the Tsaghkahovit Municipality of the Aragatsotn Province of Armenia.
