= Vaghashen =

Village in Gegharkunik, Armenia

Vaghashen Վաղաշեն
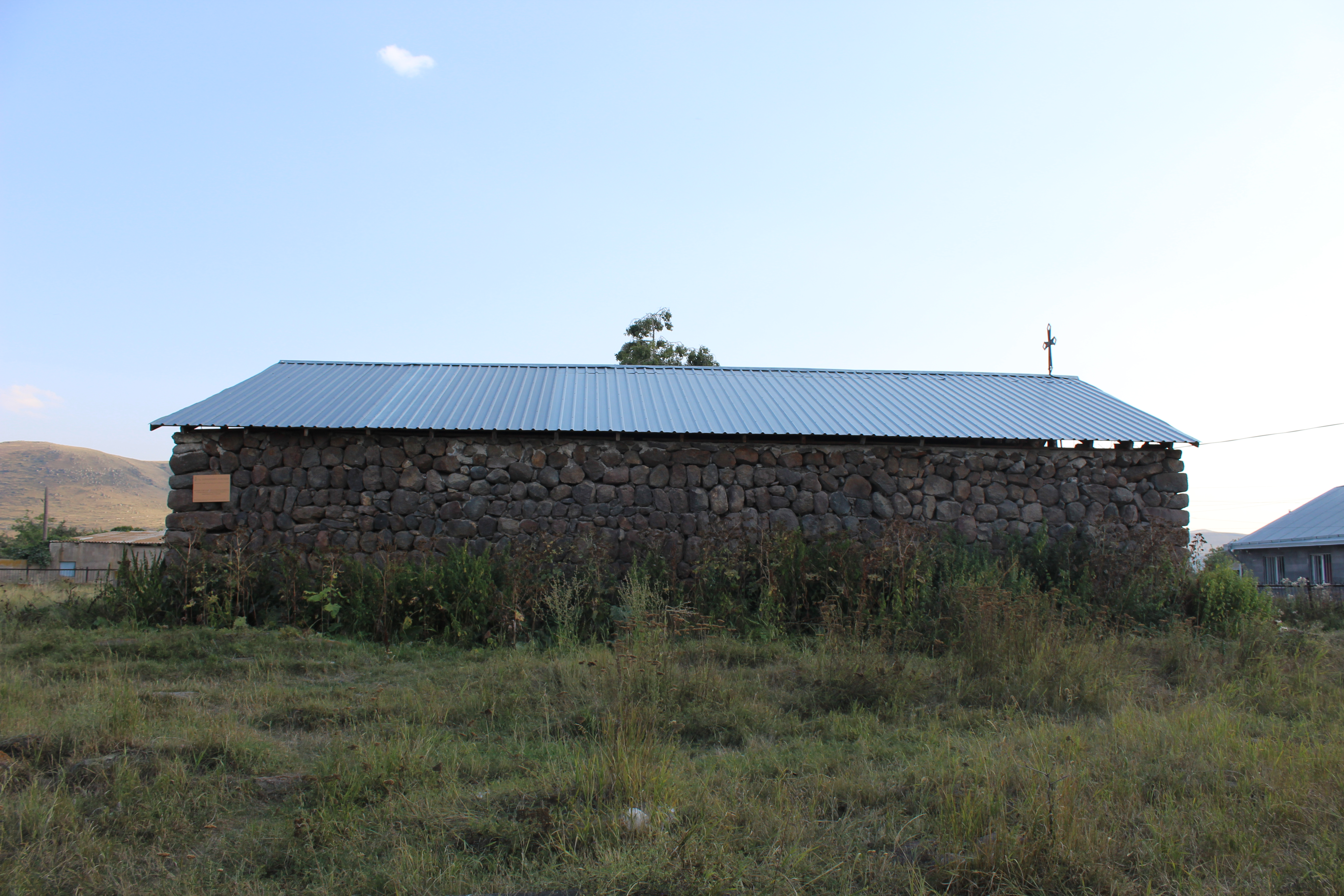
- St. Astvatsatsin Church in Vaghashen

- Location within Armenia Location within Gegharkunik
- Coordinates: 40°08′06″N 45°19′44″E
- Country: Armenia
- Province: Gegharkunik
- Municipality: Martuni
- Established: 1828
- Elevation: 1,956 m (6,417 ft)

Population (2011)
  - Total: 4,267
- Time zone: UTC+4 (AMT)
- Postal code: 1416

Vaghashen (Armenian: Վաղաշեն) is a village in the Martuni Municipality of the Gegharkunik Province of Armenia.

== Toponymy ==
The village was known as Avdalagalu or Abdalaghalu until 1935.

== History ==
There are two 16th-century churches in the village, and nearby are the ruins of Kyurdi Kogh and Aloyi Kogh cyclopean forts.

== Gallery ==
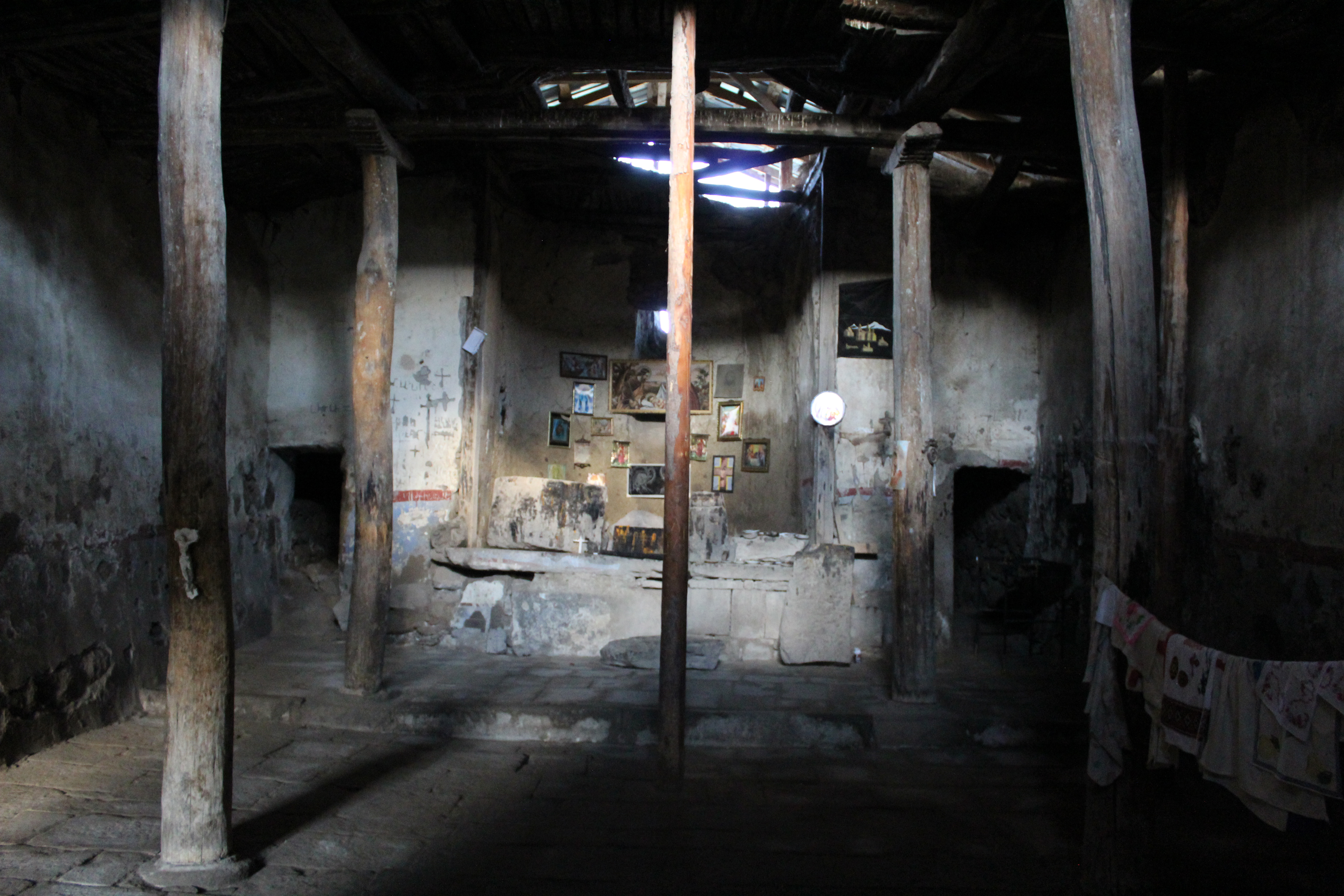
St. Astvatsatsin Church interior

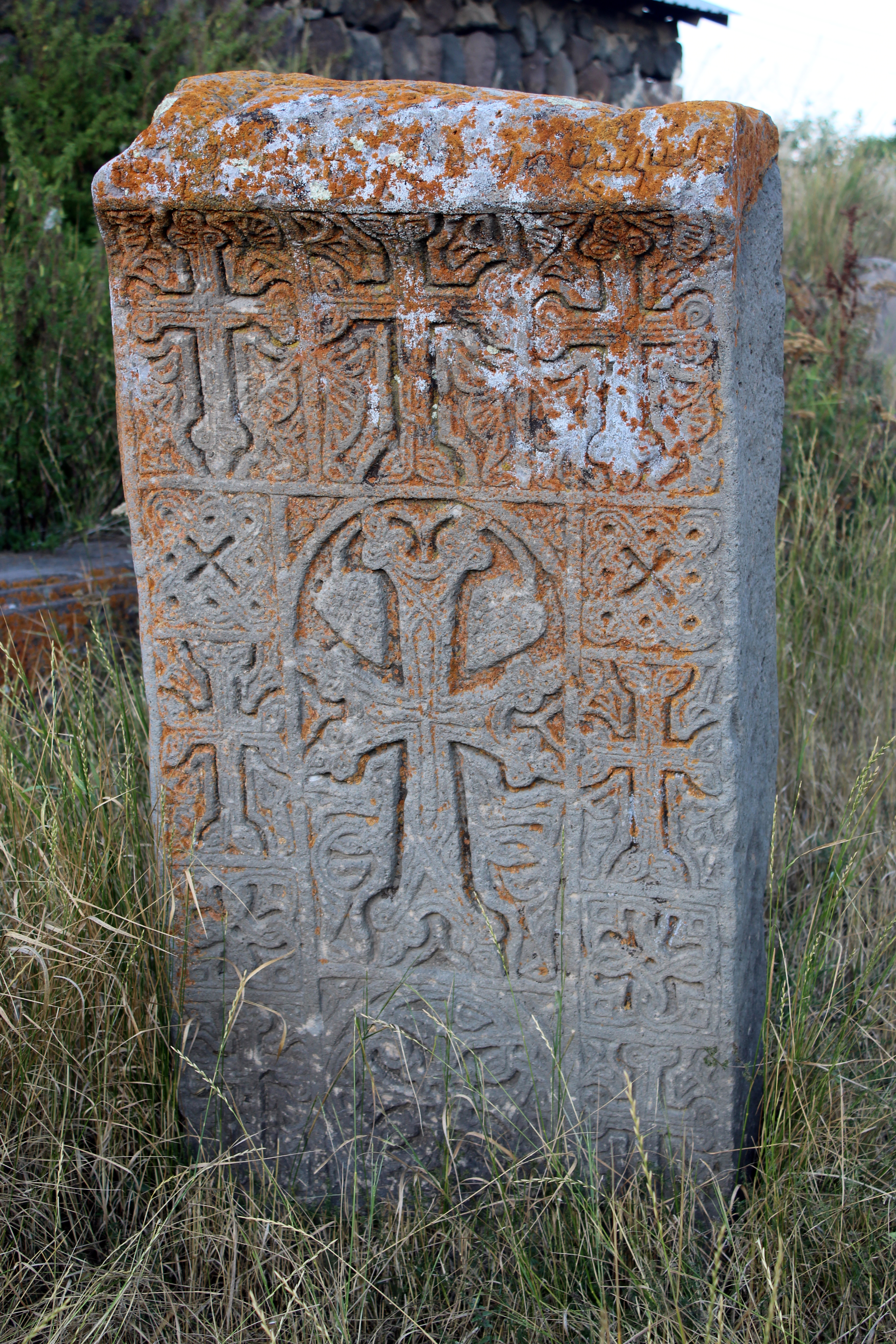
Khachkar in Vaghashen
