= Aghavnatun =

Village in Armavir, Armenia

Aghavnatun Աղավնատուն
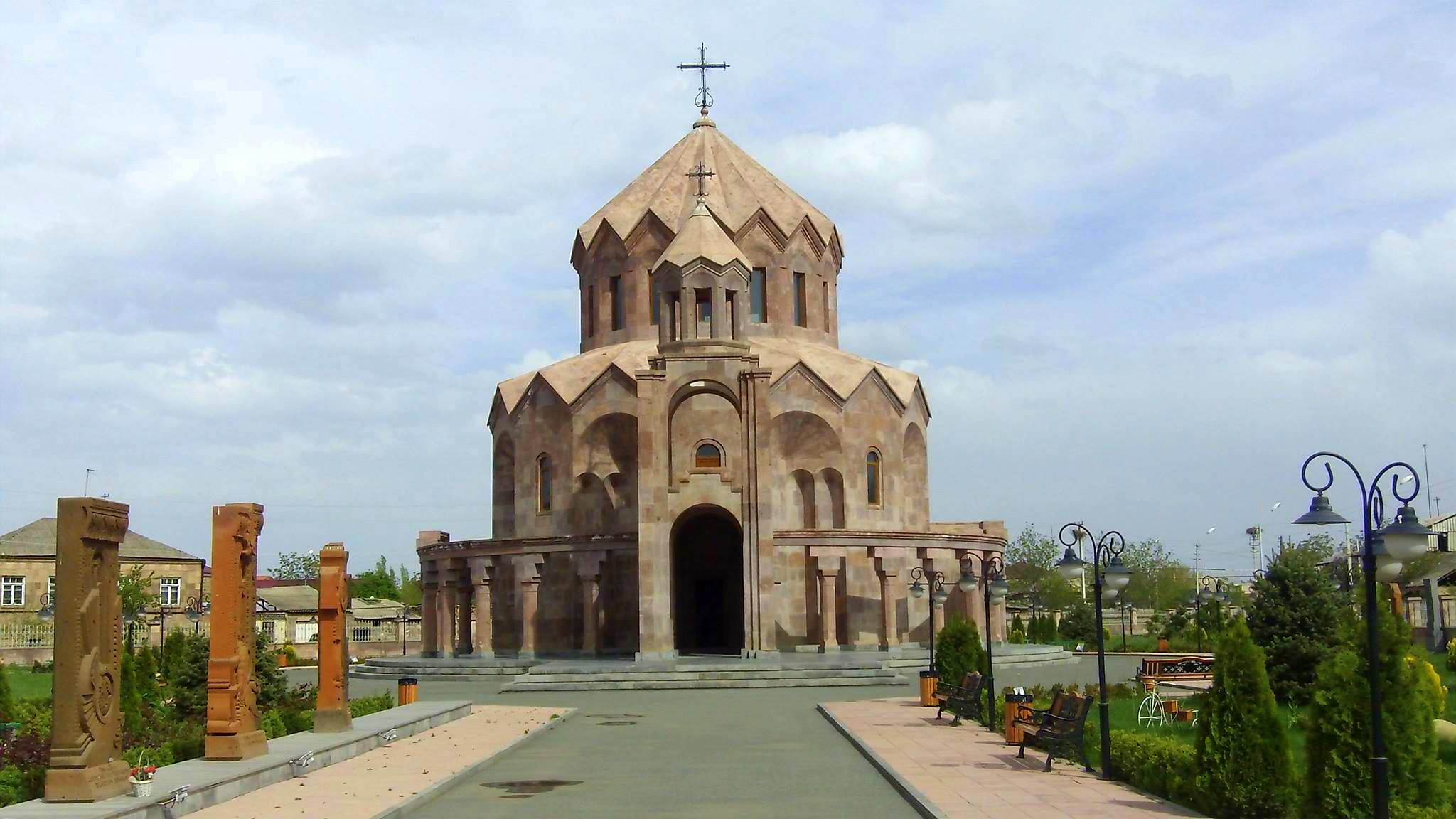
- St. Anna Church in Aghavnatun

- Location within Armenia
- Coordinates: 40°14′00″N 44°15′05″E
- Country: Armenia
- Province: Armavir

Area
  - Total: 11.46 km^{2} (4.42 sq mi)
- Elevation: 925 m (3,035 ft)

Population (2011)
  - Total: 2,840
  - Density: 248/km^{2} (642/sq mi)
- Time zone: UTC+4 ( )
  - Summer (DST): UTC+5 ( )

Aghavnatun (Armenian: Աղավնատուն, formerly, Akhavnatukh) is a village in the Armavir Province of Armenia. it is home to ruins of an iron-age fortress, a 13th-century tomb and a chapel.

There are four churches in the village, the oldest of which is Surp Gevork Church of the 10th century. A circular tower of an unknown purpose is found on a hill top near the village.

== Gallery ==
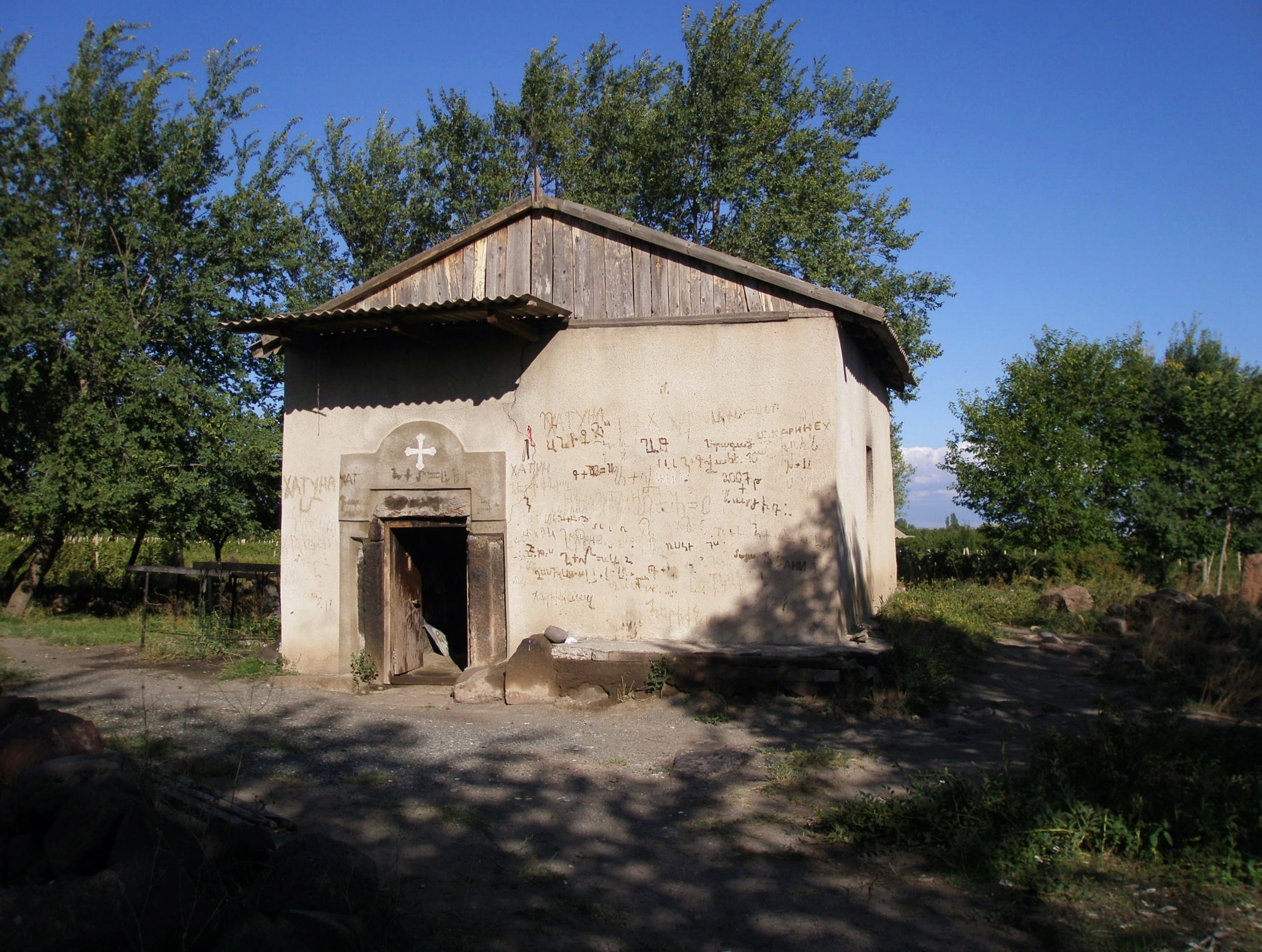
The small church of Karmravor hidden amongst the woods

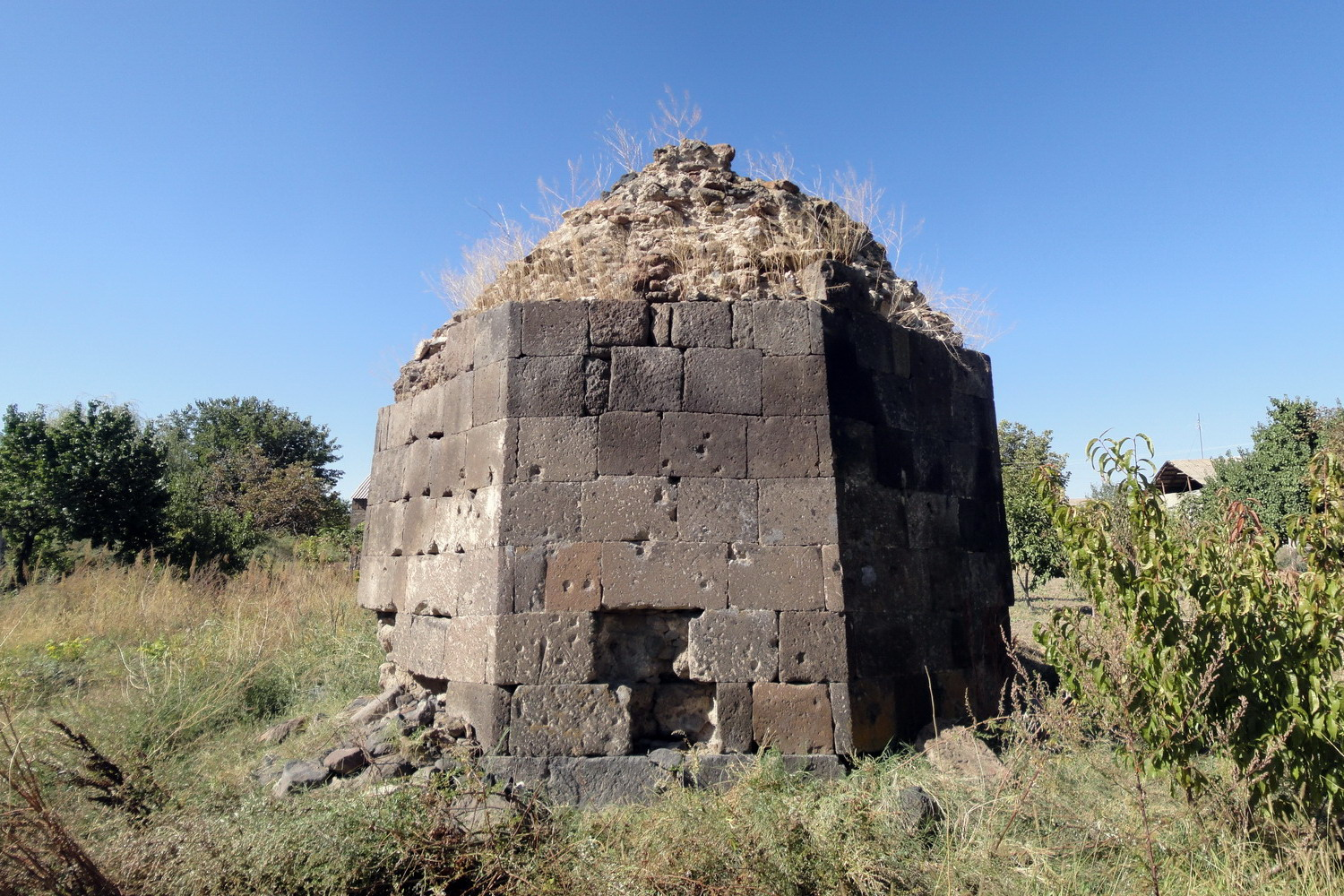
Muslim mausoleum in Aghavnatun

== See also ==
- Armavir Province
