= Teghenik =

Teghenik Թեղենիք
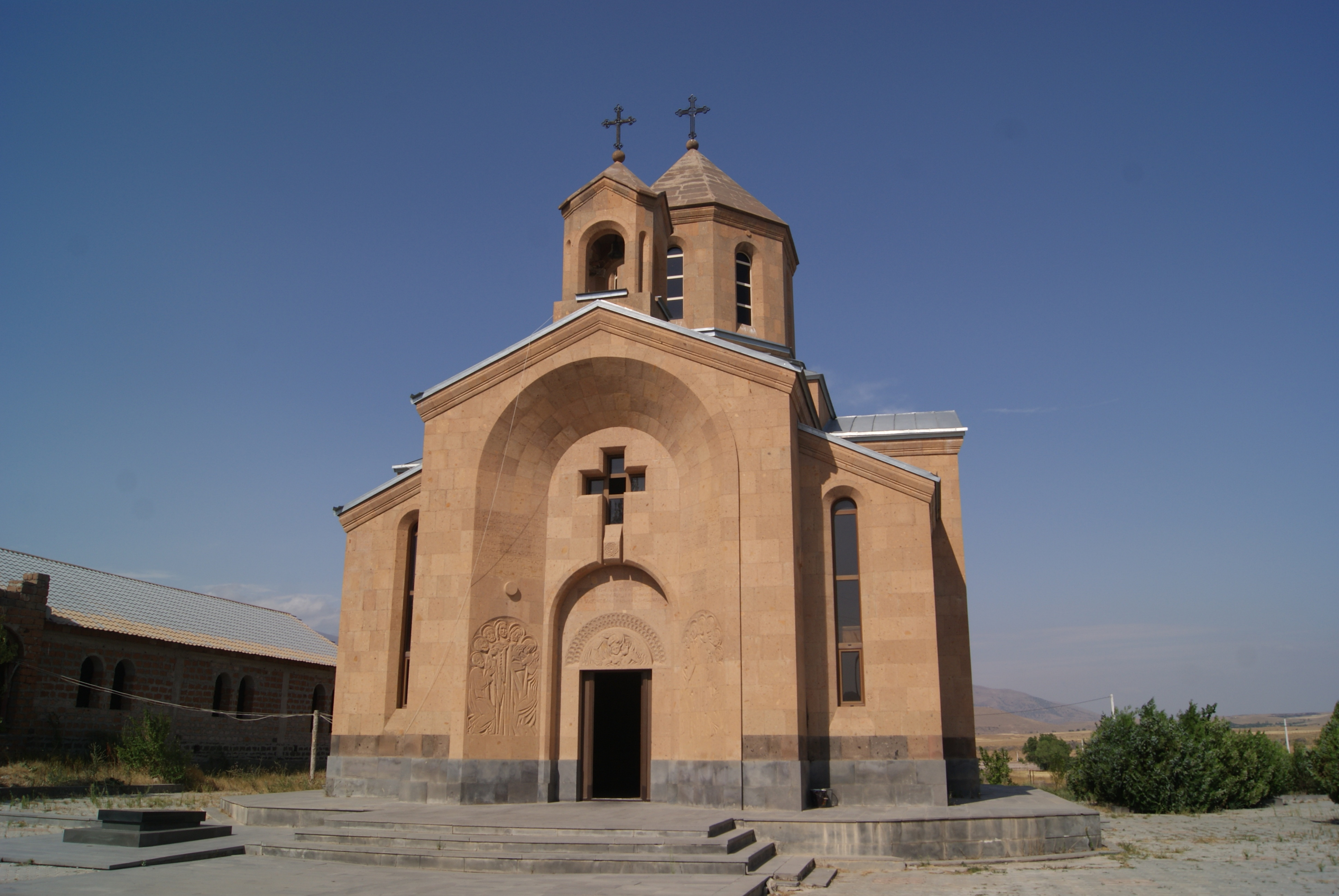
- Holy Martyrs Church of Teghenik

- Location within Armenia
- Coordinates: 40°25′26″N 44°34′32″E
- Country: Armenia
- Marz (Province): Kotayk
- Elevation: 1,620 m (5,310 ft)

Population (2011)
  - Total: 471
- Time zone: UTC+4 (AMT)

Teghenik Armenian: Թեղենիք, formerly Tkhit (Armenian: Թղիթ), is a village in the Kotayk Province of Armenia.

== See also ==
- Kotayk Province
