= Okon Castle =

Armenian castle

Okon Castle (Armenian: Օկոնի ամրոց), is a castle in Armenia.

== Location ==
It is located 25 km West of Yenokavan in the Tavush Region of Armenia. It is 1600–1700 meters above sea level.

== Architecture ==
Okon Castle is a semicircular structure, with walls 3 meters thick. The southern and western parts of the castle are 20 meters from the surrounding walls and were initially constructed as a second line of defense. The southwestern corner of the castle's walls has 5-meter-high towers.
