= Aragatsotn (village) =

Village in Aragatsotn Province of Armenia

Aragatsotn Արագածոտն
- Location within Armenia Location within Aragatsotn
- Coordinates: 40°15′30″N 44°10′58″E
- Country: Armenia
- Province: Aragatsotn
- Municipality: Ashtarak
- Founded: 1971

Population (2011)
  - Total: 1,015
- Time zone: UTC+4
  - Summer (DST): UTC+5

Aragatsotn (Armenian: Արագածոտն) is a village in the Ashtarak Municipality of the Aragatsotn Province of Armenia. Aragatsotn was a former sovkhoz (collective farm), founded in 1971.
