= Kachachkut =

Kachachkut Կաճաճկուտ
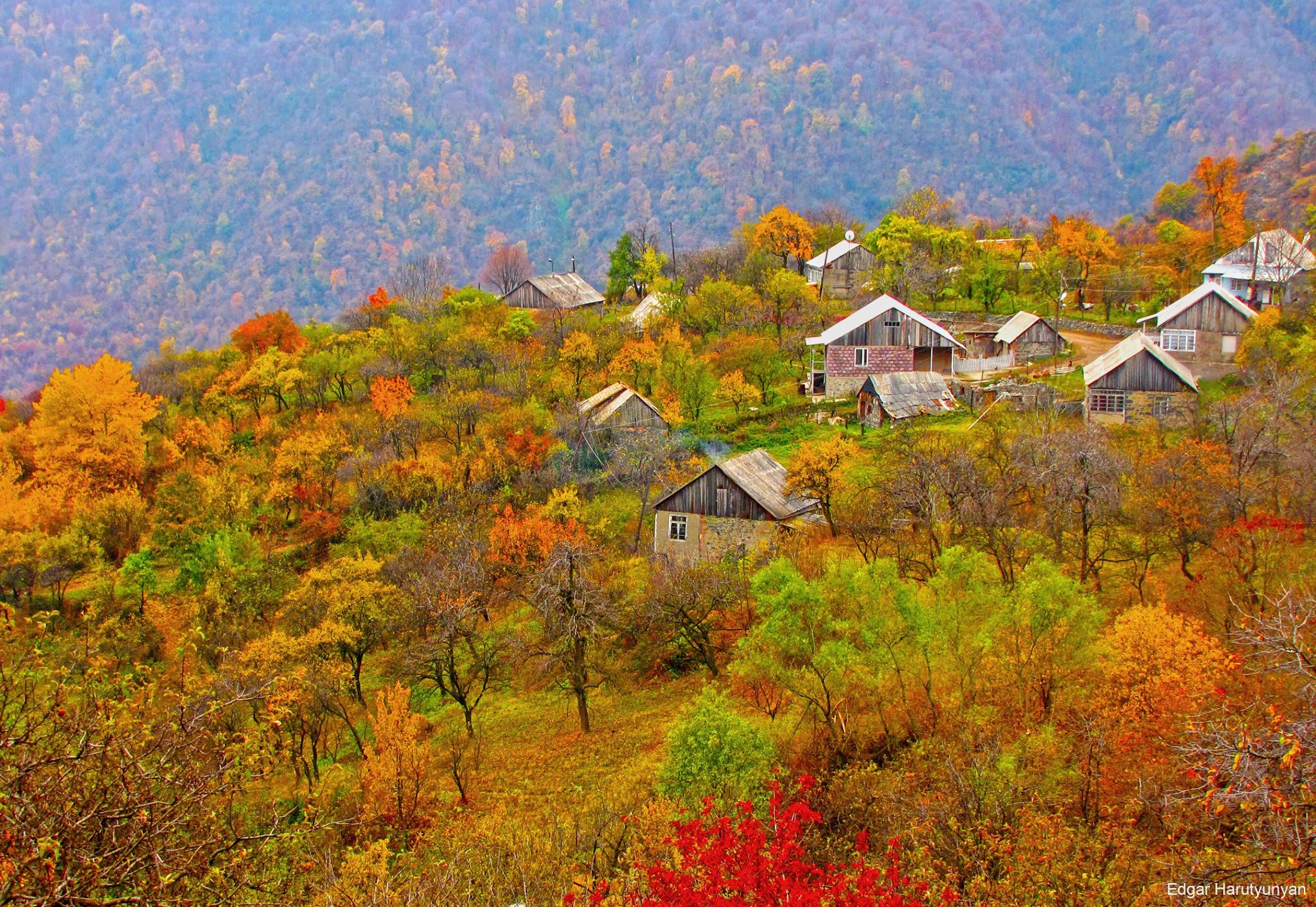
- Kachachkut

- Location within Armenia
- Coordinates: 41°07′N 44°36′E
- Country: Armenia
- Province: Lori
- Elevation: 1,425 m (4,675 ft)

Population (2011)
  - Total: 393
- Time zone: UTC+4 (AMT)

Kachachkut (Armenian: Կաճաճկուտ) is a village in the Lori Province of Armenia.

== History and Demographics ==
Previously, the village had the name of Sedvi. The first clear information about the population in the village was preserved in the first and last tsarist census of 1897.

The population of Katchachkut according to years was as follows.

| Year | 1897 | 1926 | 1939 | 1959 | 1970 | 1979 | 1989 | 2001 | 2011 |
| Residents | 29 | 391 | 663 | 653 | 701 | 483 | 476 | 537 | 393 |

== Economy ==
The population is mainly engaged in animal husbandry, horticulture and cultivation.

== Historical heritage sites ==
In the village, there is a 13th-century monastery. St. Nshan Monastic Complex of Sedvi is located to the south of the village of Kachachkut, in the Sedvi canyon. The monastic complex was built in the 13th century and it consists of St. Nshan Church, which is attached to the chapel, belfry, auxiliary buildings and the remains of the walls.

== Tourism ==
Kachachkut is a popular destination for hiking and camping. There are forests nearby with blueberries and red raspberries. During the summer season locals collect and sell products to visitors of the village.

== Gallery ==
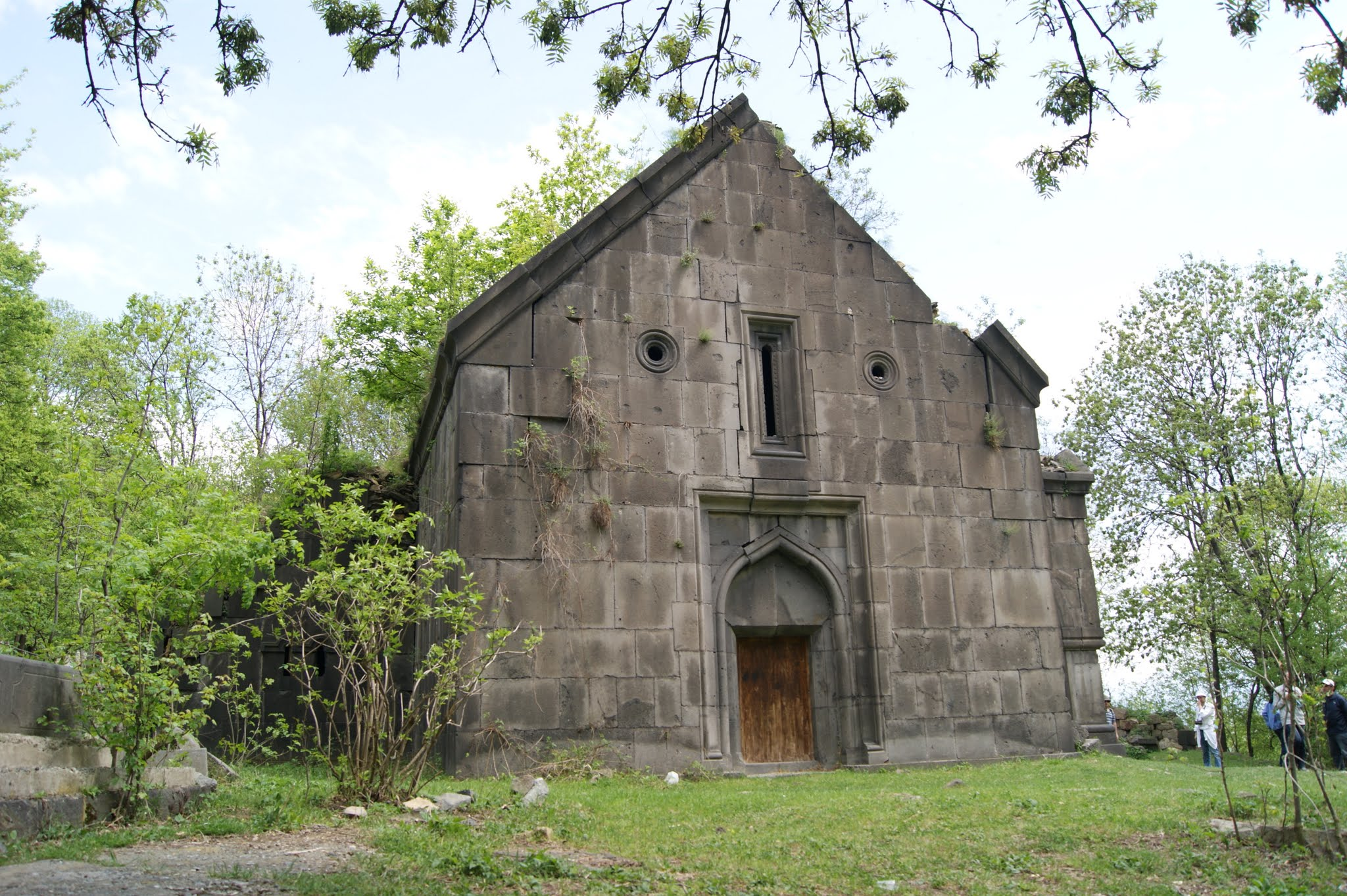

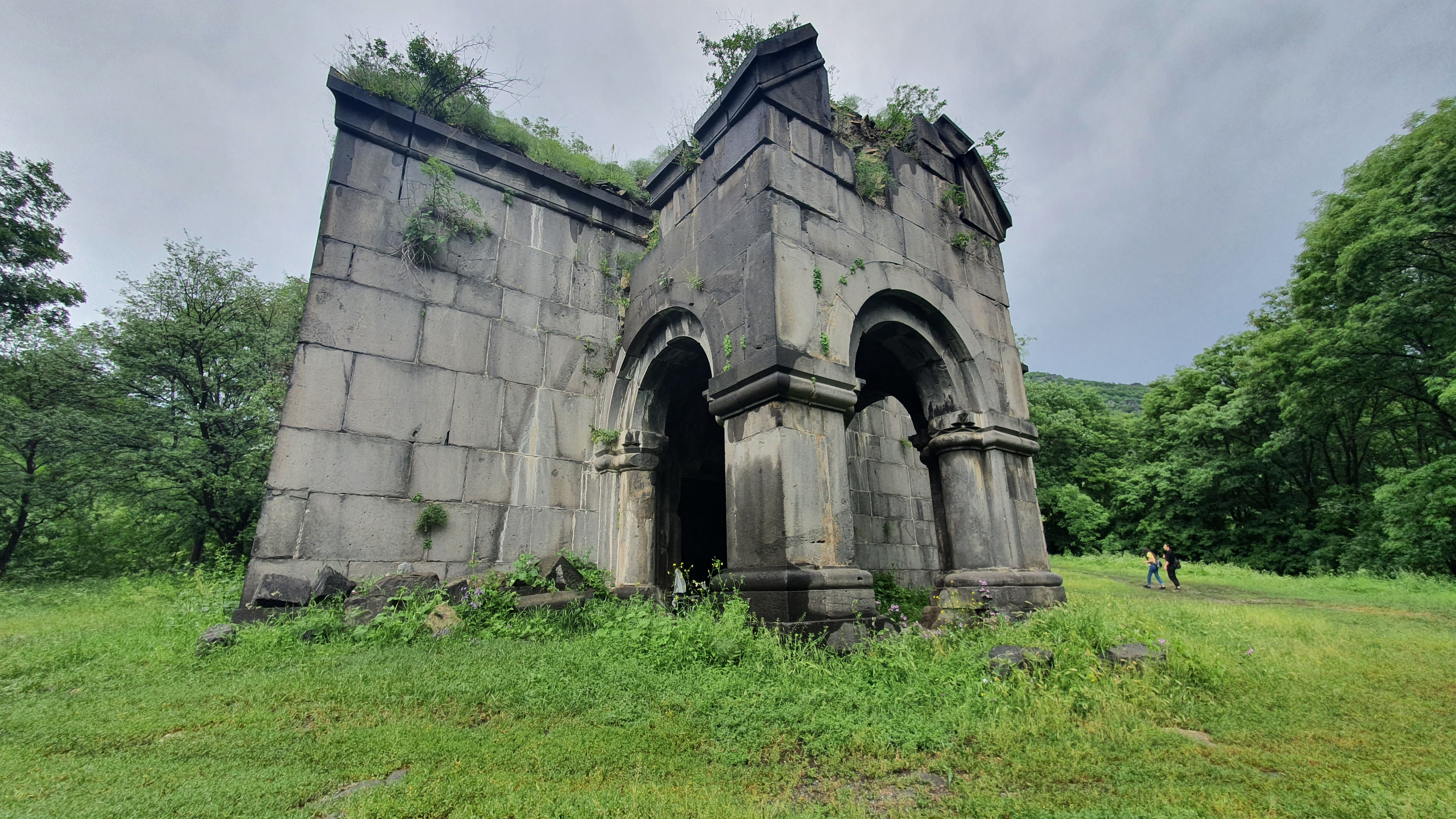

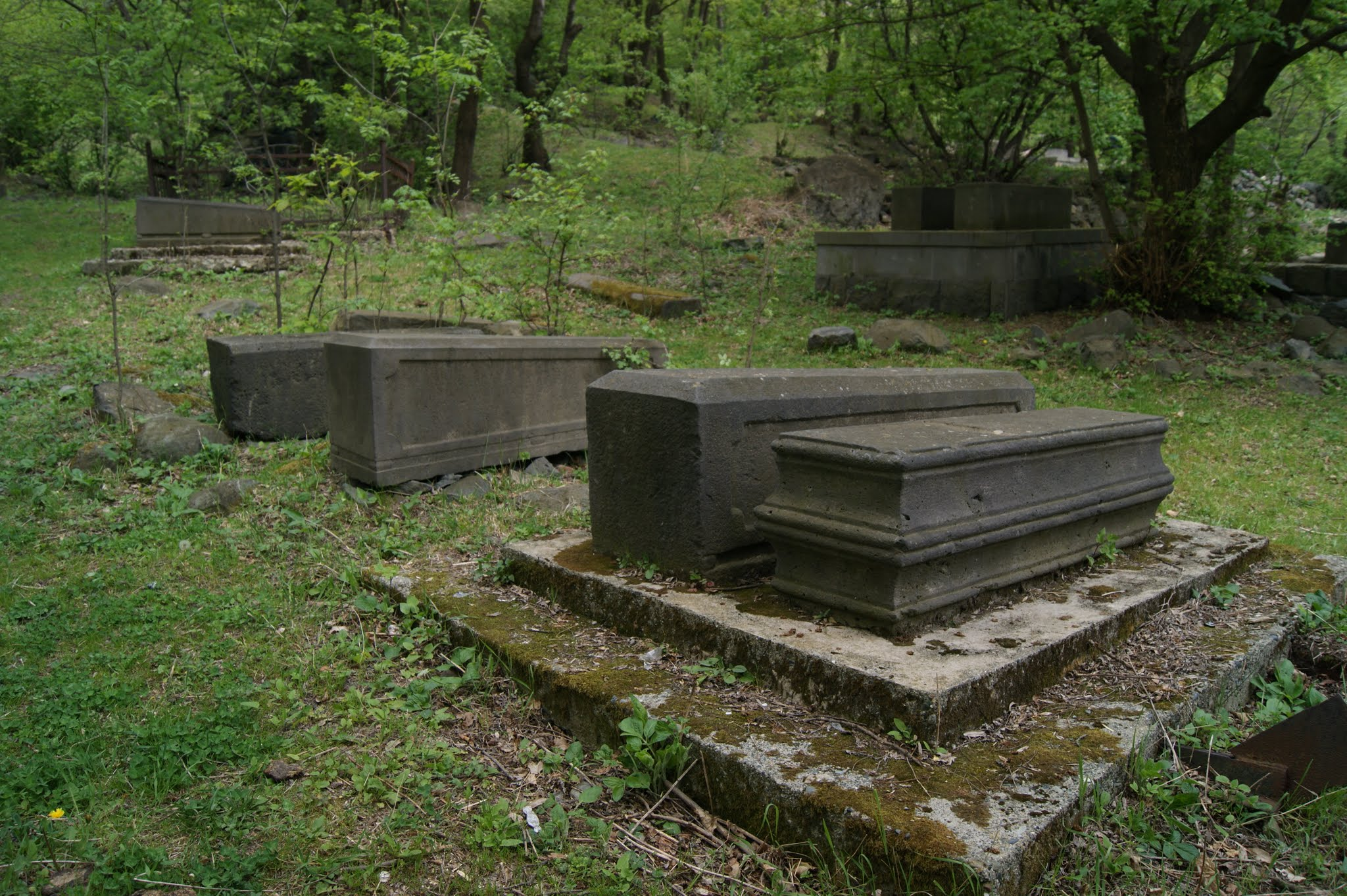
