= Pokr Sepasar =

Village in Shirak, Armenia

Pokr Sepasar Փոքր Սեպասար
- Location within Armenia Location within Shirak
- Coordinates: 41°02′09″N 43°48′47″E
- Country: Armenia
- Province: Shirak
- Municipality: Ashotsk

Population (2011)
  - Total: 173
- Time zone: UTC+4
  - Summer (DST): UTC+5

Pokr Sepasar (Armenian: Փոքր Սեպասար) is a village in the Ashotsk Municipality of the Shirak Province of Armenia.

== Demographics ==
Historical population
Year	Pop.	±% p.a.
1897	177	—
1926	362	+2.50%
1939	491	+2.37%
1959	387	−1.18%
1979	59	−8.98%
1989	163	+10.70%
2001	172	+0.45%
2011	173	+0.06%
