= Nerkin Bazmaberd =

Nerkin Bazmaberd Ներքին Բազմաբերդ
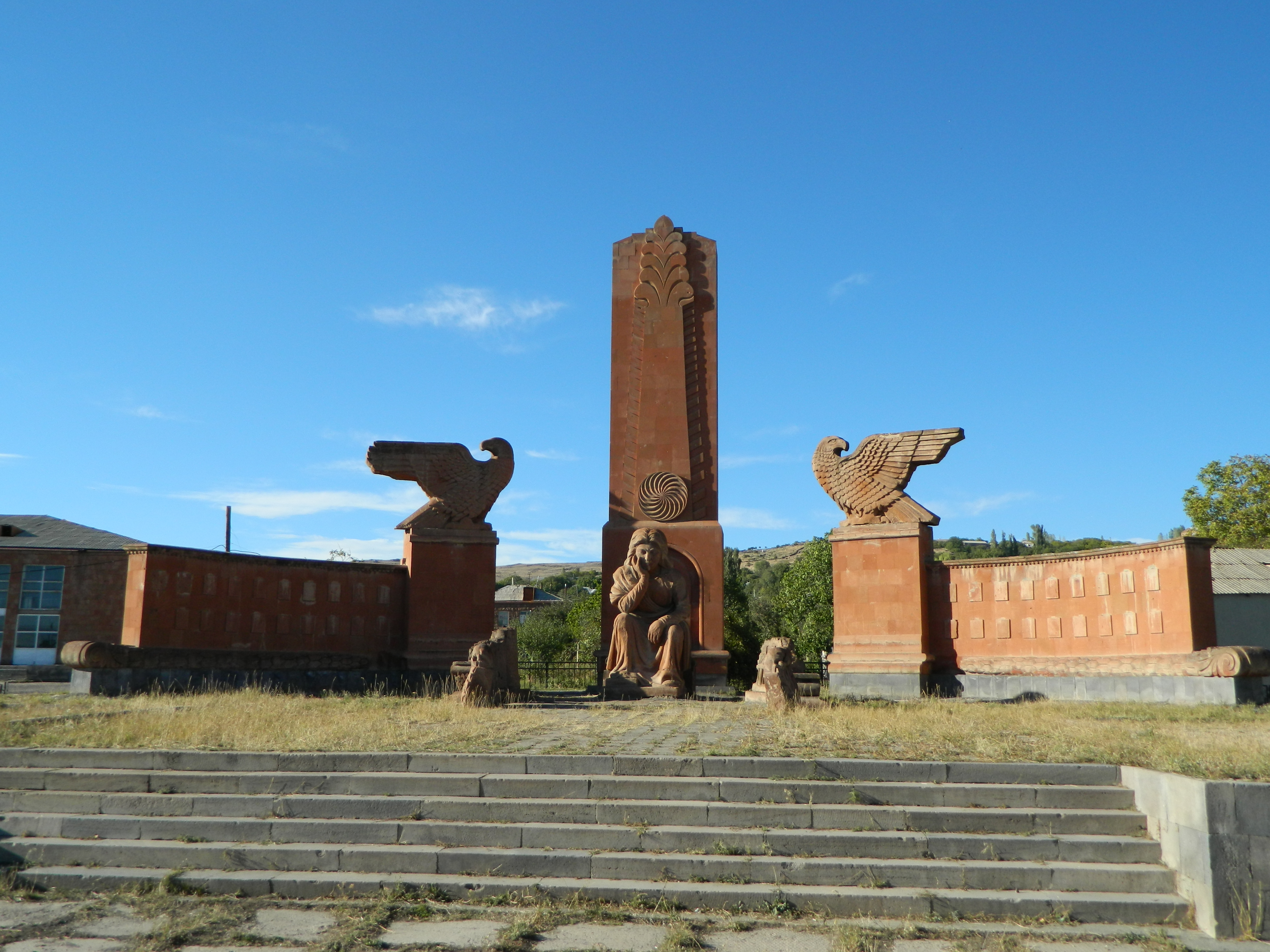
- ՀՈՒՇԱՐՁԱՆ` ԵՐԿՐՈՐԴ ԱՇԽԱՐՀԱՄԱՐՏՈՒՄ ԶՈՀՎԱԾՆԵՐԻ ՀԻՇԱՏԱԿԻՆ

- Location within Armenia Location within Aragatsotn
- Coordinates: 40°20′43″N 44°03′20″E
- Country: Armenia
- Province: Aragatsotn
- Municipality: Talin

Population (2011)
  - Total: 1,417
- Time zone: UTC+4
  - Summer (DST): UTC+5

Nerkin Bazmaberd (Armenian: Ներքին Բազմաբերդ), formerly known as Agdzhakala, Aghjaghala, Nerkin Agdzhakala, or Nerkin Hajighala, is a village in the Talin Municipality of the Aragatsotn Province of Armenia. It was renamed Nerkin Bazmaberd on November 12, 1946. The population descends from refugees and migrants from the occupied Sasun and Mush provinces of the Ottoman Empire (current Turkey) in 1915–1918.
