= Madina, Armenia =

Village in Gegharkunik, Armenia

Madina Մադինա
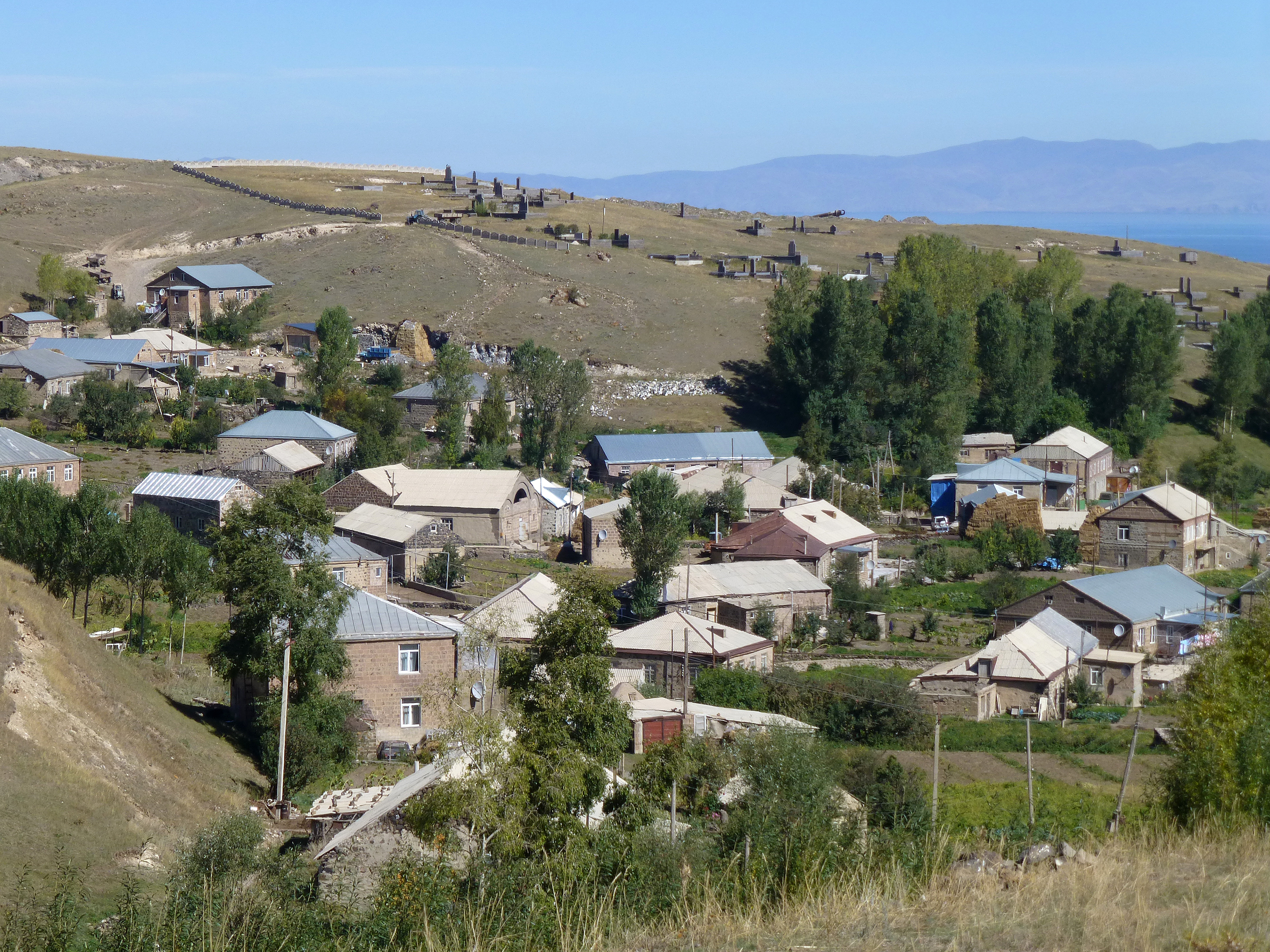
- A view of Madina

- Location within Armenia Location within Gegharkunik
- Coordinates: 40°04′49″N 45°15′04″E
- Country: Armenia
- Province: Gegharkunik
- Municipality: Martuni

Population (2011)
  - Total: 1,111
- Time zone: UTC+4 (AMT)

Madina (Armenian: Մադինա) is a village in the Martuni Municipality of the Gegharkunik Province of Armenia. To the west of Madina is Mount Armaghan, an extinct volcano that rises 450 meters higher than the surrounding plain with a small crater lake at its center.

== History ==
According to the Russian statistical source Sbornik svedenij o Kavkaze, the village of Madina had as of 1873 a population of 208 people, all of them Azeris. By 1911, the population had risen to 443 people.

== Gallery ==
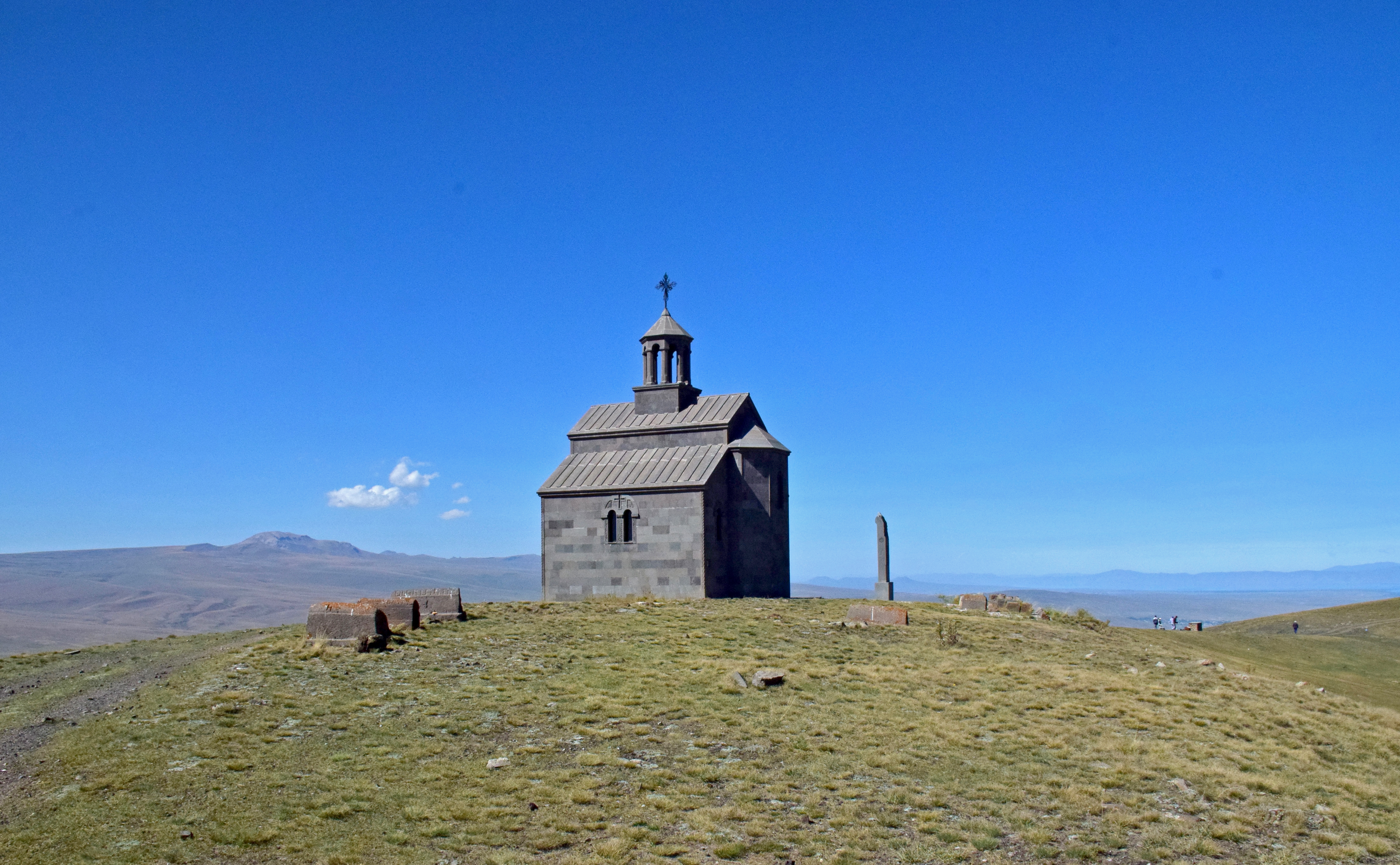
Chapel on Mount Armaghan

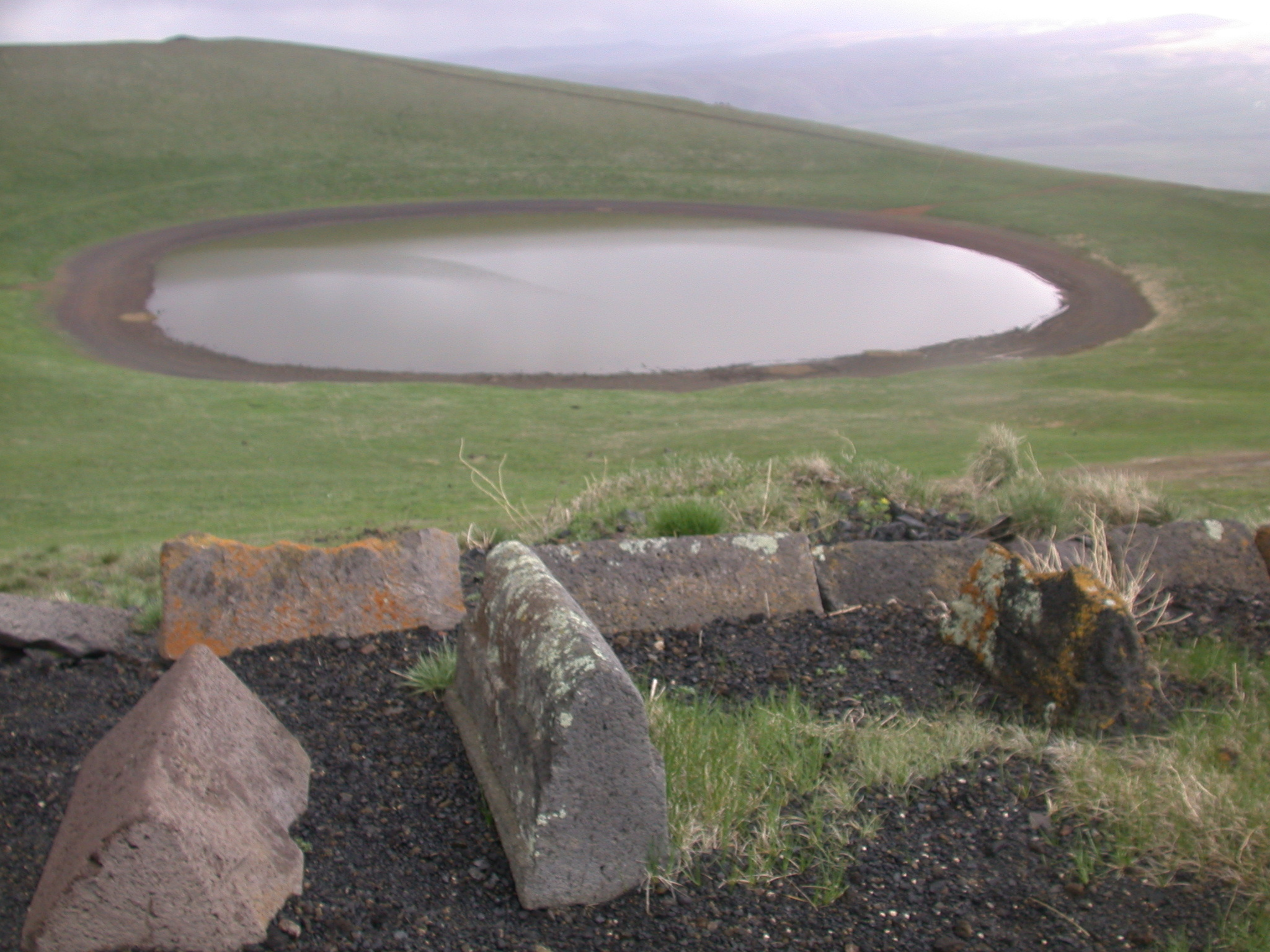
On top of Mount Armaghan

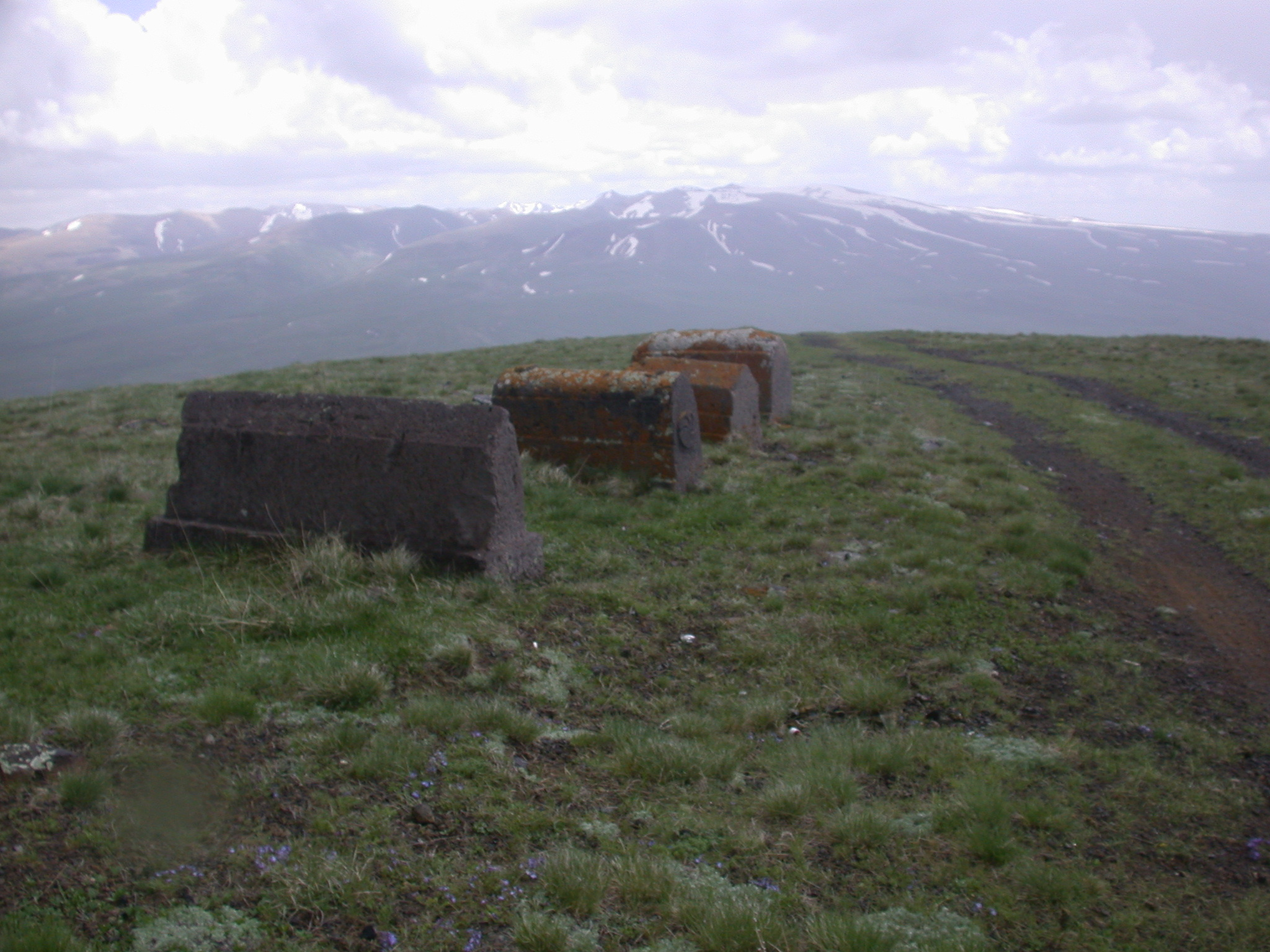
Cemetery on top of Mount Armaghan
