= Geghashen =

Geghashen Գեղաշեն
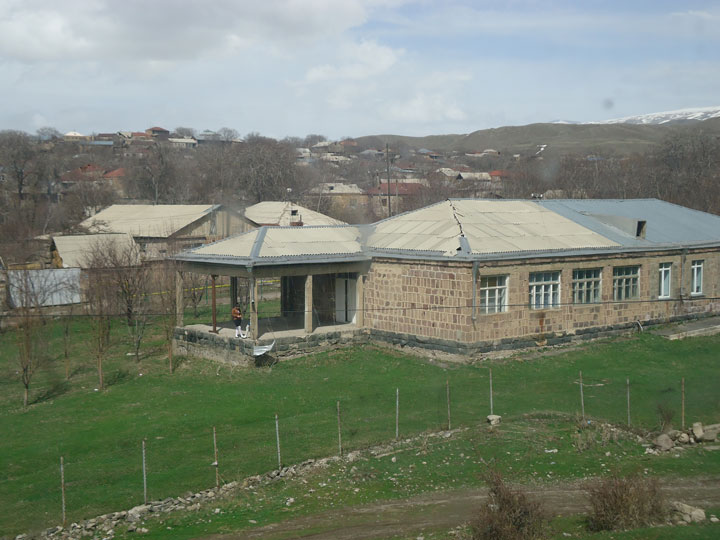
- Geghashen

- Location within Armenia
- Coordinates: 40°14′04″N 44°43′37″E
- Country: Armenia
- Province: Kotayk

Population (2011)
  - Total: 3,937

Geghashen (Armenian: Գեղաշեն, until 1935 Chatkran; until 1967 Hrazdan) is a village in the Kotayk Province of Armenia.

== See also ==
- Kotayk Province
