= Getashen =

Getashen or Getachen may refer to:

- Getashen, Armavir, Armenia
- alternate name of Getazat, Armenia
- former name of Kirants, Armenia
- Nerkin Getashen, Armenia
- Verin Getashen, Armenia
- Çaykənd, Goygol, Azerbaijan

== See also ==
- Getishen, Armenia
- Gtashen, Armenia
