= Adyaman =

Adyaman may refer to:

- Garnovit, Armenia
- Nerkin Getashen, Armenia
- Verin Getashen, Armenia
