= Kotavank =

Cultural heritage monument of Armenia

Kotavank Կոթավանք
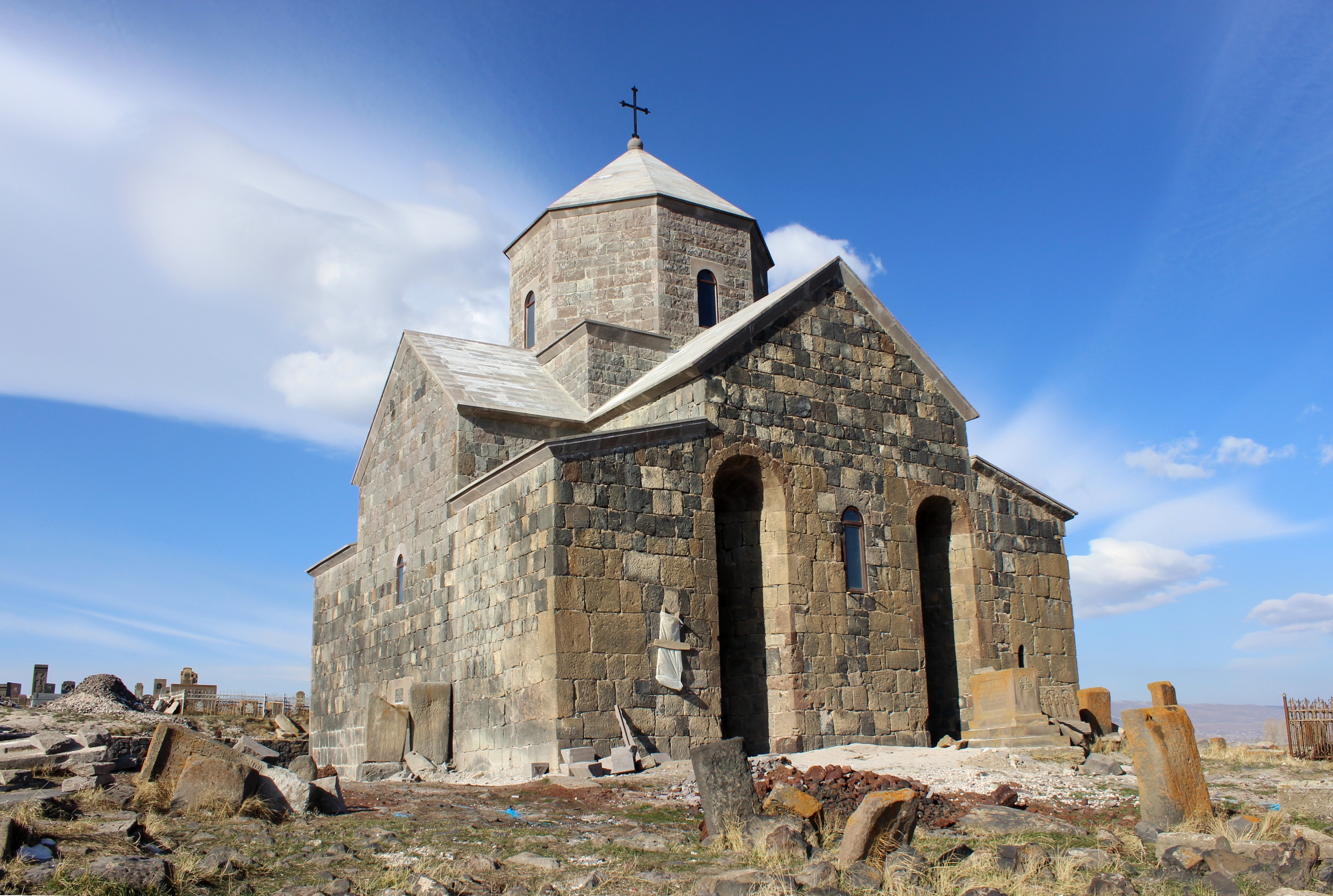
- Kotavank (south and east walls) and the adjacent cemetery (after renovation as of November 2014).

- Location within Armenia Location within Gegharkunik

Religion
- Affiliation: Armenian Apostolic Church
- Region: Caucasus
- Status: Ruins

Location
- Location: Nerkin Getashen, Gegharkunik Province, Armenia
- Coordinates: 40.14137°N 45.264737°E

Architecture
- Type: Armenian, Church
- Style: Domed cruciform central-plan
- Founder: Grigor Supan
- Completed: 9th century
- Dome: 1 (collapsed)

Kotavank (Armenian: Կոթավանք or Կոթի Սուրբ Աստվածածին եկեղեցին; also Surb Astvatsatsin meaning "Holy Mother of God") is a church located on a hill overlooking the Argitchi River and village of Nerkin Getashen, south of Lake Sevan in the Gegharkunik Province of Armenia. A large medieval cemetery surrounds the church with numerous khachkars. A modern cemetery adjacent has started to encroach upon the old one, leaving many of the khachkars and ancient tombstones upturned in a pile, moved from their original locations. Upon a hill adjacent to the modern cemetery is yet another ancient cemetery with many khachkars. Within the village is a small ruined basilica called "Jam" by the locals with ancient khachkars and tombstones built into its walls, and not far away is a small shrine. There are also two large stone forts from the Middle Ages located 2 km to the east and 3 km the west of the village. Other khachkars may be seen along the main road leading to the hill where Kotavank rests upon. In early medieval years it was the capital of the region known during that time as Kot. Both Kotavank and Kot were partially destroyed during invasions in the 10th and 11th centuries and later by an earthquake.

== Architecture ==
The church of S. Astvatsatsin was built in the 9th century by Prince Grigor Supan, the son of Princess Mariam, who reigned from the late 9th to the early 10th century. It has a large cruciform rectangular-plan constructed from roughly hewn basalt blocks. There are two portals that lead into the space from the south and west walls. The roof, drum, and dome have since collapsed, while the walls, some of the vaulting (one vault has collapsed), and the semicircular apse with four side rooms are still intact. The apse of the church is located at the eastern end of the church. The north and south wings are semicircular in plan, whereas the west wing is rectangular. Two of the prayer rooms or "studies" are entered through the north and south walls of the western rectangular wing. The other two are entered from the east walls of the northern and southern semicircular wings. Above the studies were secret chambers that were meant to be used as places to hide from invading armies. These areas are partially viewable through two holes high upon the wall on either side of the apse. The dome and drum that once stood above, had numerous decorations. Under the church were two tunnels; one that lead from the church to a nearby spring, and another used as an escape route in case of invasion that lead from the church to the valley.

== Gallery ==
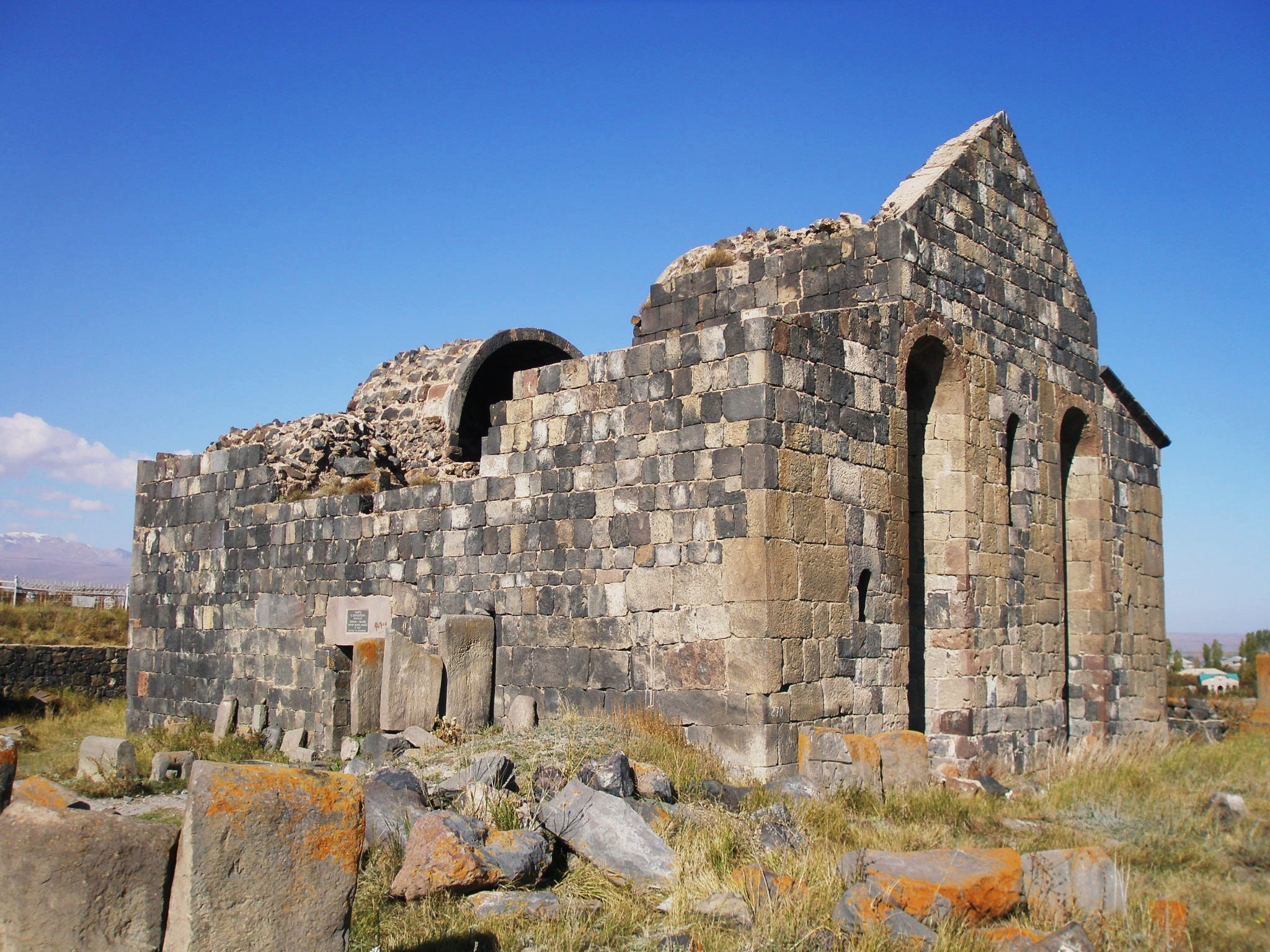
South and east walls (prior to renovation).

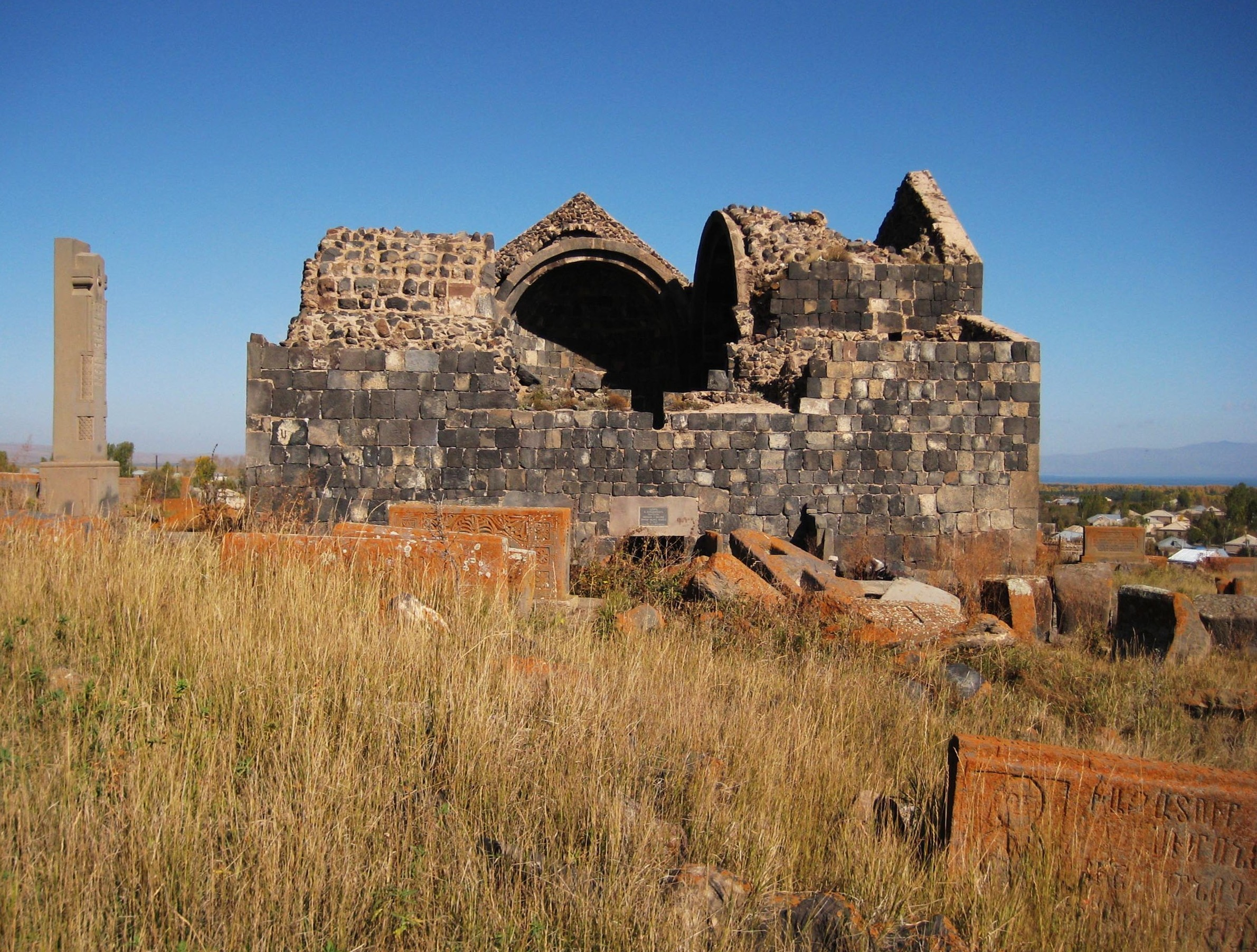
South view of Kotavank (prior to renovation).

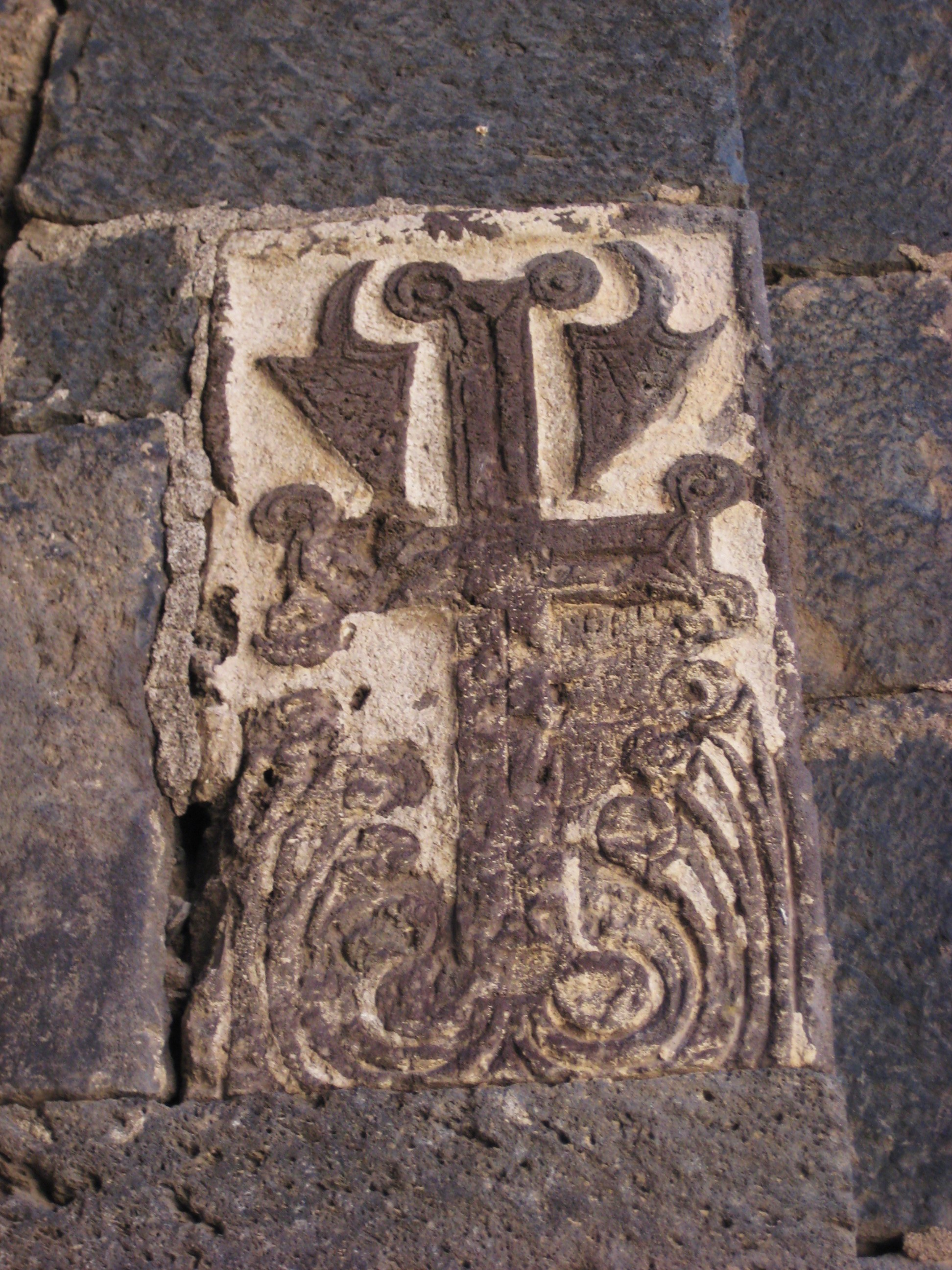
Decorative stone embedded into the wall near the apse.

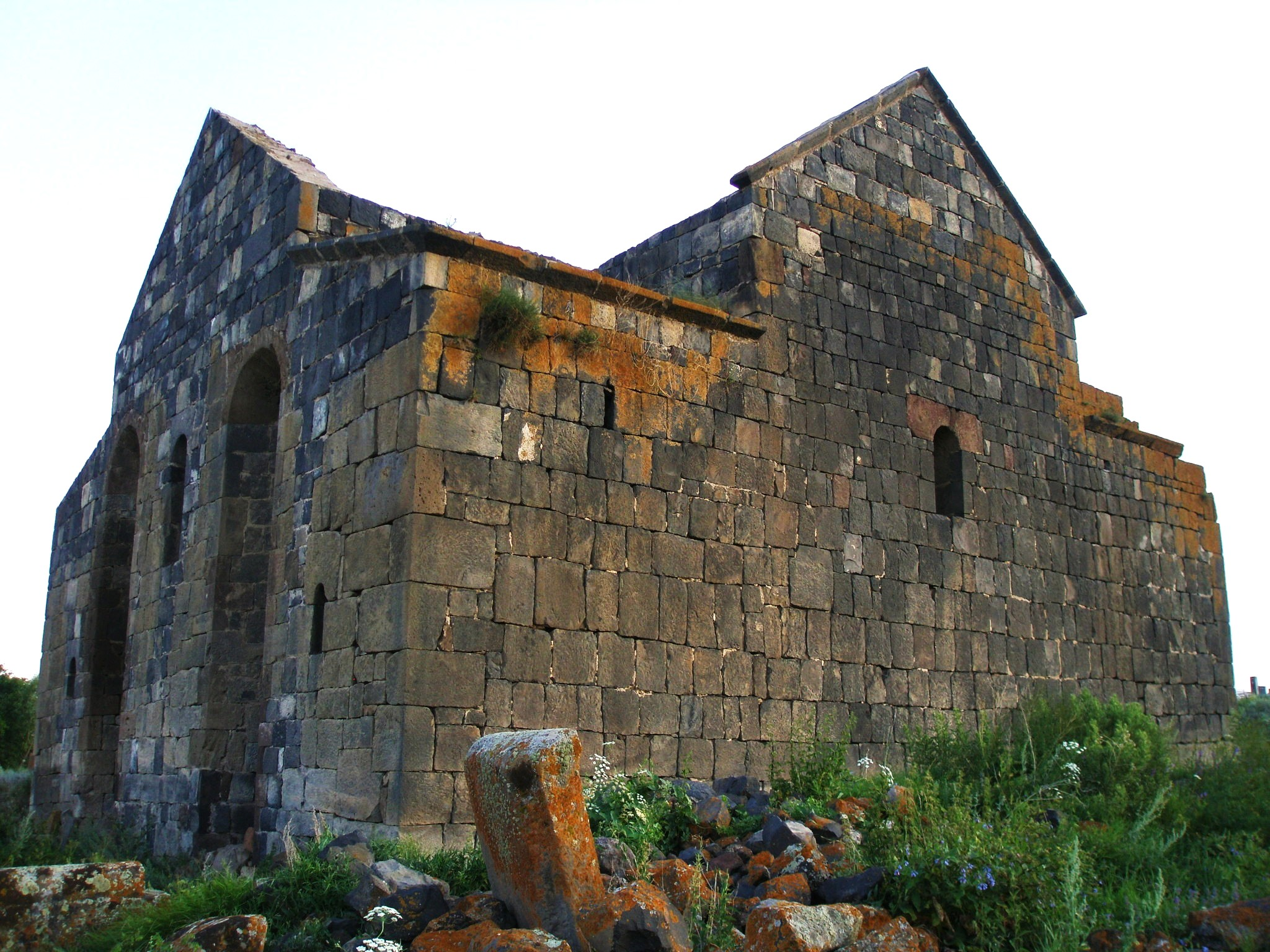
Side view at the north and east wall (prior to renovation).

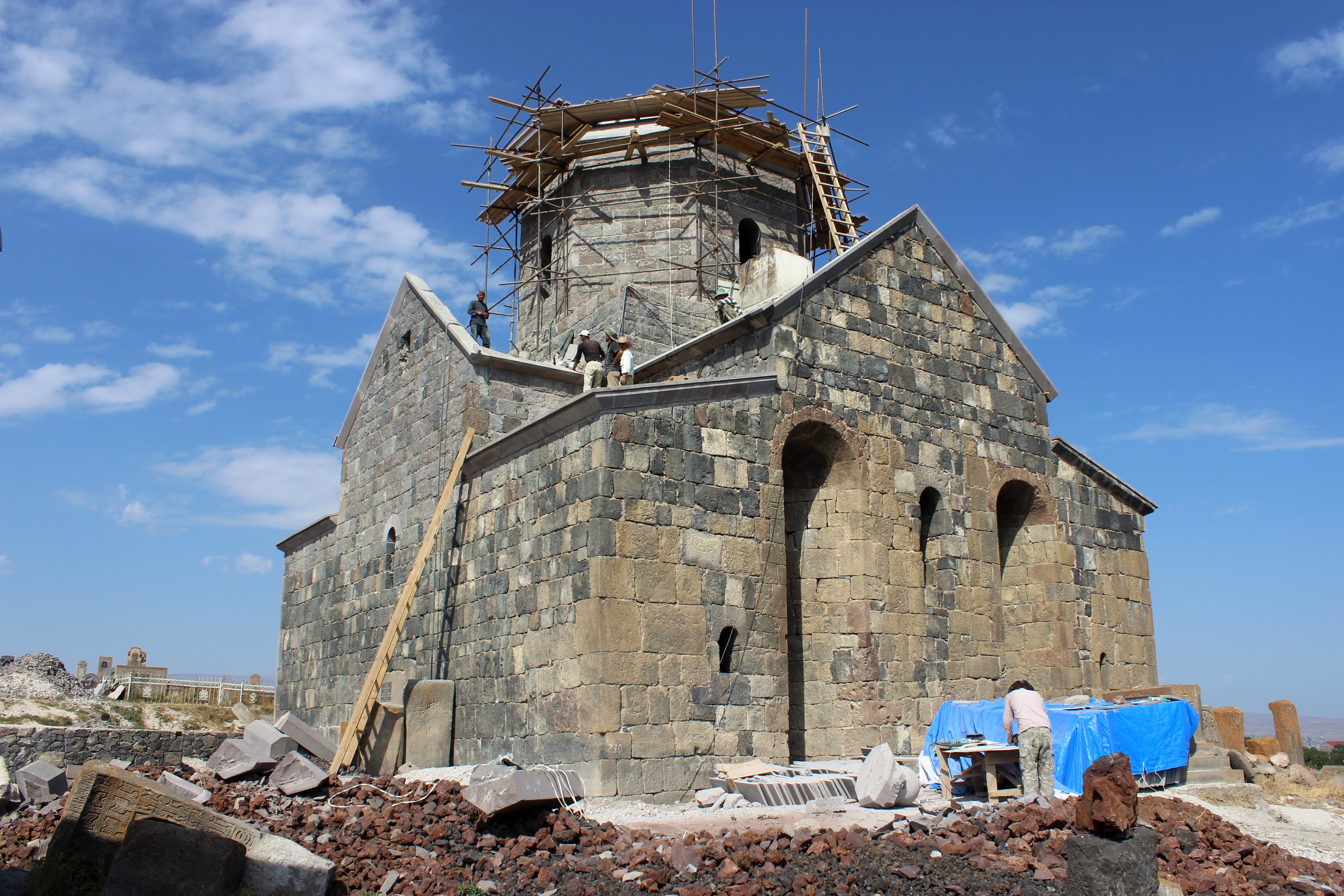
Renovation of the church as of September 2014.

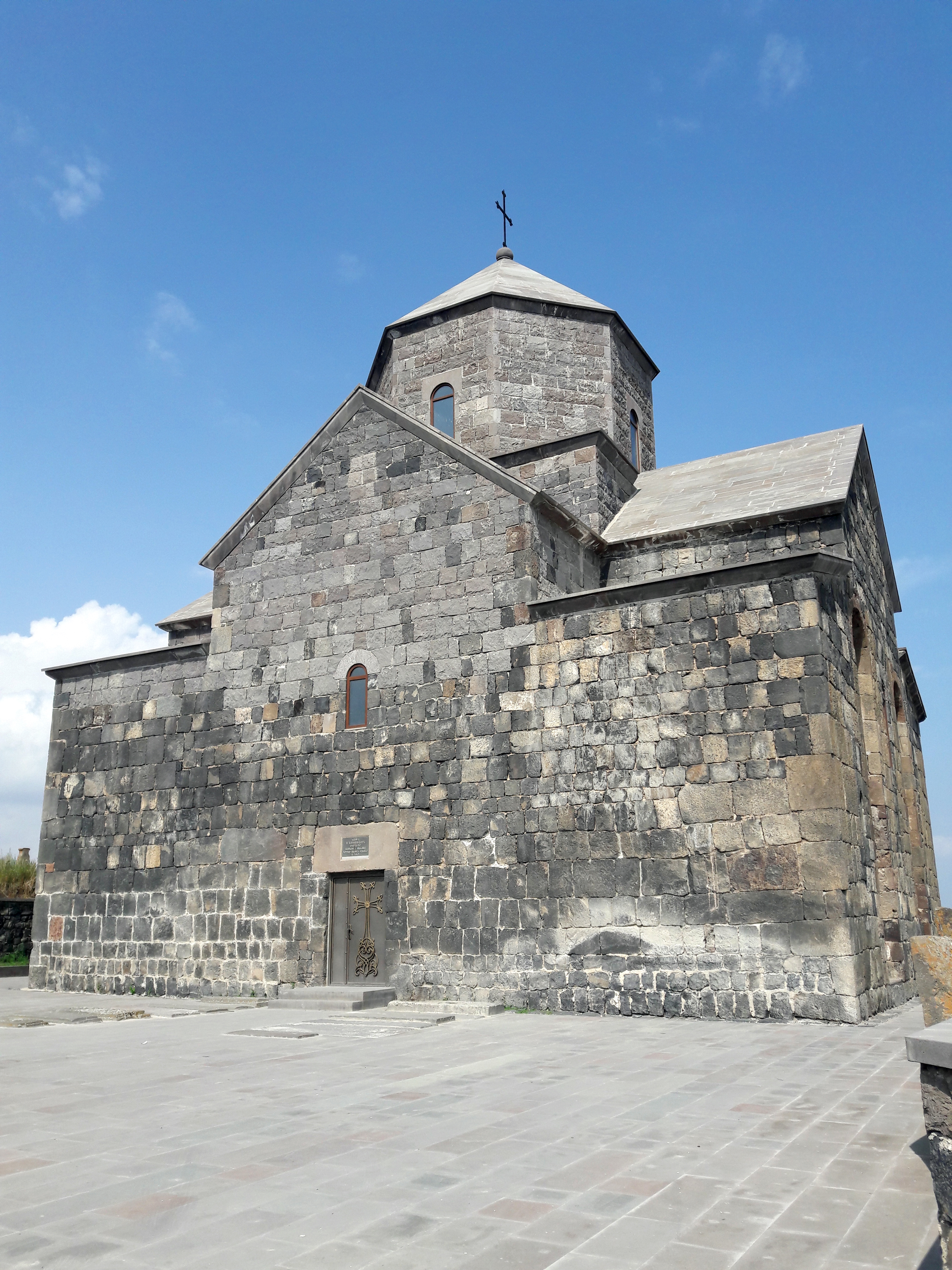
Renovation of the church.

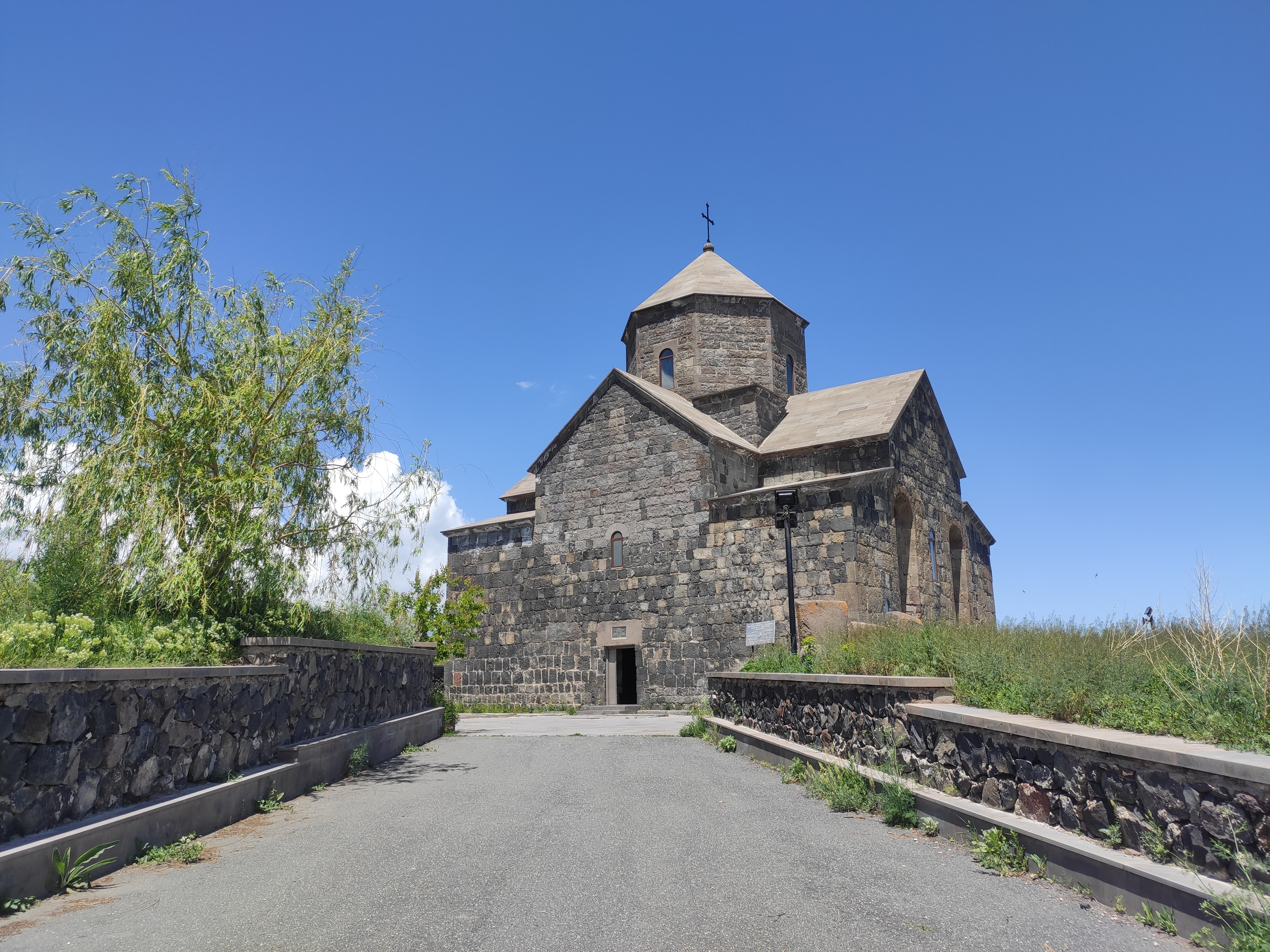

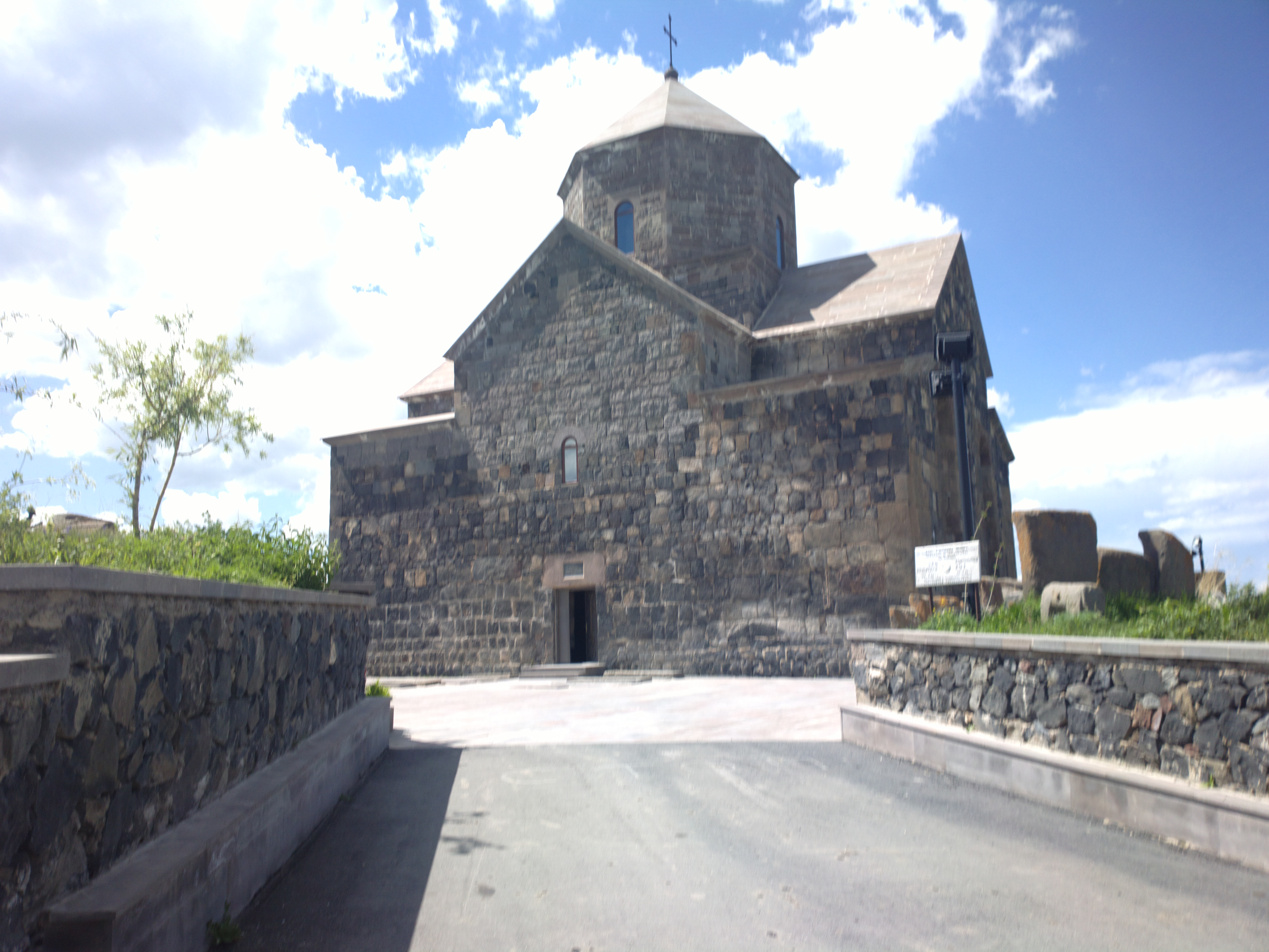

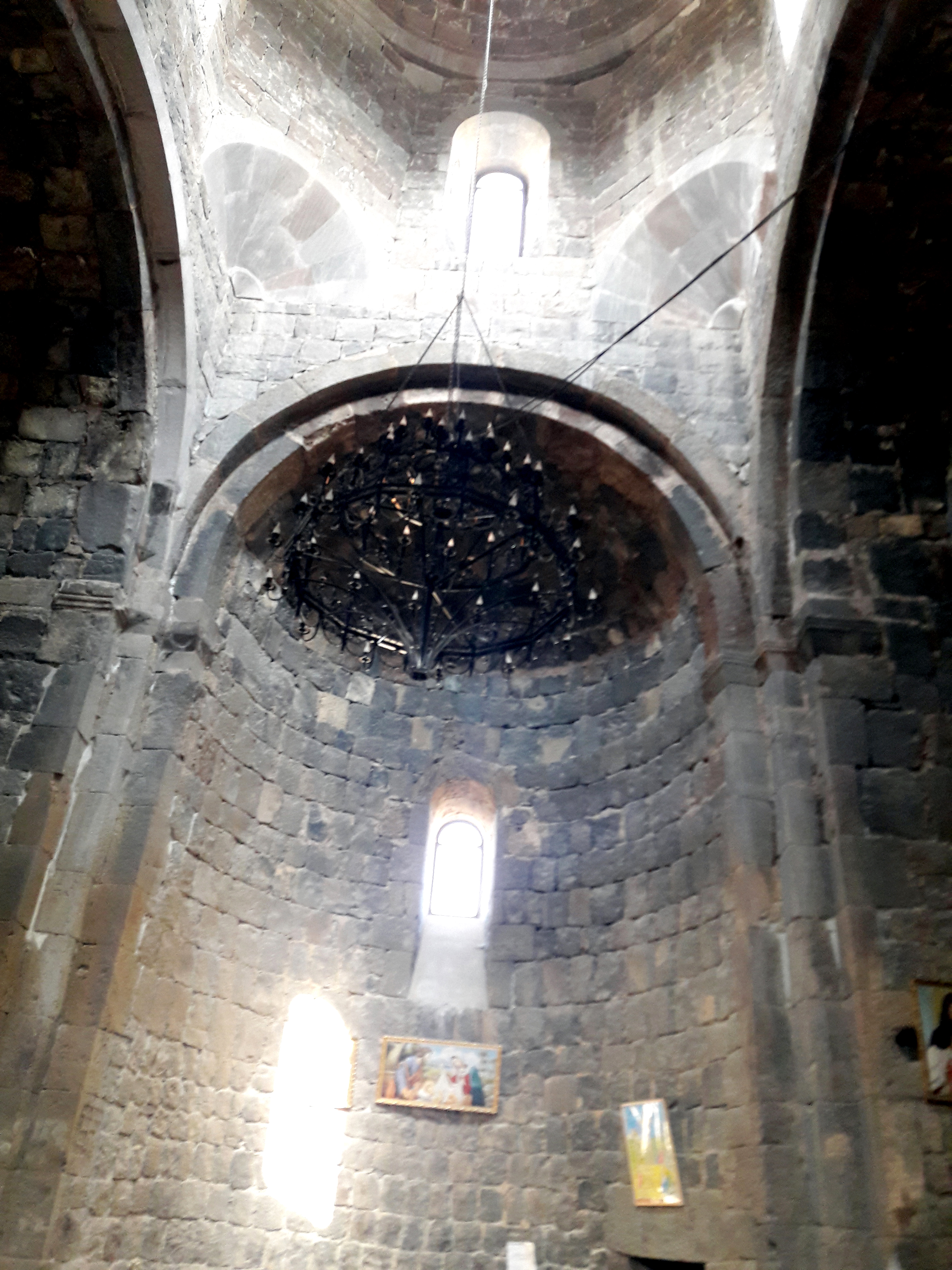

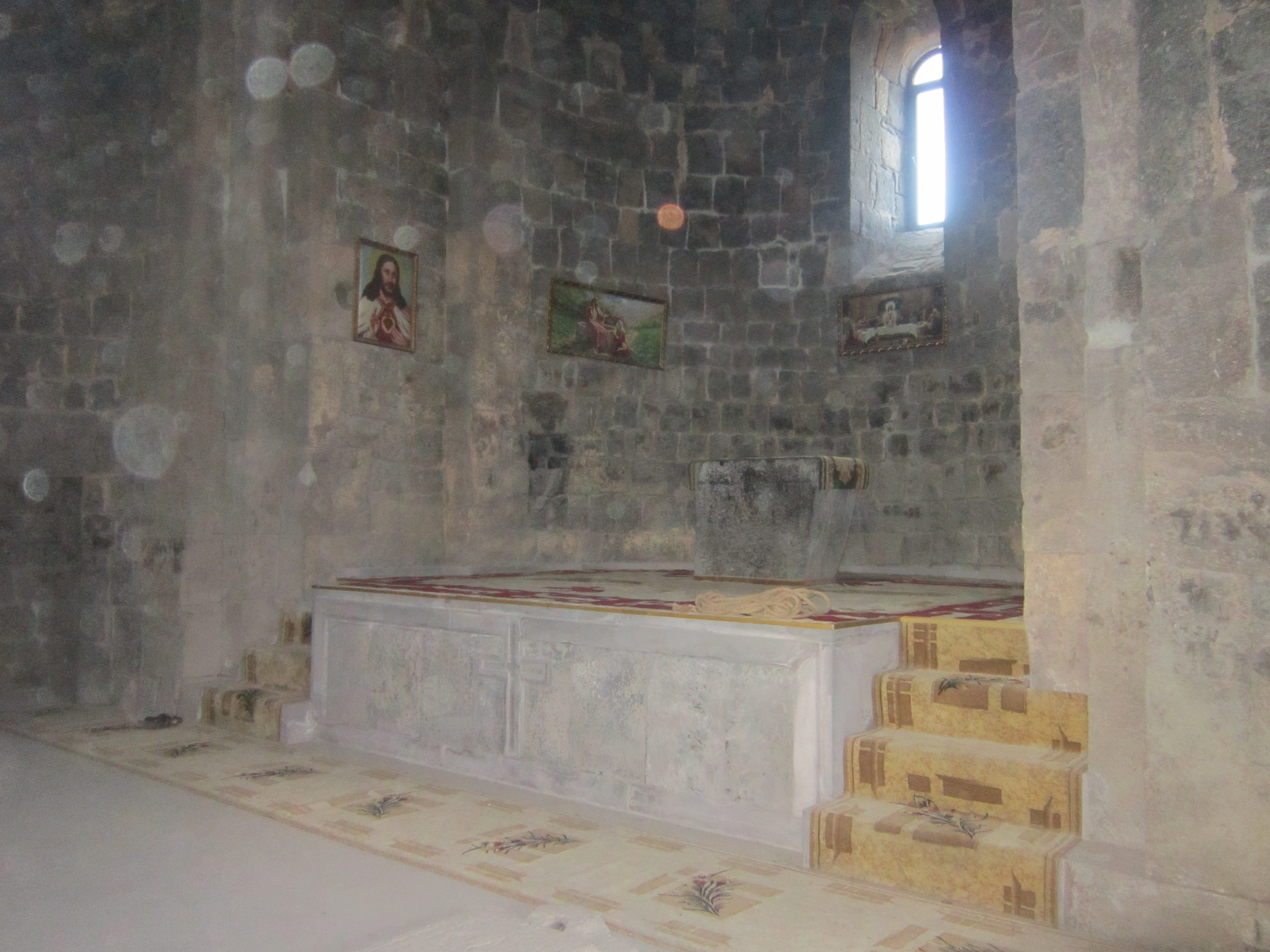

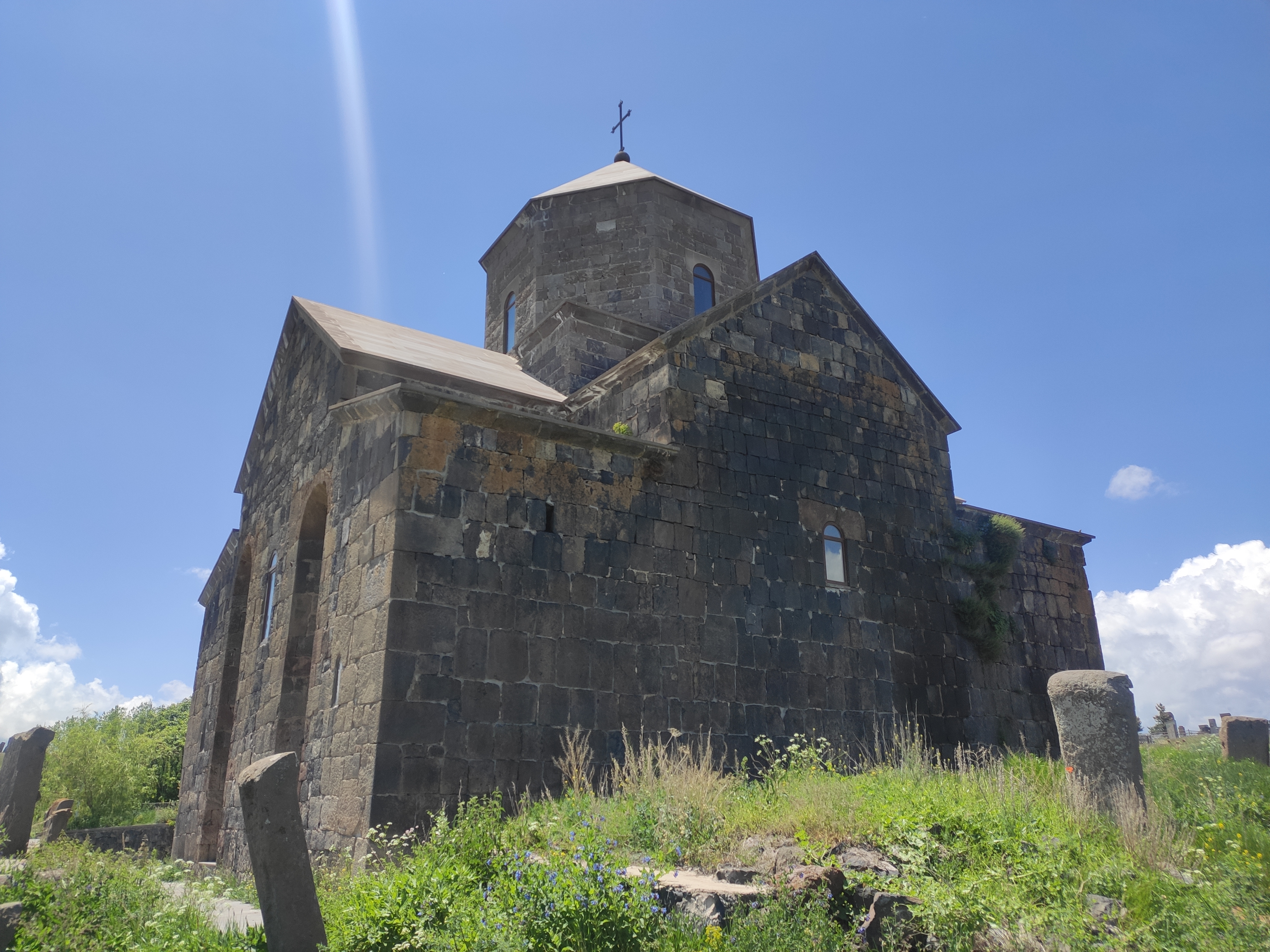

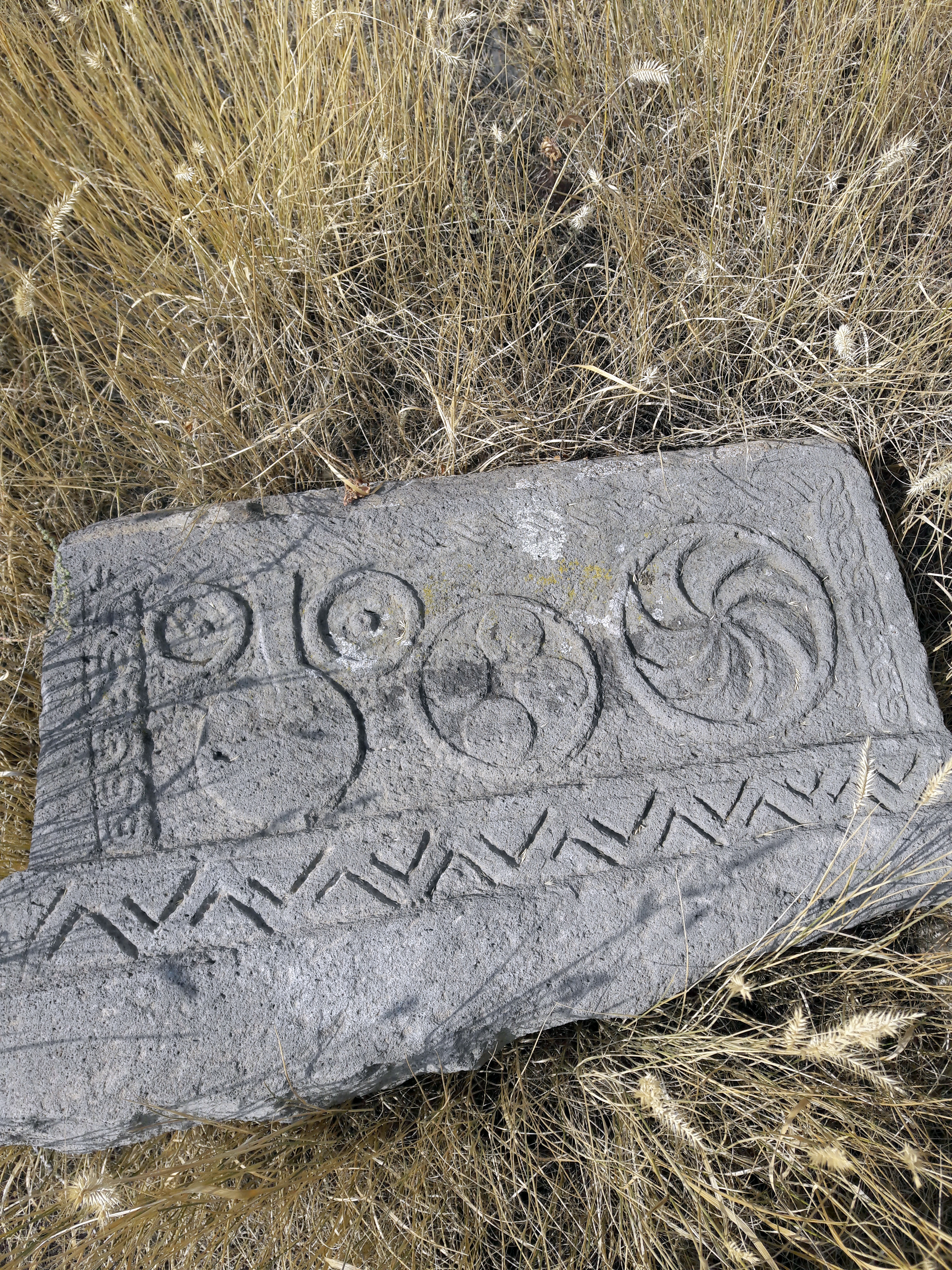

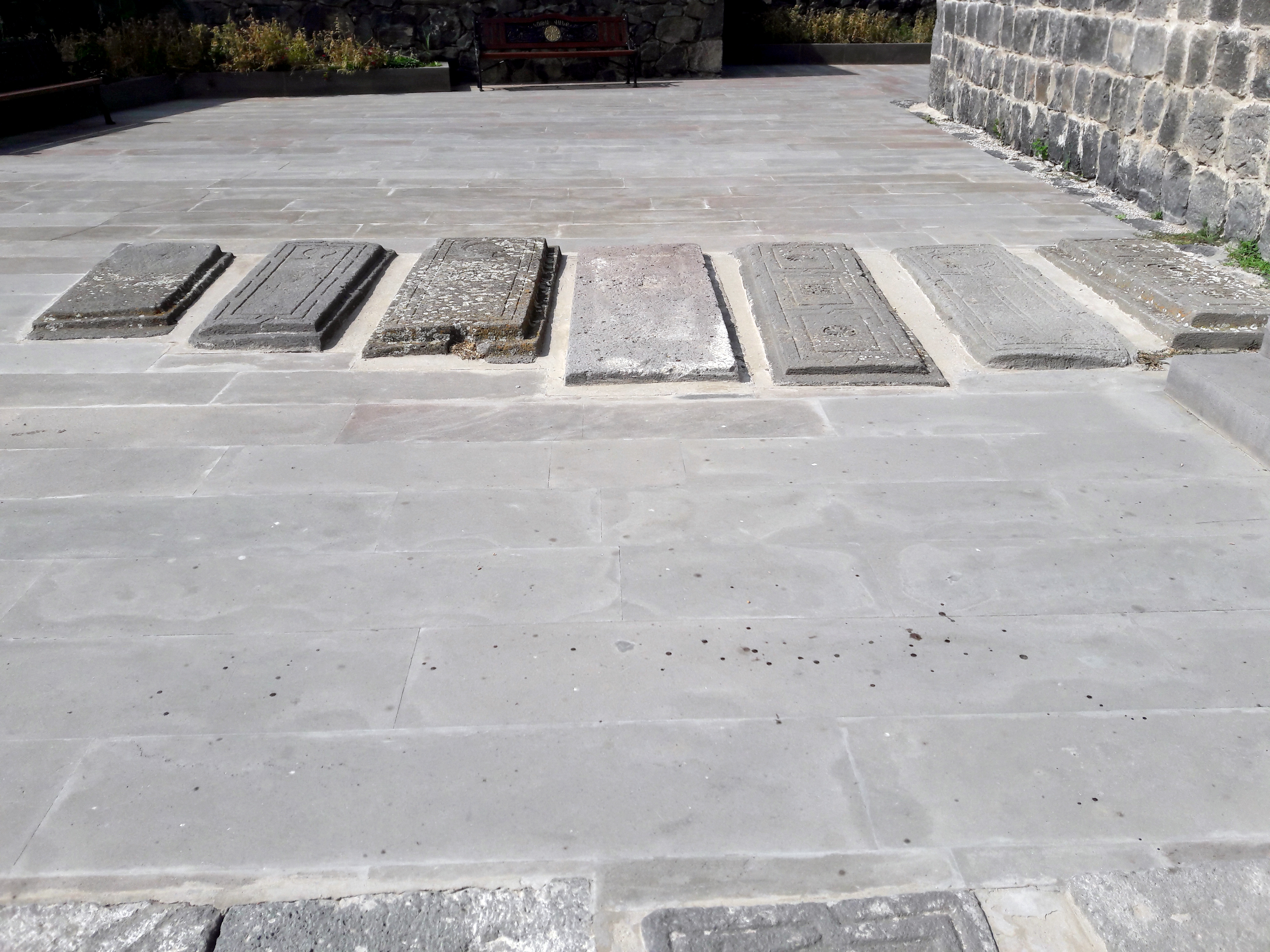

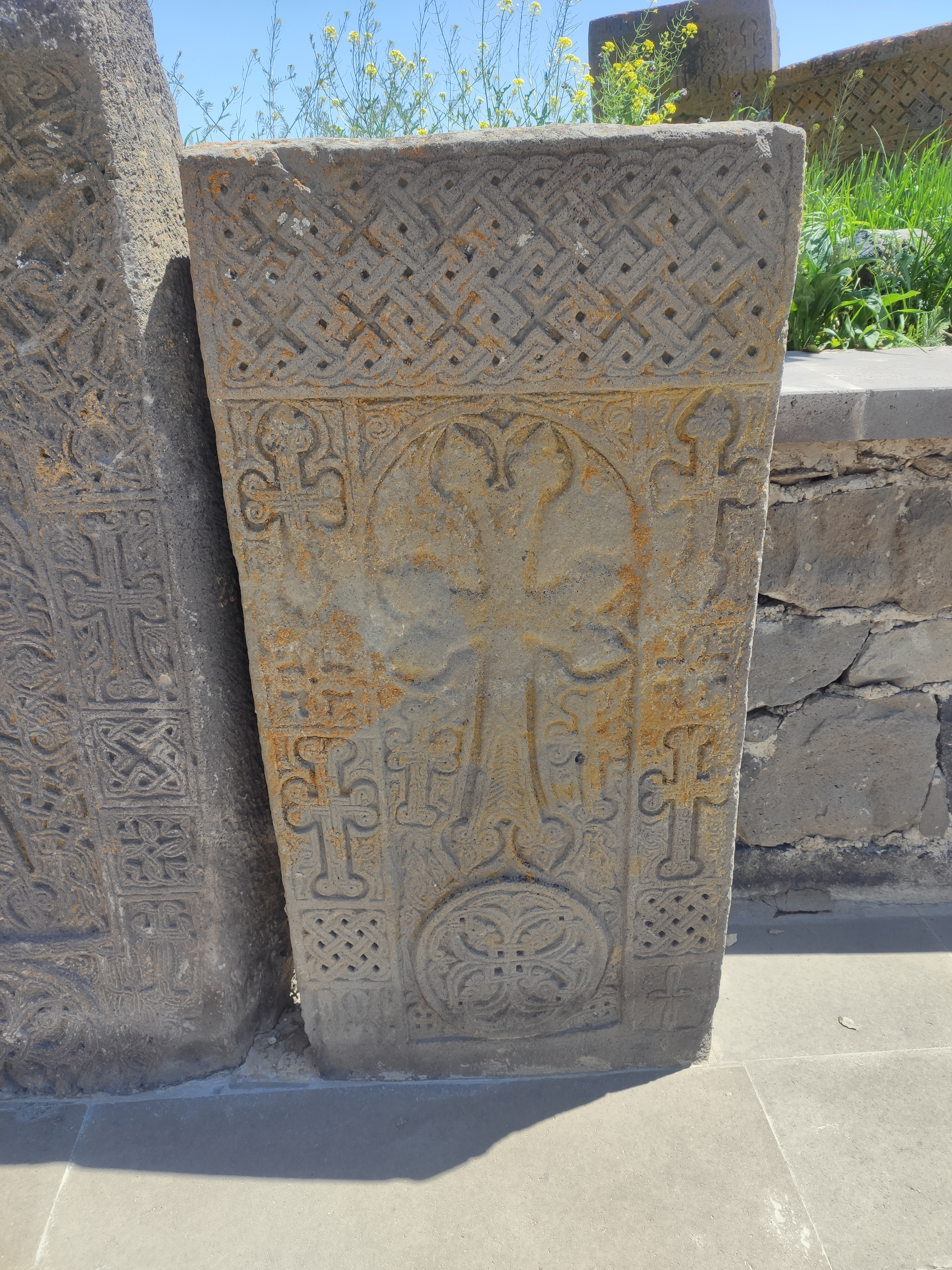

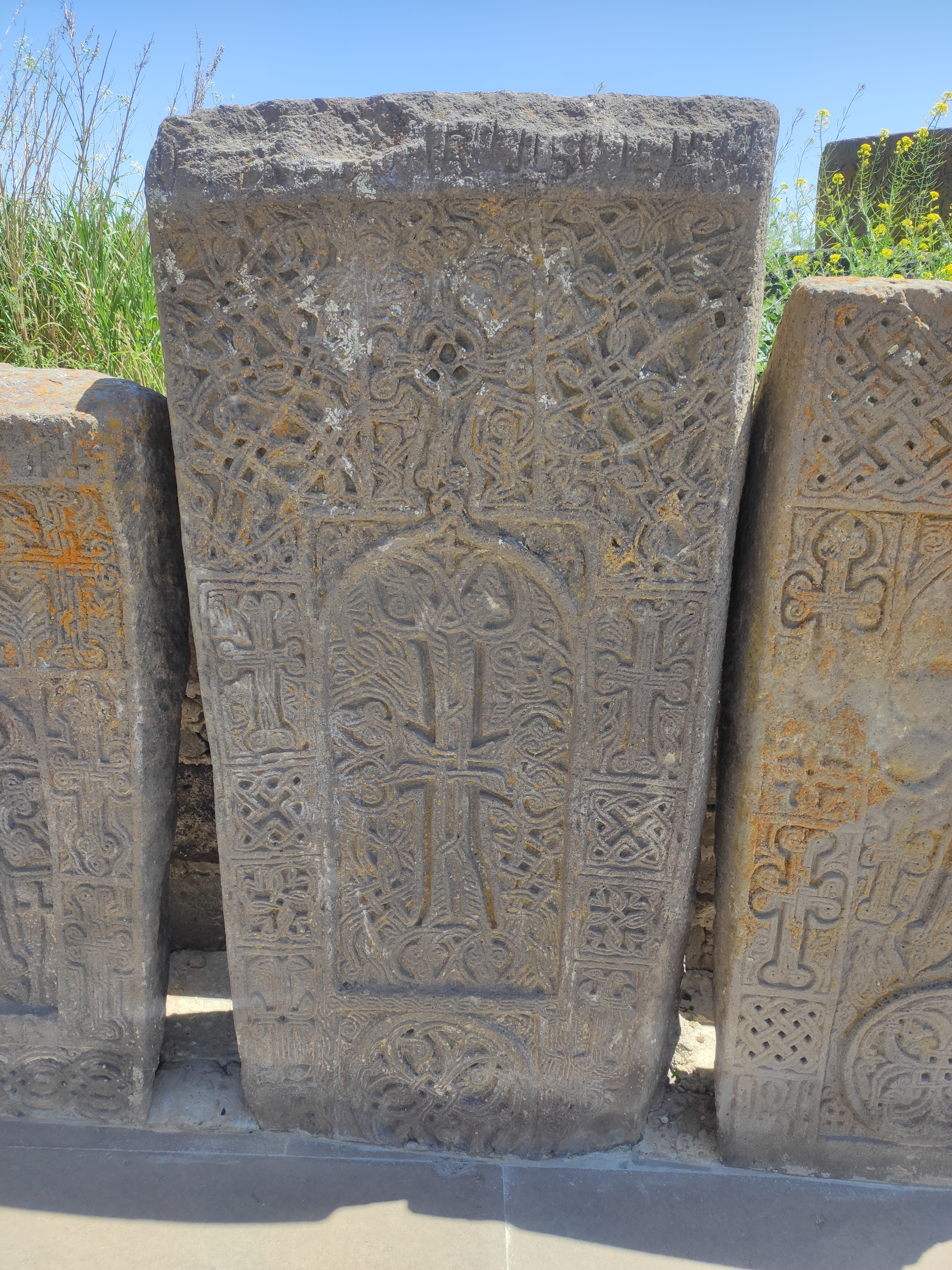

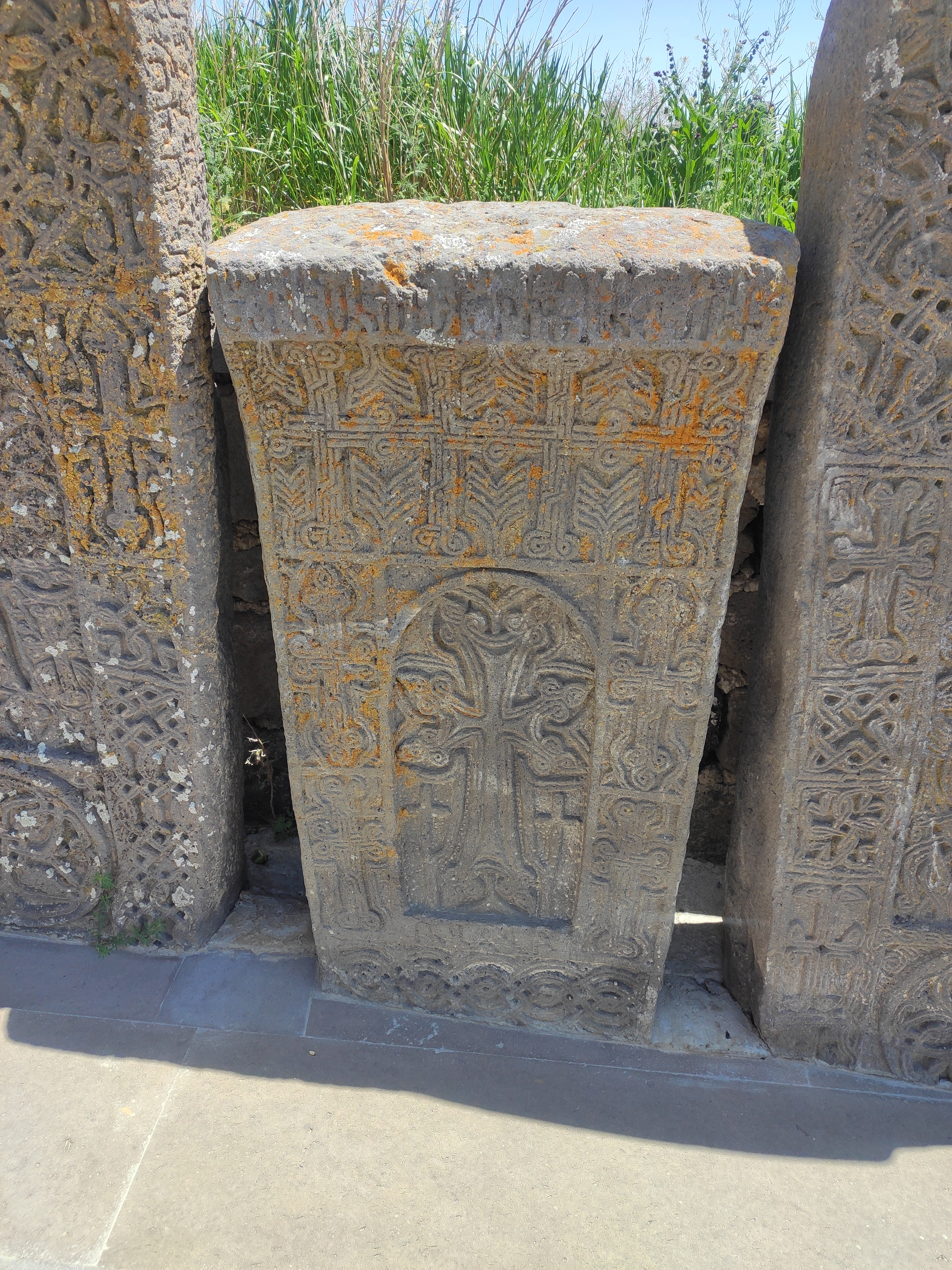

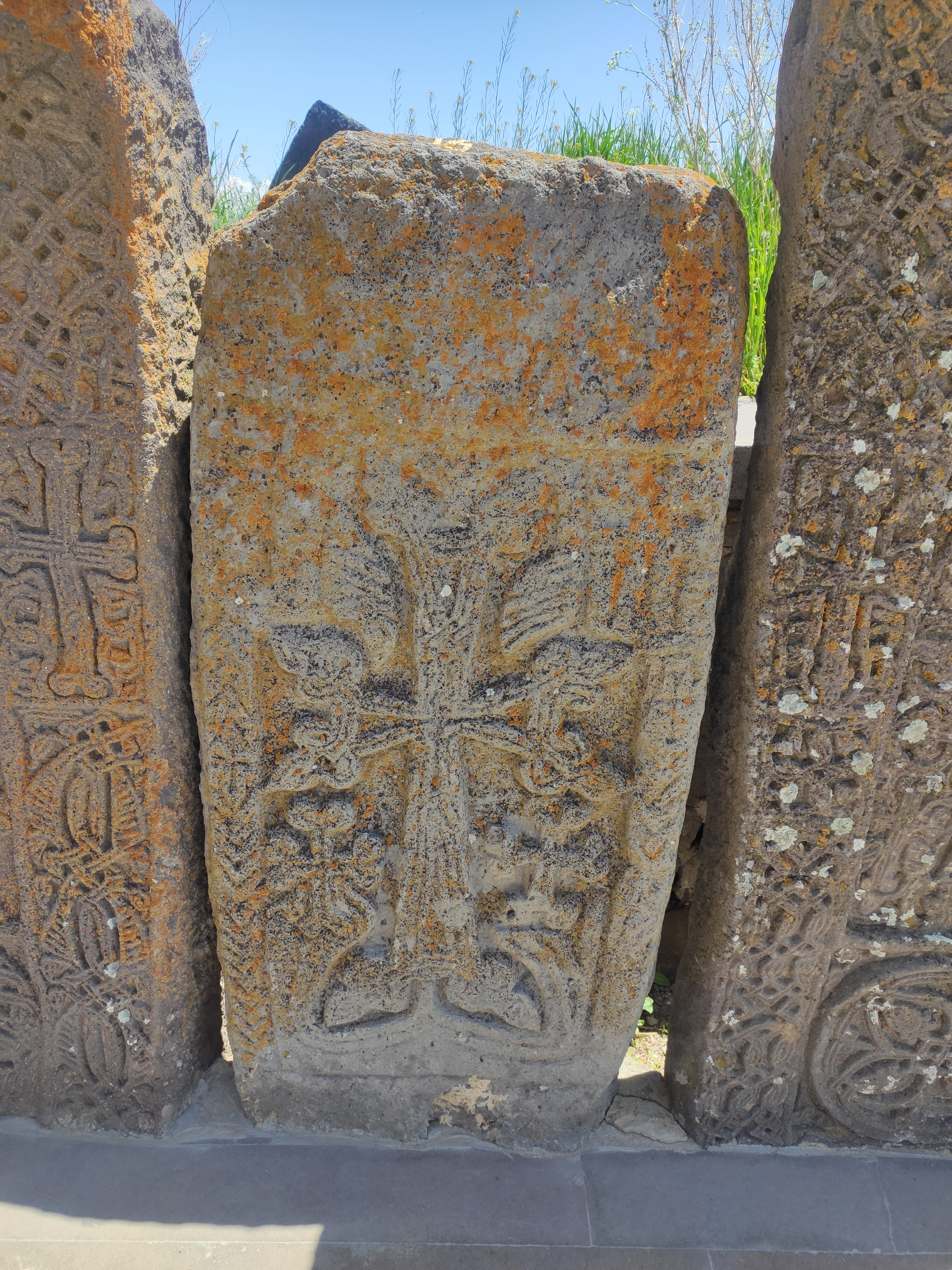

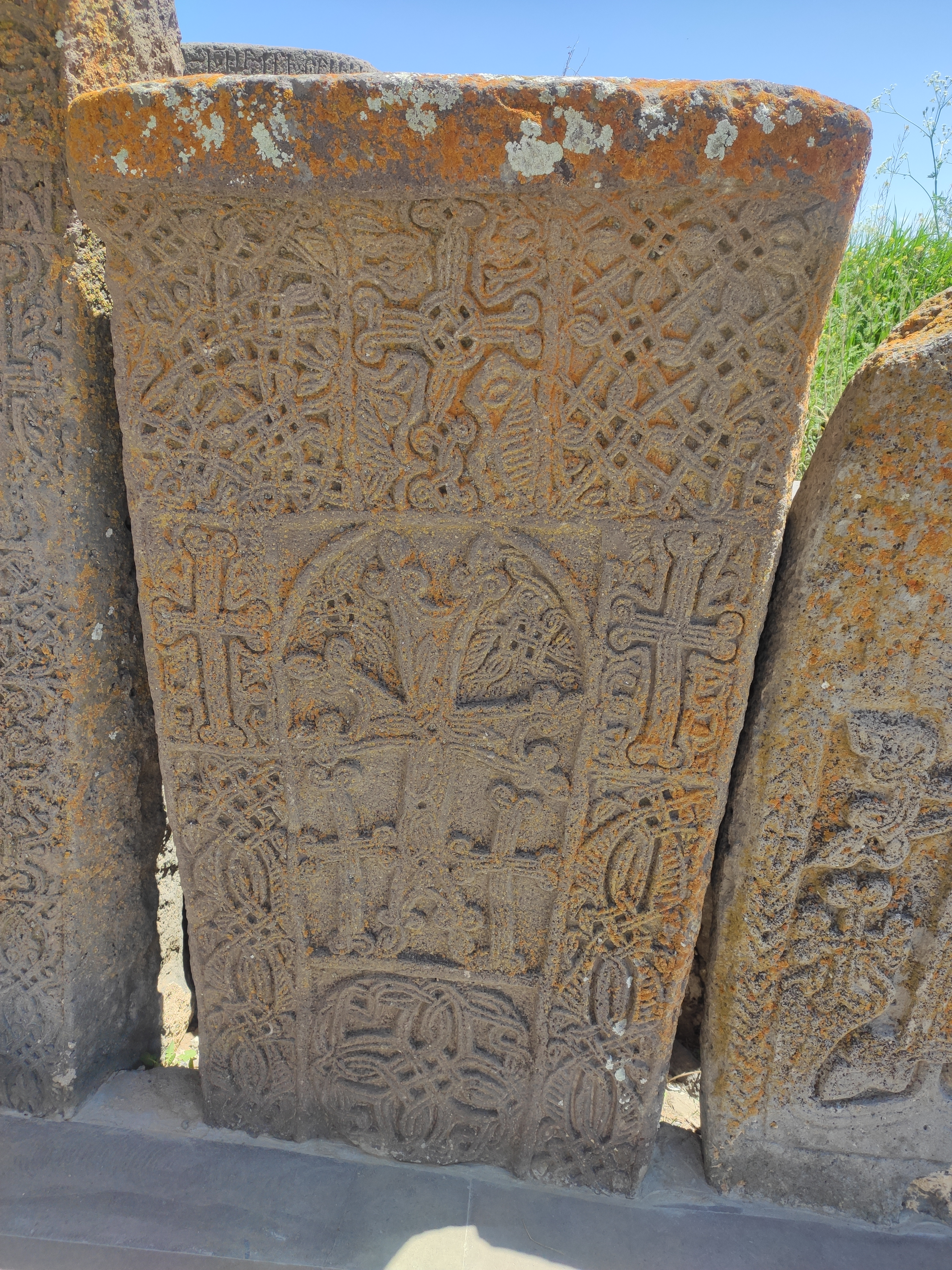

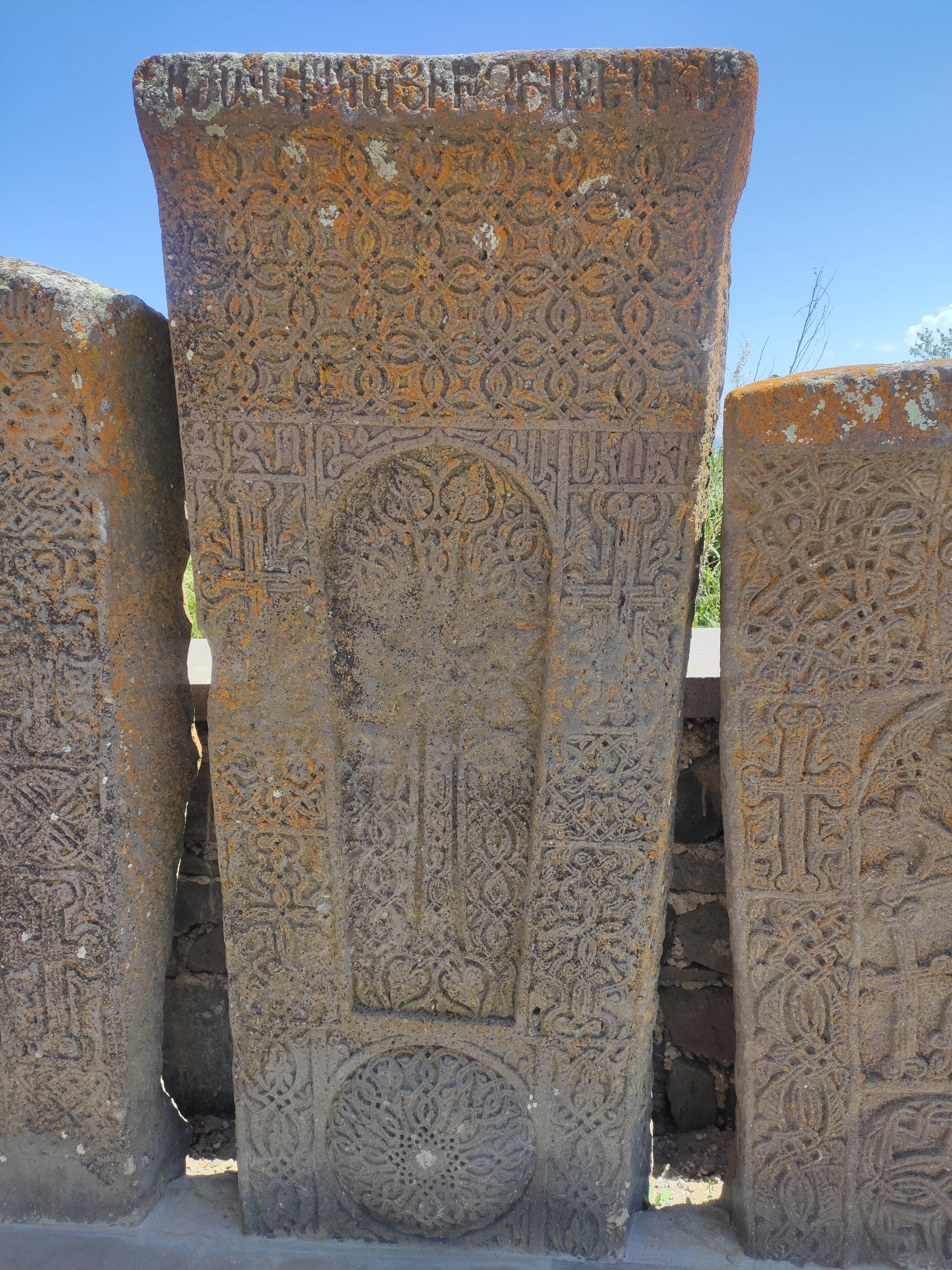

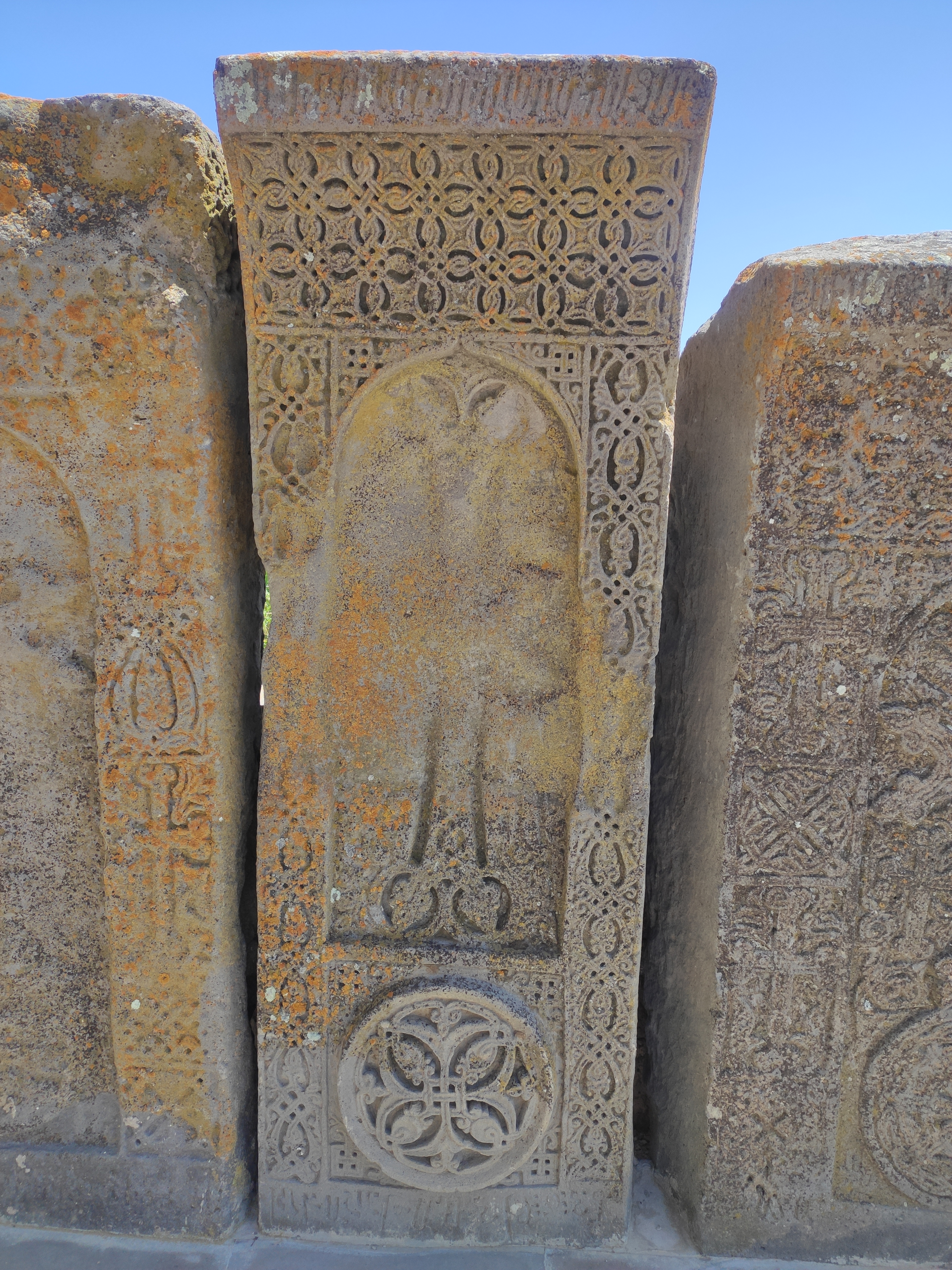

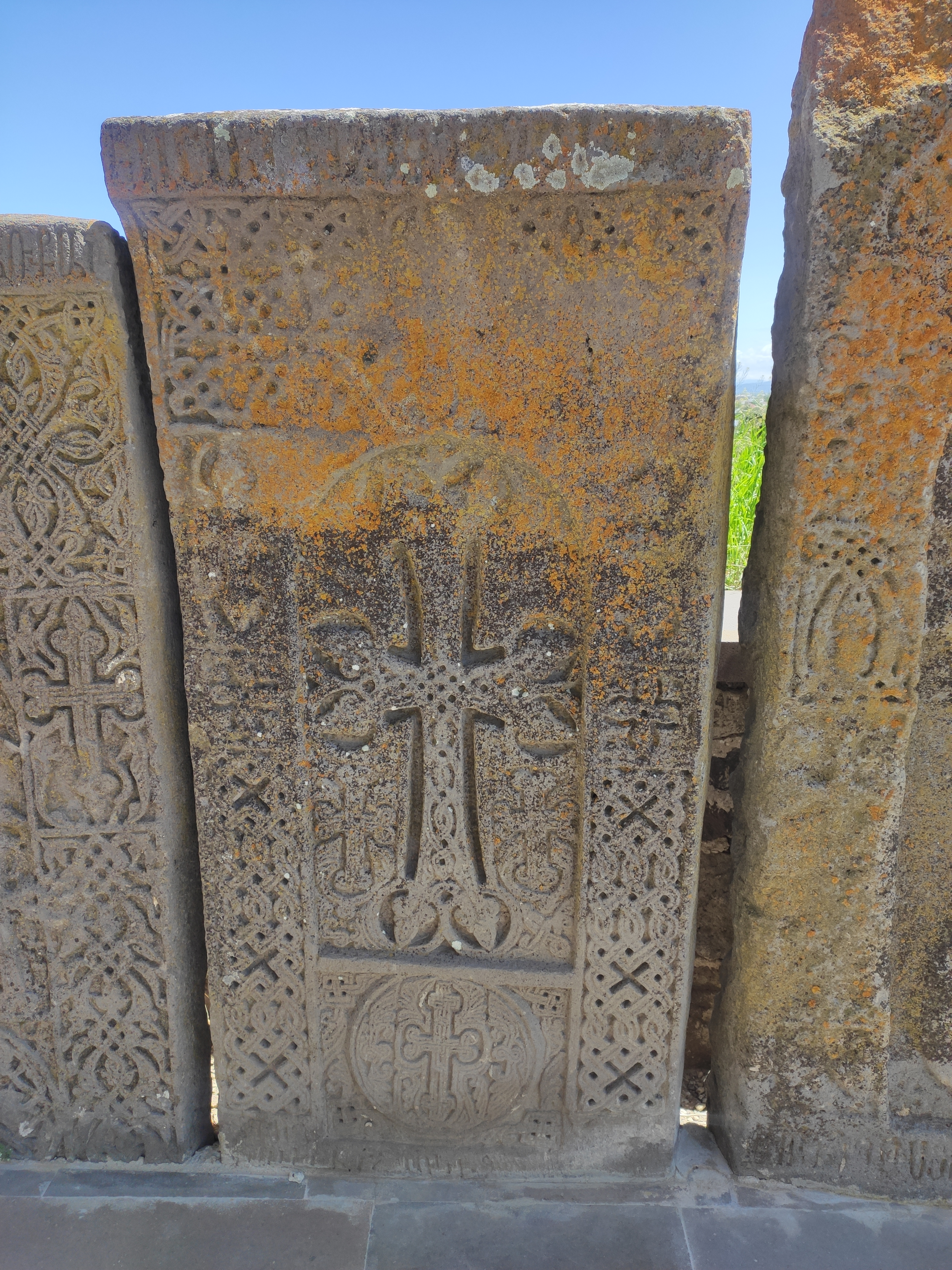

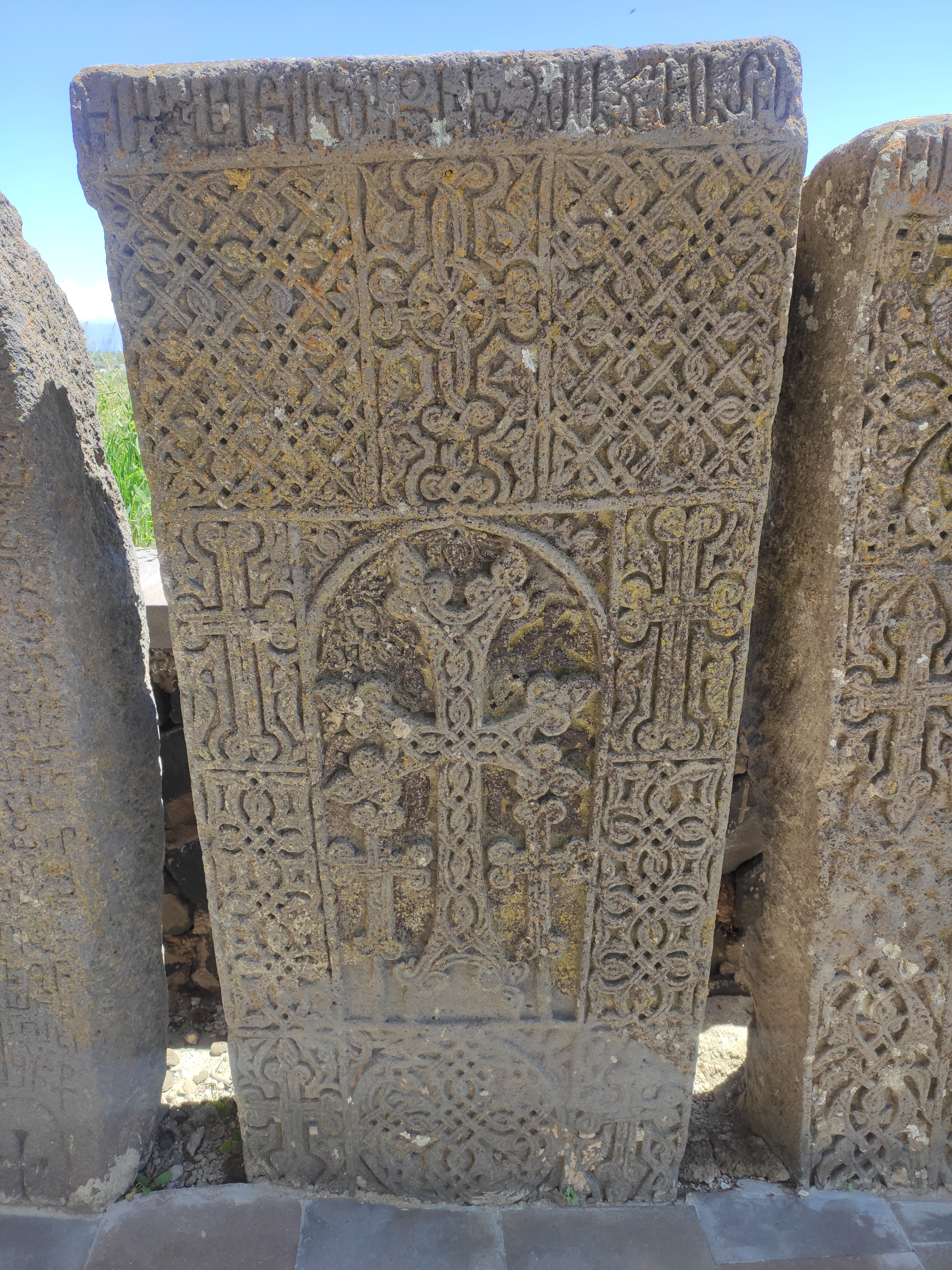

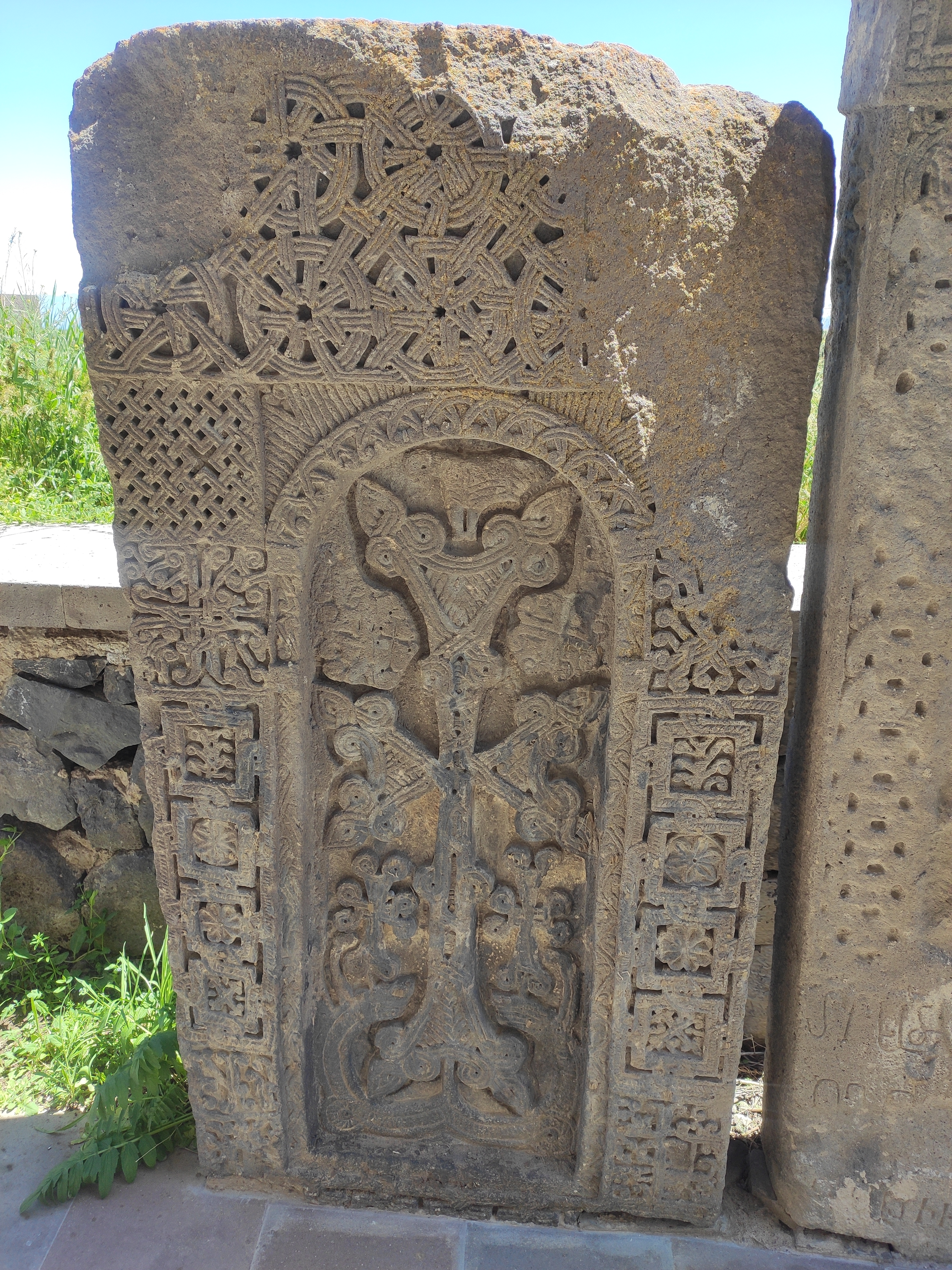
