= Verin Getashen =

Village in Gegharkunik, Armenia

Verin Getashen Վերին Գետաշեն
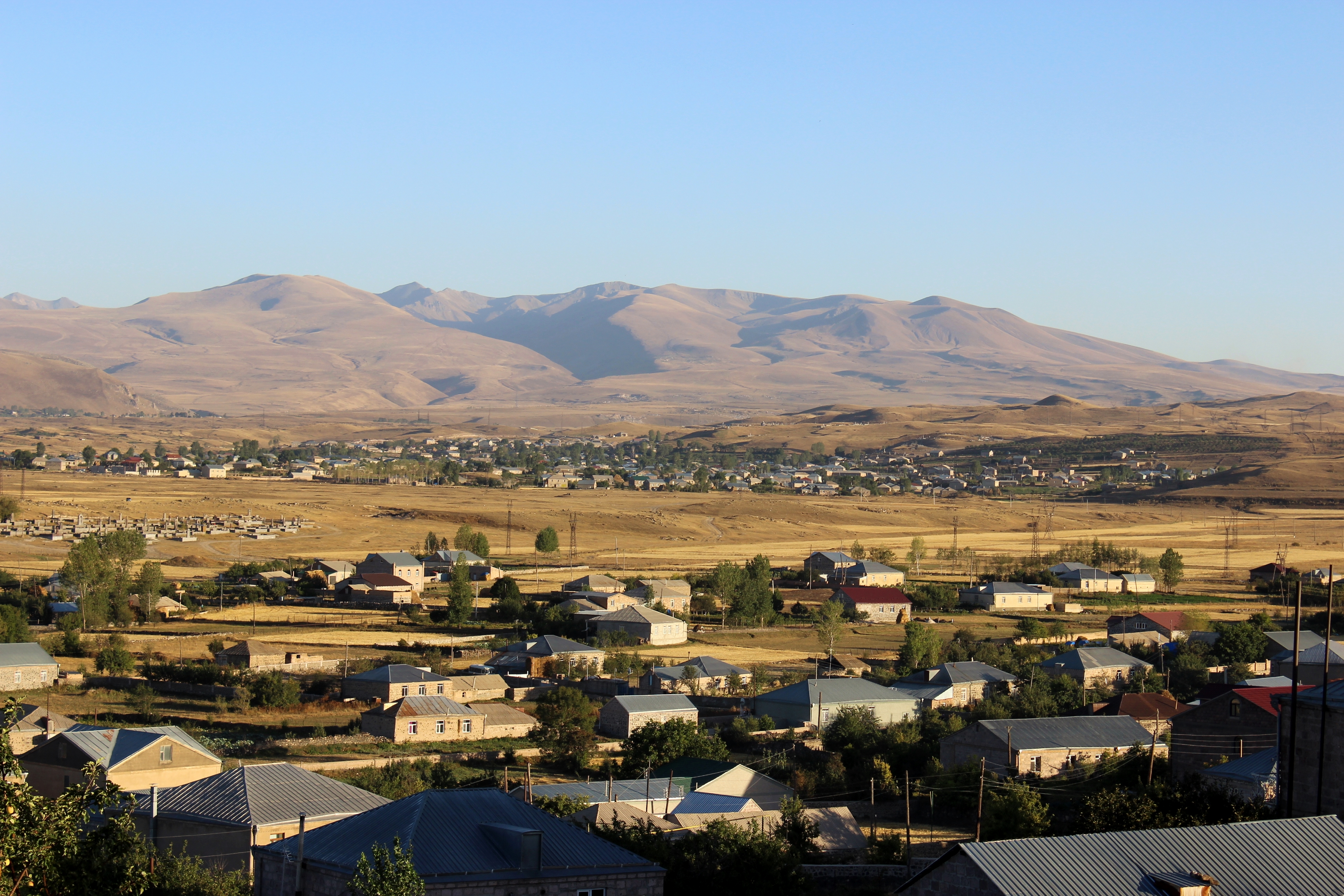
- Verin Getashen seen in the background, as viewed from the hilltop cemetery in Lichk, September 2014

- Location within Armenia Location within Gegharkunik
- Coordinates: 40°07′58″N 45°14′55″E
- Country: Armenia
- Province: Gegharkunik
- Municipality: Martuni
- Founded: 1828-29

Area
  - Total: 2.66 km^{2} (1.03 sq mi)
- Elevation: 1,976 m (6,483 ft)

Population (2011)
  - Total: 5,010
  - Density: 1,880/km^{2} (4,880/sq mi)
- Time zone: UTC+4 (AMT)
- Postal code: 1415

Verin Getashen (Armenian: Վերին Գետաշեն, lit. 'Upper Getashen') is a village in the Martuni Municipality of the Gegharkunik Province of Armenia, located just southwest of Lake Sevan. The village lies to the south of Nerkin Getashen. The village contains the St. Astvatsatsin and the St. Sargis churches.

== History ==
The village was founded 1828-29 by migrants from Mush and Alashkert, in present-day Eastern Turkey.
