= Nerkin Getashen =

Village in Gegharkunik, Armenia

Nerkin Getashen Ներքին Գետաշեն
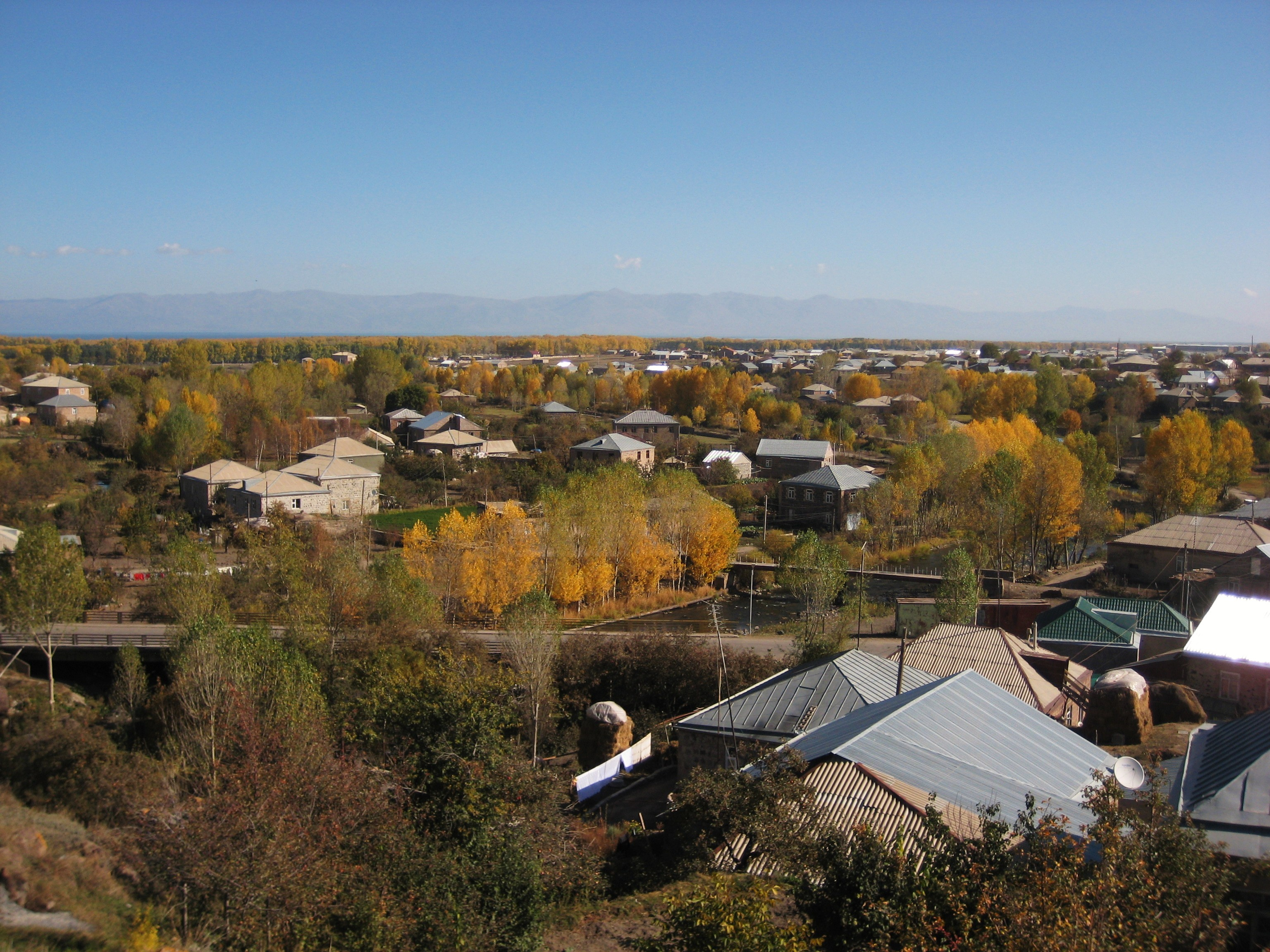
- A view of Nerkin Getashen

- Location within Armenia Location within Gegharkunik
- Coordinates: 40°08′48″N 45°15′51″E
- Country: Armenia
- Province: Gegharkunik
- Municipality: Martuni

Government
  - Mayor: Karo Gevorgyan
- Elevation: 1,948 m (6,391 ft)

Population (2011)
  - Total: 8,553
- Time zone: UTC+4 (AMT)
- Postal code: 1414

Nerkin Getashen (Armenian: Ներքին Գետաշեն, lit. 'Lower Getashen') is a village in the Martuni Municipality of the Gegharkunik Province of Armenia, located along the southwestern coast of Lake Sevan. South of Nerkin Getashen lies Verin Getashen (lit. 'Upper Getashen'), founded 1828-29 by migrants from Mush and Alashkert, in present-day Eastern Turkey.

== Etymology ==
The village was known as Nerkin Adyaman and Nizhniy Adyaman prior to 1945.

== History ==
In the village is the 9th-century monastery and church of Kotavank overlooking the village and the Argitchi River with a large cemetery adjacent. Turkic rune inscriptions are located nearby. Within the village is a ruined "Jam" or funeral chapel with khachkars built into its walls, and not far away is a small shrine. An old mill sits along the Argitchi River. There are also two large stone forts from the Middle Ages located two kilometres to the east and three kilometres to the west of the village.

=== Kot ===
In the early Middle Ages, the site of what is now modern Nerkin Getashen served as the capital of the ancient Syunyats region, known at that time as Kot. The settlement was located along the Dvin-Partav historical trade route, which allowed it to become an important 9th-10th century trade center. It also served as a fishery for the medieval Bagratuni Kingdom of Armenia due to the large quantity of trout that were once abundant in the Argitchi River. The written record of Prince Grigor Supan notes that Kot served as the capital of his princedom. Aside from this, there is no further mention of Kot found in his writings. The monastery and church of Kotavank were also erected by Prince Grigor Supan during his reign. Both Kotavank and Kot were partially destroyed by invasions in the 10th-11th centuries and later by an earthquake. After its capture by Turkish invaders, Kot was renamed Adyaman.

== Gallery ==
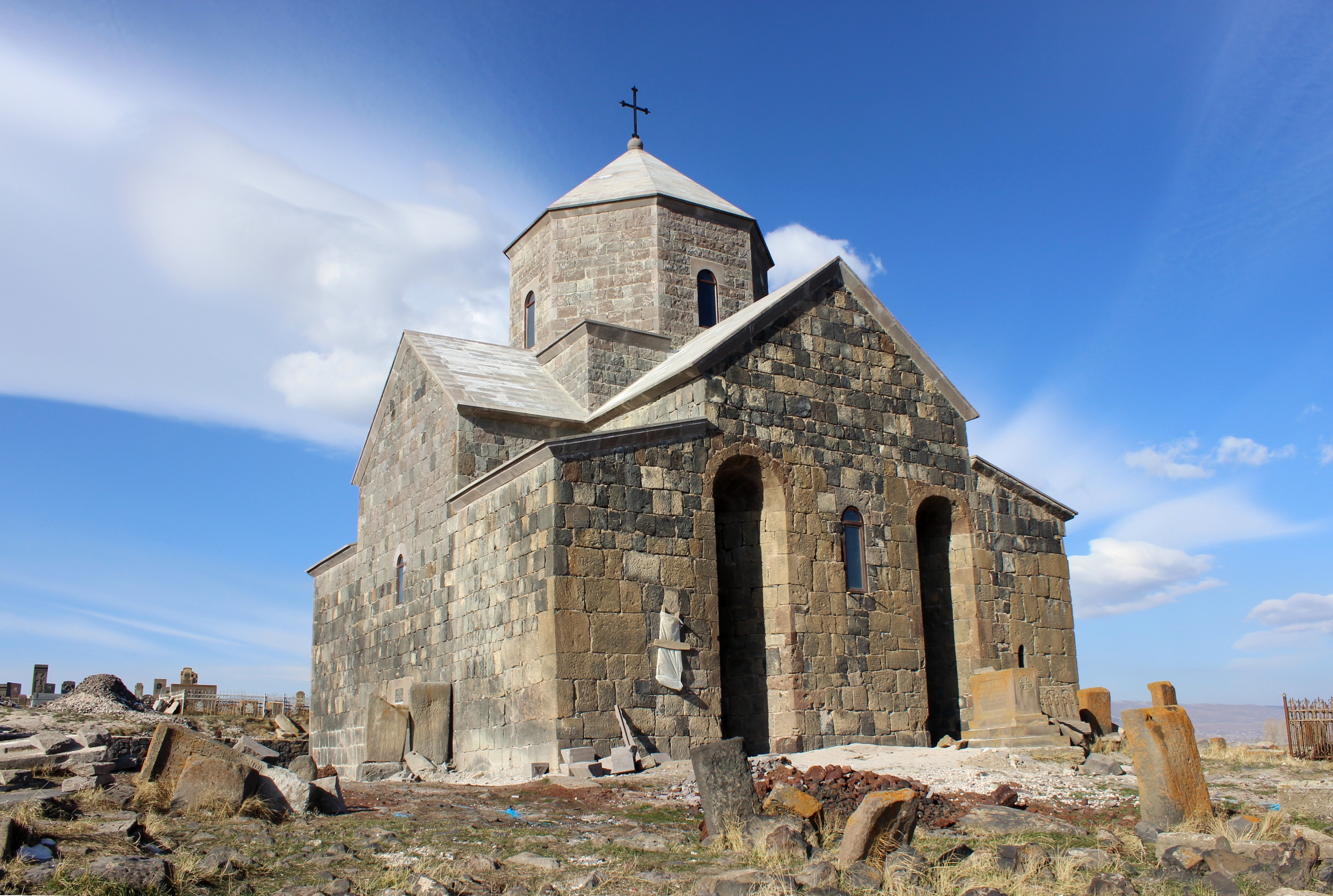
Kotavank (St. Holy Mother Church of Kot) and the adjacent cemetery

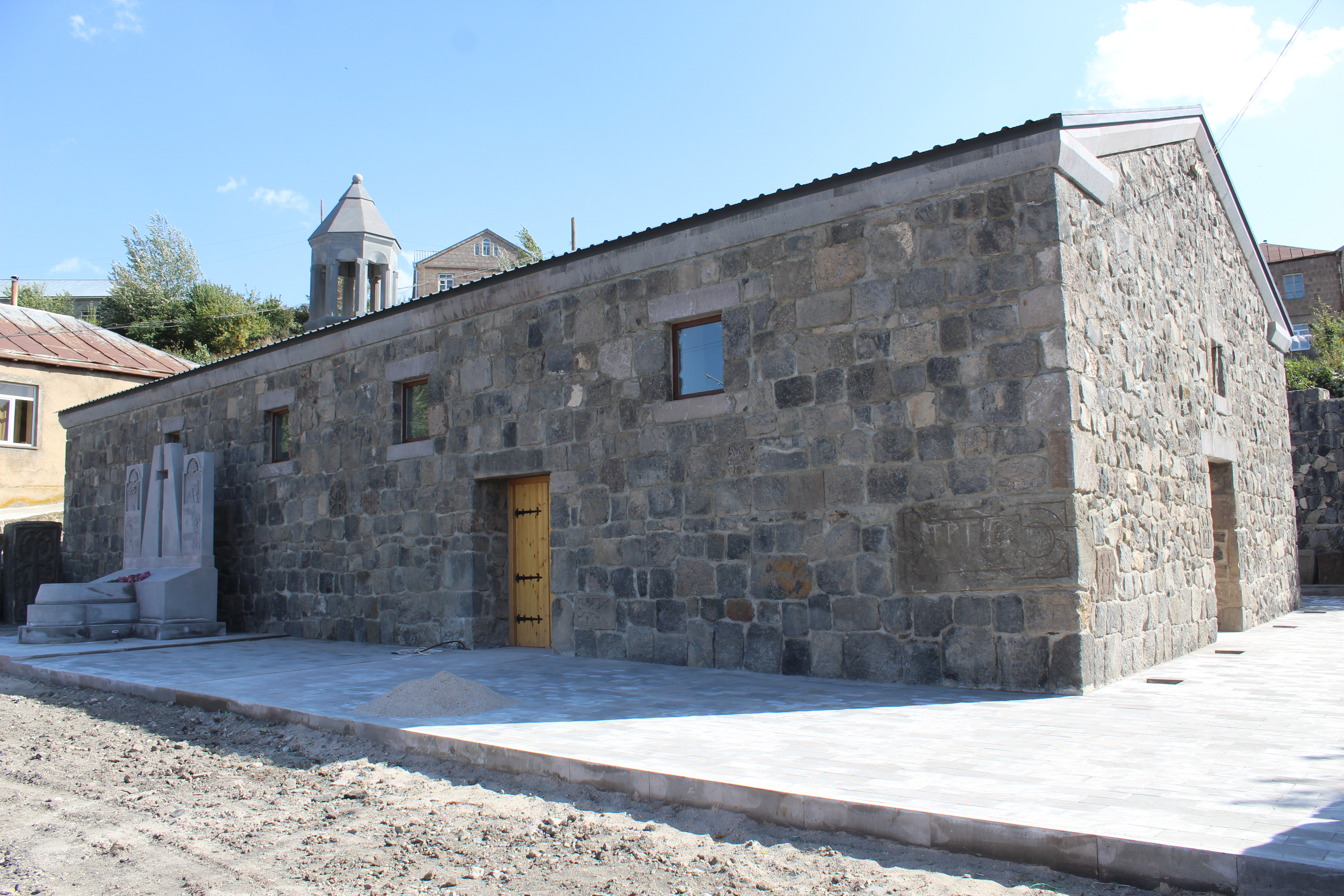
St. Gregory the Illuminator Church (Lusavorich Church)

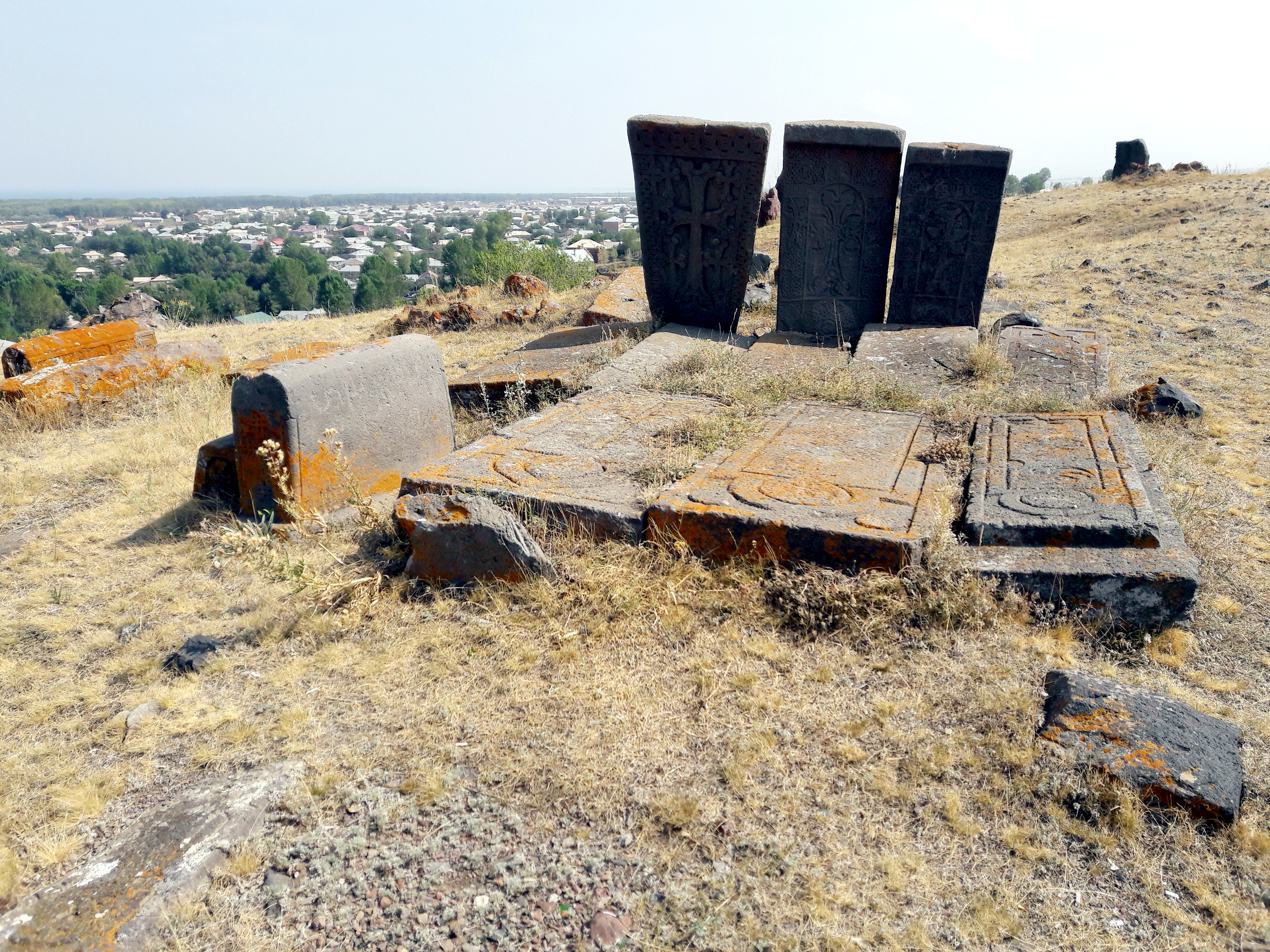
Khachkars and a view of Nerkin Getashen

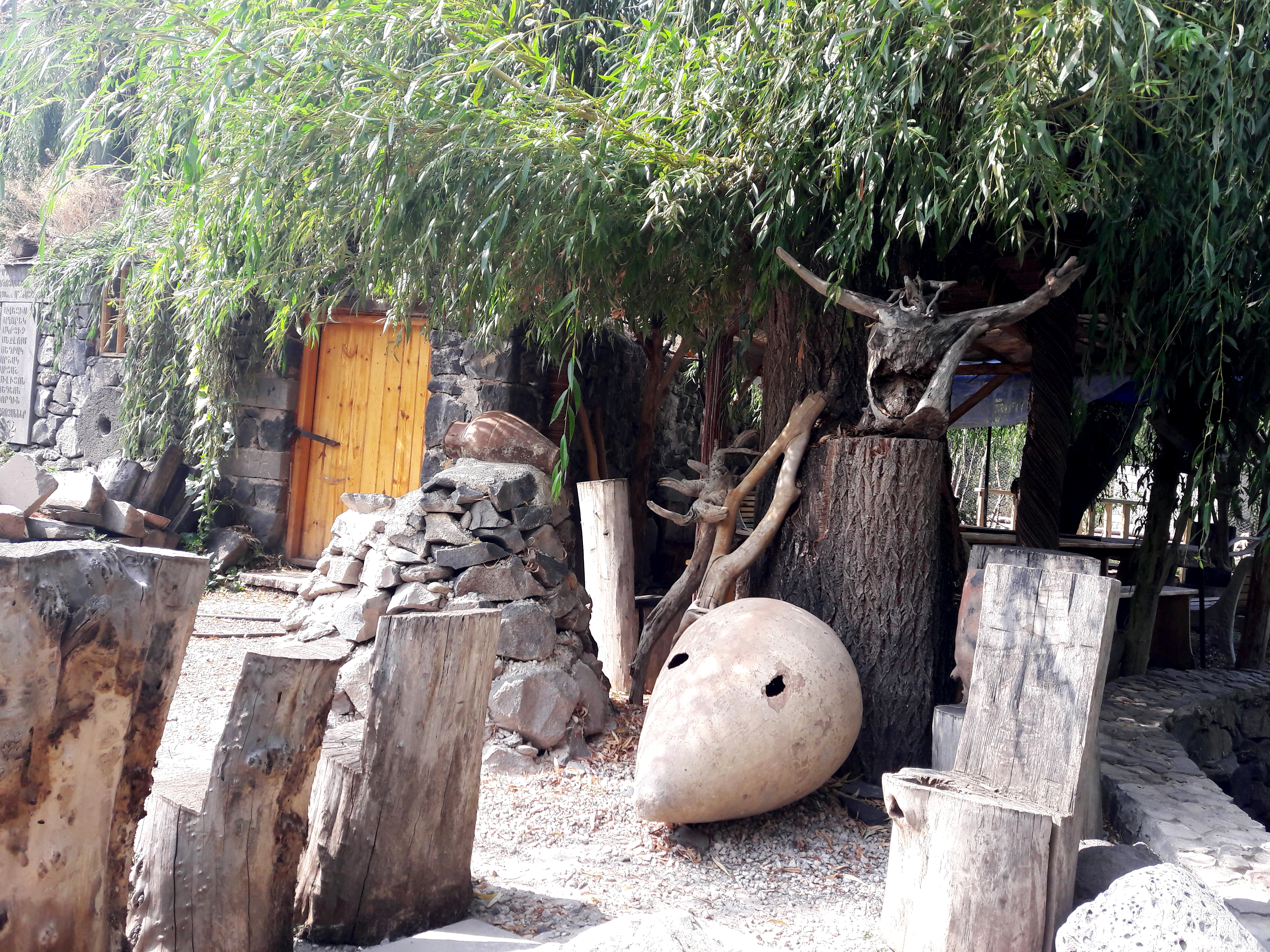
Mill in Nerkin Getashen

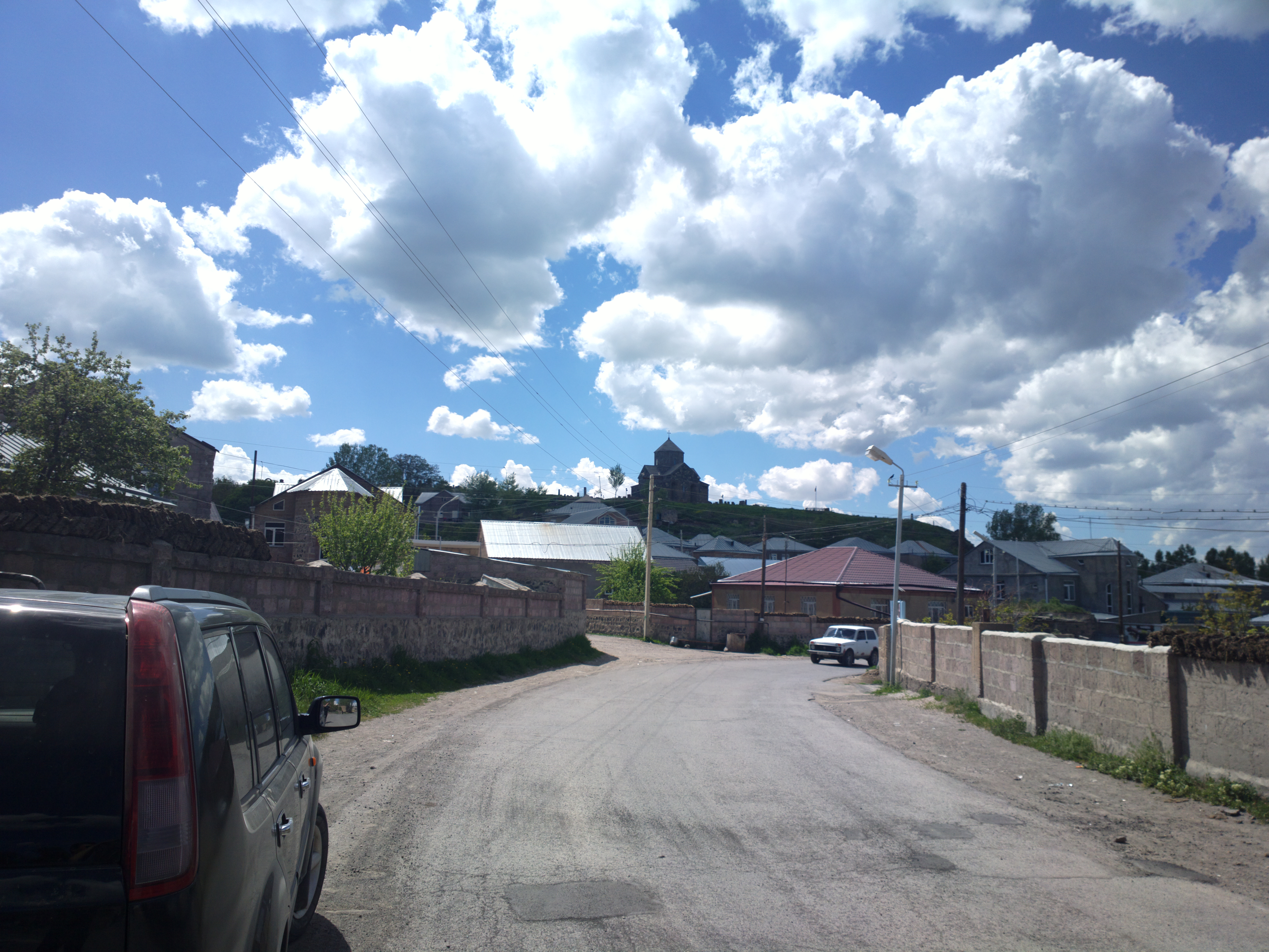
A view of Nerkin Getashen and Kotavank

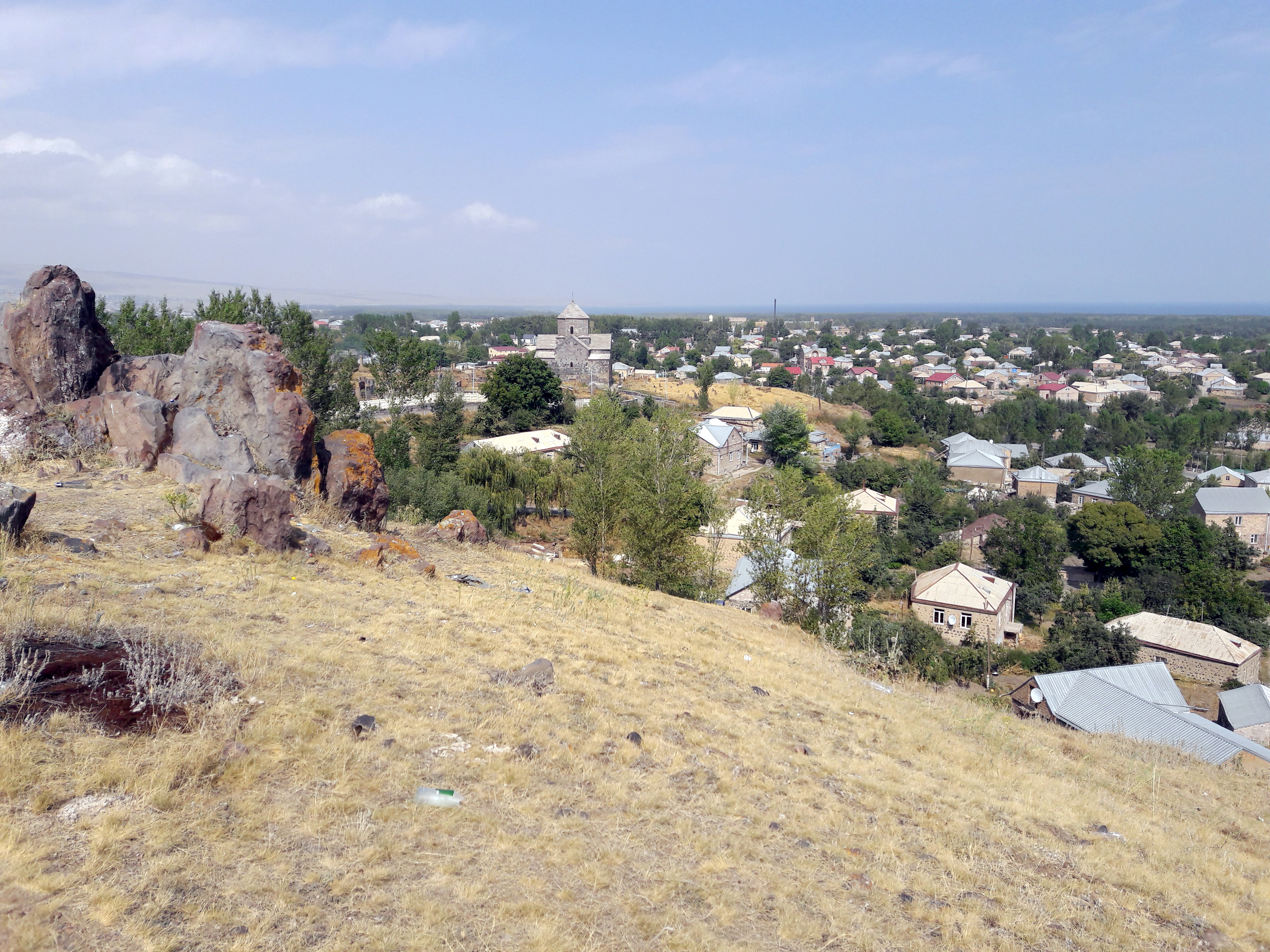
A view of Nerkin Getashen
