= Akob Aghi khachkar =

Memorial stele in Armenia

- Ակոբ Աղի խաչքար
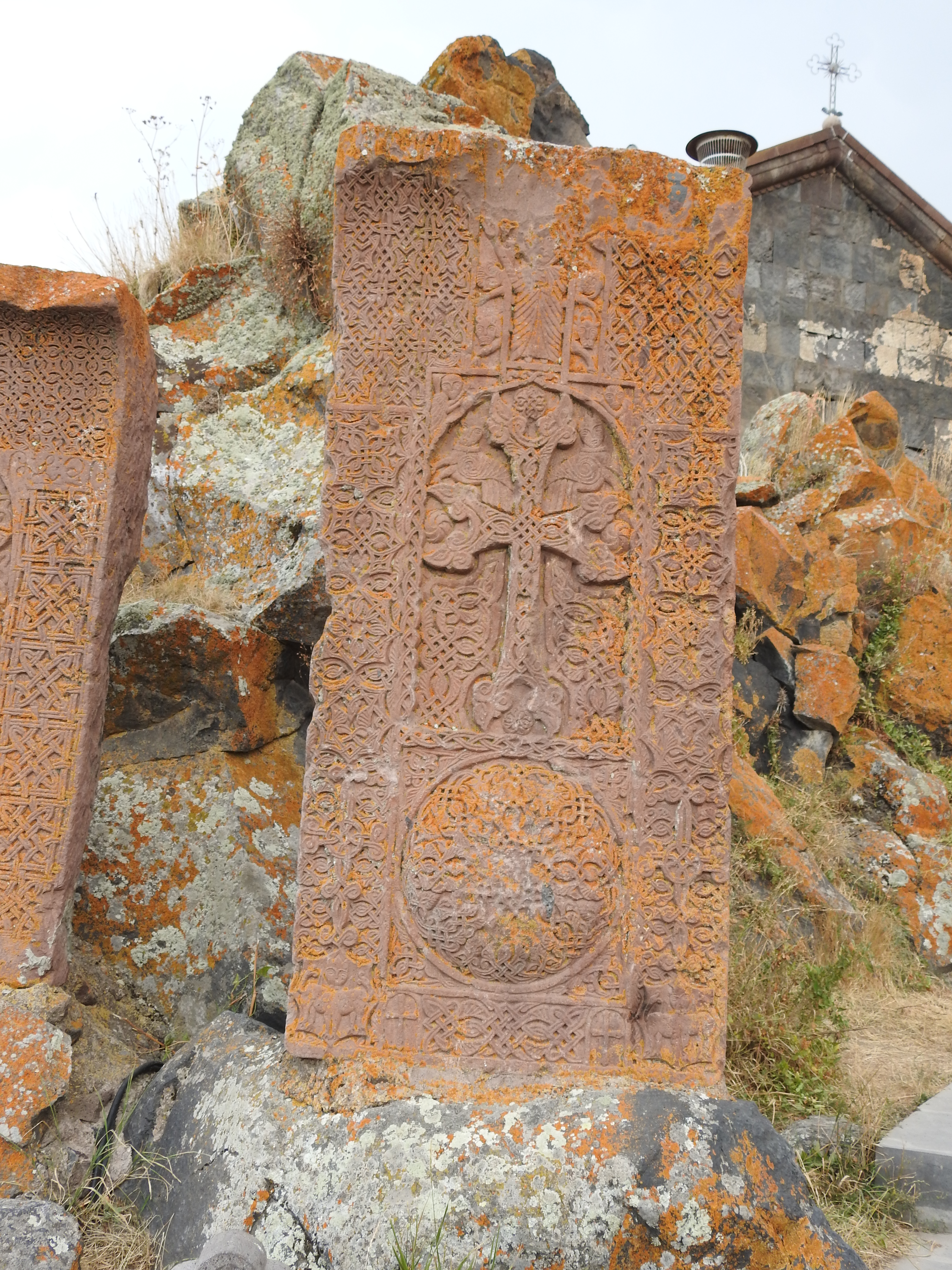
- Hayravank Monastery on the shores of Lake Sevan.

- Location within Armenia

Religion
- Affiliation: Armenian Apostolic Church
- Ecclesiastical or organizational status: Monument of history and culture of Armenia

Location
- Location: Hayravank, Gegharkunik Province, Armenia
- Interactive map of Akob Aghi khachkar
- Coordinates: 40.432728°N 45.107869°E

Architecture
- Architect: Akob Kazmogh
- Type: Khachkar
- Style: Armenian
- Completed: 1541

Akob Aghi khachkar (Armenian: Ակոբ Աղի խաչքար) is a khachkar located just northeast of the village of Hayravank along the southwest shores of Lake Sevan in the Gegharkunik Province of Armenia. It lies in front of the western wall of the Hayravank Monastery complex, on the pedestal; the upper left corner is broken. It is included in the state list of immovable monuments of history and culture of Armenia (5.59/1.1.3.5)։ The khachkar was created by Akob, a 16th-century Armenian sculptor, maker of khachkars and tombstones.

== Location ==
Khachkar is erected in the northeastern part of Hayravank village, in front of the western wall of the Hayravank monastic complex, on a pedestal, the upper left corner is broken.

== Episcopal record ==
Two lines of lithic inscriptions have been preserved on the facade and next to the altar.

1. ... ՁԵՌԱՄԲ ԱԿՈԲ ԱԲԵՂԻՆ
2. ԹՎ :ՋՂ: (1541)

According to the record, the khachkar was built by Akob Kazmogh in 1541.

== Sculptures ==
Khachkar is rich in sculptures; it is possible that there was a sculpture of Adam's head in the central part of the lower sphere, which is characteristic of the style of Gegharkunik khachkar craftsmen.

| # | Image | Name | Additional information |
|---|---|---|---|
| 1 | | Jesus surrounded by the zodiac signs of the four evangelists | In the center of the cross stone cornice is a carving of Jesus Christ, who is standing between two vertical columns. On the sides of Christ's feet are carvings of the Four Evangelists, which are placed in pairs on the outside of the columns. The symbols are presented succinctly, each with one leg and a human arm: Matthew is identified with a man because his Gospel begins with the story of Christ's humanity.; Mark is presented with the symbol of a lion, because at the beginning of his Gospel he boldly declares like a lion that Jesus is the Son of God.; Luke is identified with the ox, which is a symbol of sacrifice, because his Gospel begins with Zechariah's description of the worship of the preparation of the sacrifice in the temple. This story, in turn, was seen as a preparation for Christ's sacrifice.; John is represented by the symbol of the eagle because he soars at the beginning of his Gospel proclaiming the divinity of Christ. |
| 2 | | Two figures praying | Sculpted on a semi-cylinder with an arched projection inscribed in the rectangular altar (consisting of two images of serpents wrapped around each other), one human figure rests on the right and left with arms outstretched in prayer position, looking in each other's direction. The one on the left is bald, bearded and has a pointed top, the one on the right is bareheaded, has luxuriant hair and a beard. It is believed that the apostles Paul and Peter were sculpted։ |
| 3 | | Figures with two human heads and the body of a bird | On the three-leaved ends of the horizontal wings of the cross, the sculptures of memorials bearing a three-pronged pointed crown hang. They have two paws on the front part, and the back part is closed with bird's wings. They look in the opposite direction։ |
| 4 | | A one-headed, two-bodied mythical figure | It is carved in the lower left part of the borders of the khachkar. It has two quadruped bodies, united by one human head. The animals are winged, and their tails rise up like snake-dragons. The anthropomorphic head wears a pointed crown similar to the crown of the souvenirs and has a bifurcated beard։ |
| 5 | | A one-headed, two-bodied mythical figure | It is carved in the lower right part of the borders of the khachkar. It has two quadruped bodies, united by one human head. The animals are winged, and their tails rise up like snake-dragons. The anthropomorphic head wears a pointed crown similar to the crown of the souvenirs and has a bifurcated beard։ |

== See also ==
- Hayravank Monastery
