= Ayrivan =

Ayirvan may refer to:

- Hayravank, Armenia
- Yerevan, Armenia
