= Hayravank Monastery =

9th to 12th century Armenian monastery

Hayravank
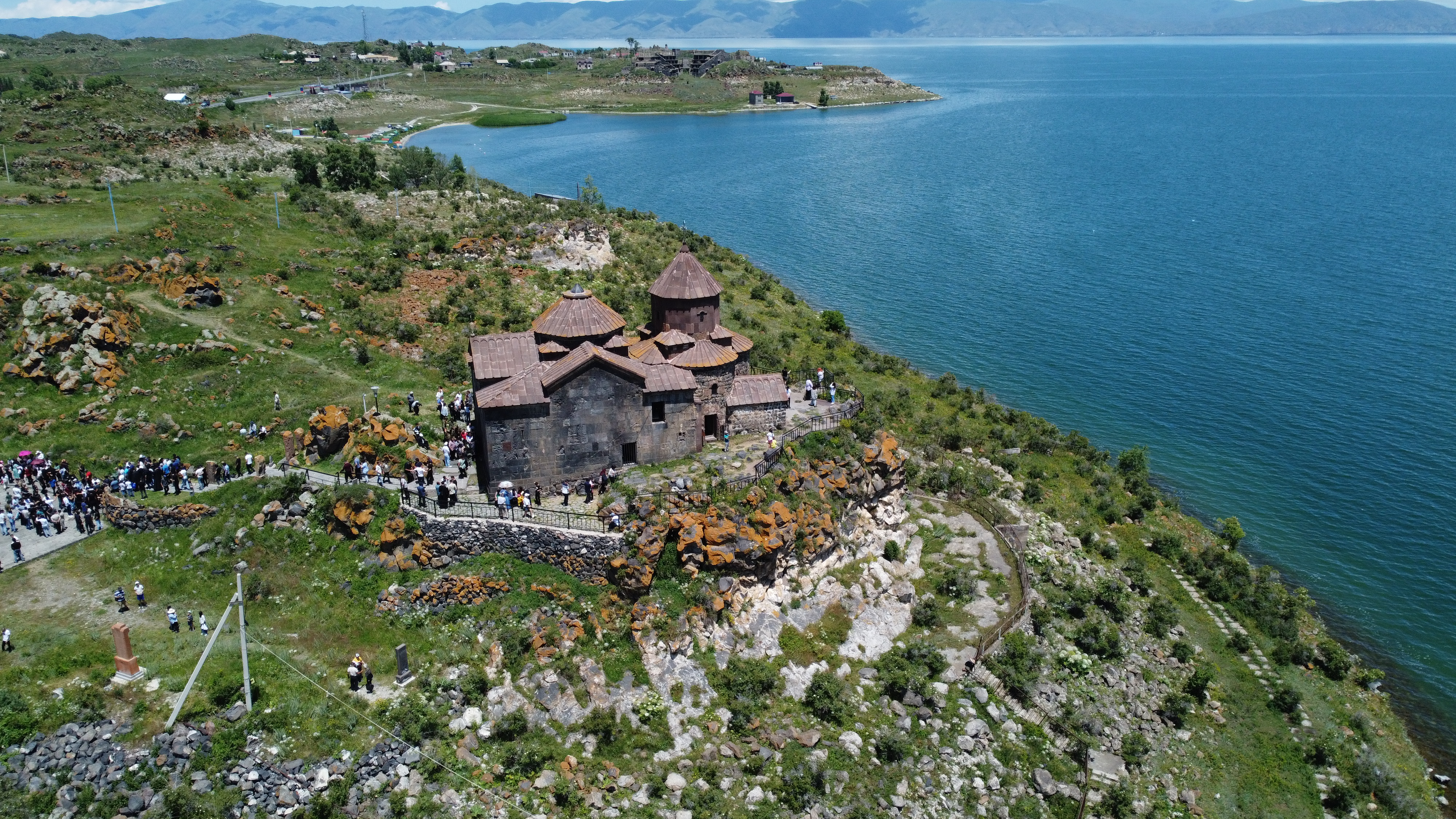
- An aerial view of Hayravank Monastery on the shores of Lake Sevan.

- Location within Armenia Location within Gegharkunik

Religion
- Affiliation: Armenian Apostolic Church

Location
- Location: Hayravank, Gegharkunik Province, Armenia
- Coordinates: 40.432728°N 45.107869°E

Architecture
- Type: Cruciform central-plan
- Style: Armenian
- Completed: 9th-12th centuries
- Domes: 1 dome above the church, 1 cupola above the gavit

Hayravank (Armenian: Հայրավանք) is a 9th to 12th century Armenian monastery located just northeast of the village of Hayravank along the southwest shores of Lake Sevan in the Gegharkunik Province of Armenia. The monastic complex consists of a church, chapel, and gavit. Surrounding the monastery are numerous khachkars and gravestones that are part of a small cemetery.

== Architecture ==
=== Church and Chapel ===
The church at Hayravank was built during the late 9th century. It is a quatrefoil cruciform central-plan structure with four semi-circular apses that intersect to create squinches for the octagonal drum and conical dome to stand above. A small chapel was added in the 10th century, accessed from the southeastern corner of the church. A single portal leads into the church from the gavit, it is believed that this entry was added between the 12th and 13th centuries. There is a second entrance through the church's exterior on its south side. Exterior walls of the structure differ from the construction of the rest of the complex in that rubble masonry has been incorporated into the façade. The original drum and dome had collapsed completely: their current rebuilt form dates from a restoration undertaken between 1977 and 1989.

=== Gavit ===
The gavit is located west of and adjacent to the church and was added in the 12th century. A main portal leads into the structure from the western wall, and has an arched tympanum with a worn inscription located above the lintel. Another portal leads into the gavit from the southern wall. Two thick columns situated at the western half of the building and two semi-columns at the eastern wall support large arches and a cupola above. The cupola consists of a short octagonal drum (only seen from the interior) as well as a short octagonal conical dome above decorated with "Harlequin Patterned" stonemasonry. The pattern alternates with reddish and a lighter grayish colored tufa. This example is considered to be one of the earliest examples of polychrome decorative masonry that was to become widespread in the following centuries in sacred buildings throughout Armenia. An oculus at the peak of the dome lets light into the room below.

== Gallery ==
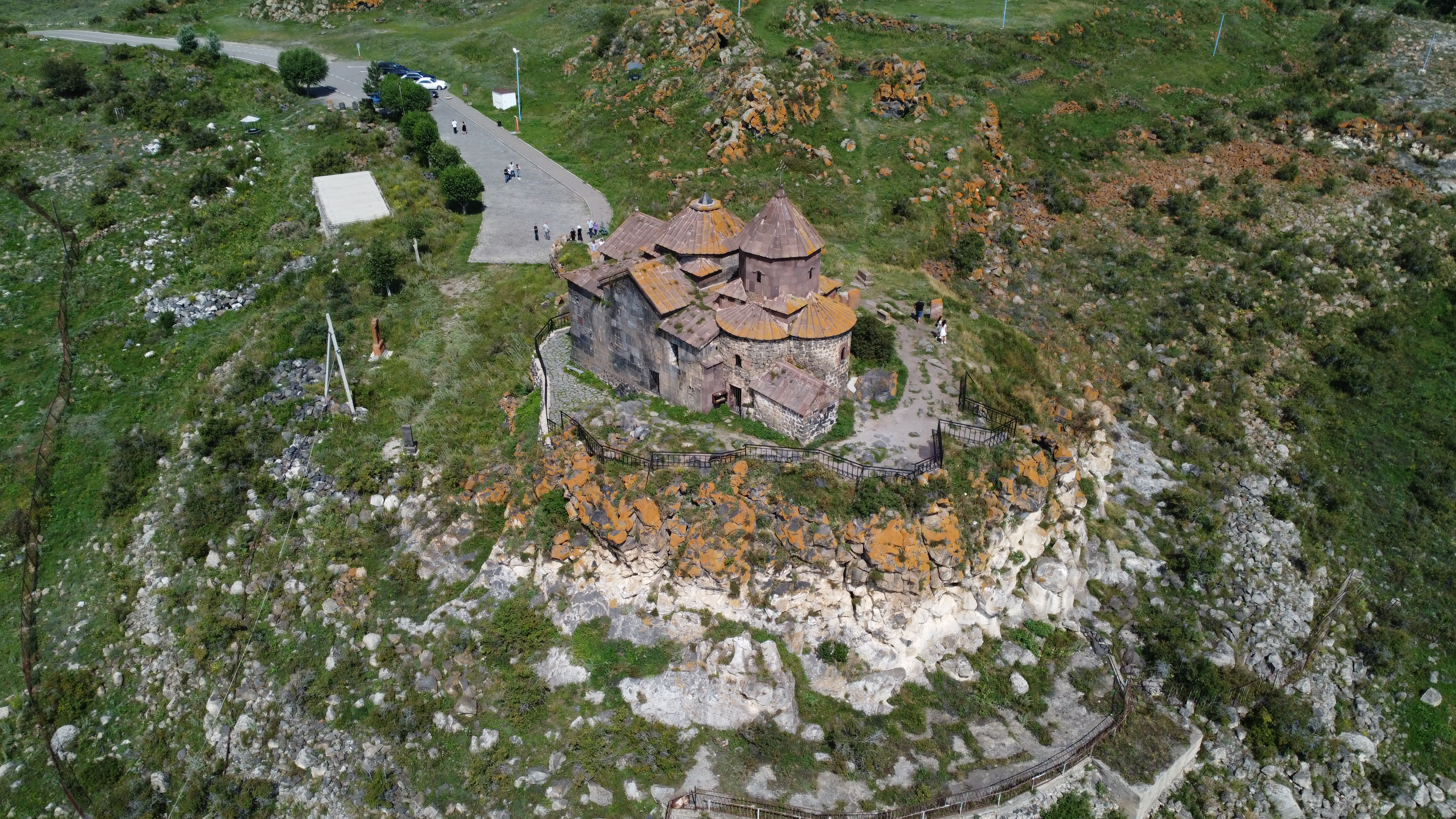

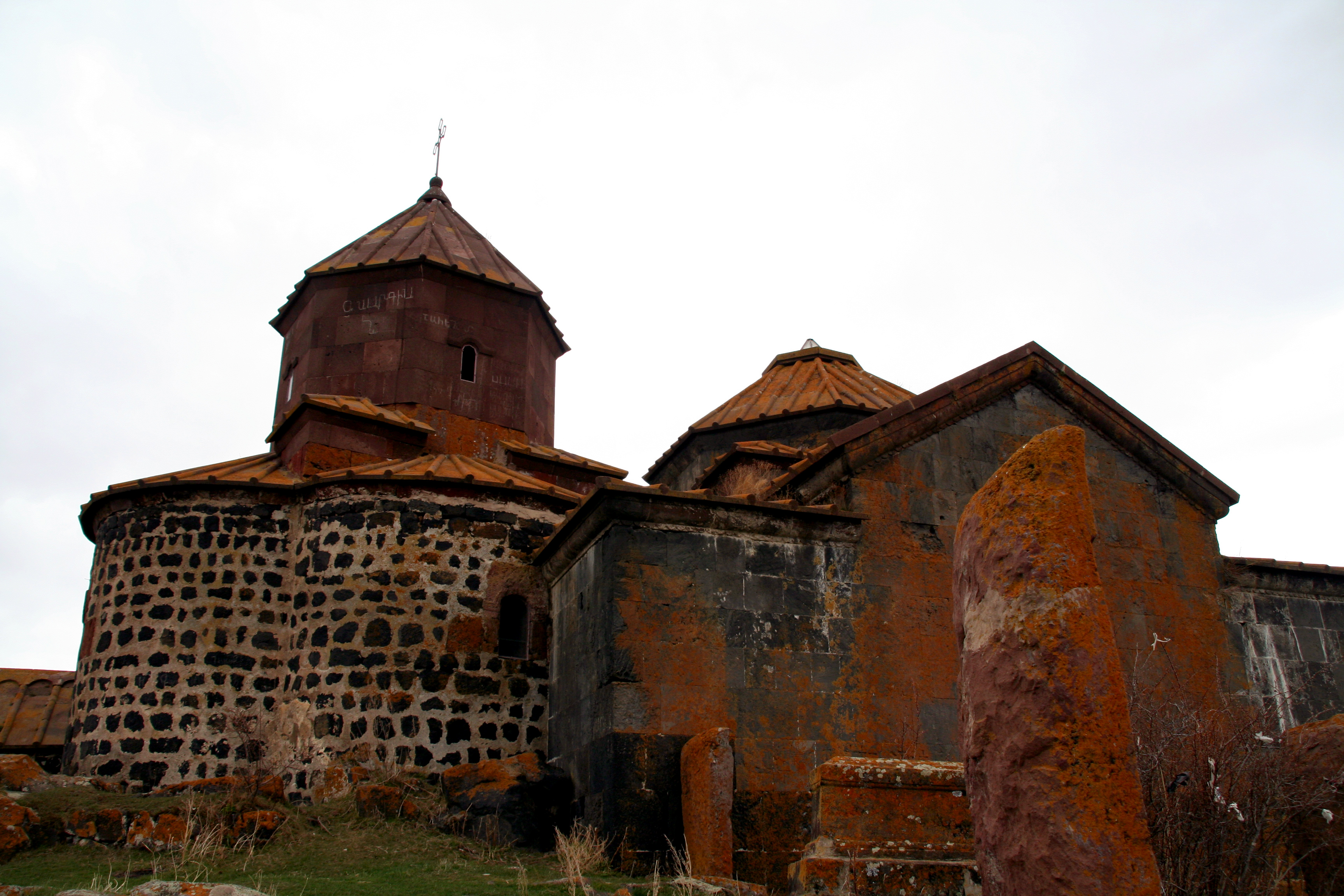
Monastic complex at Hayravank.

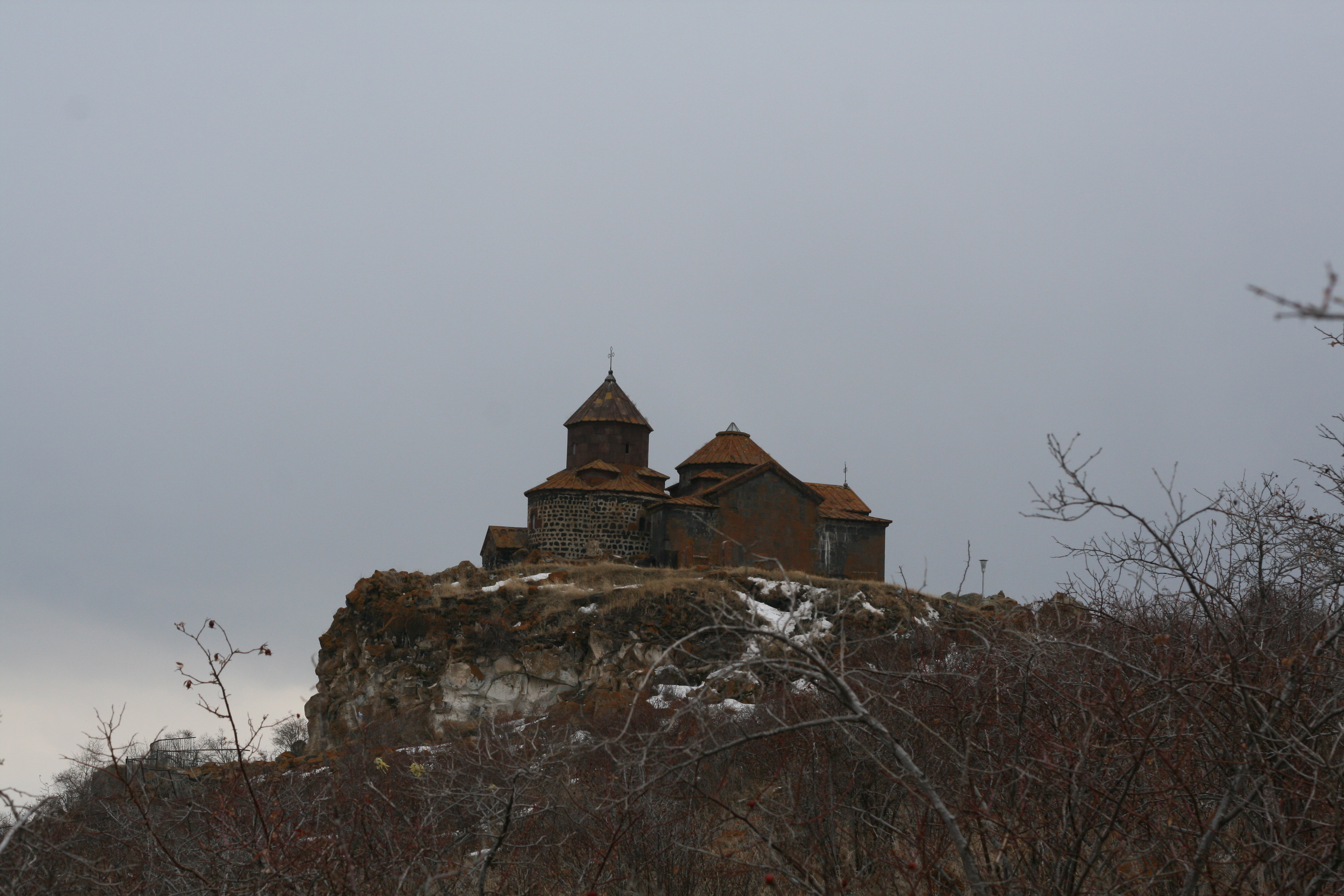

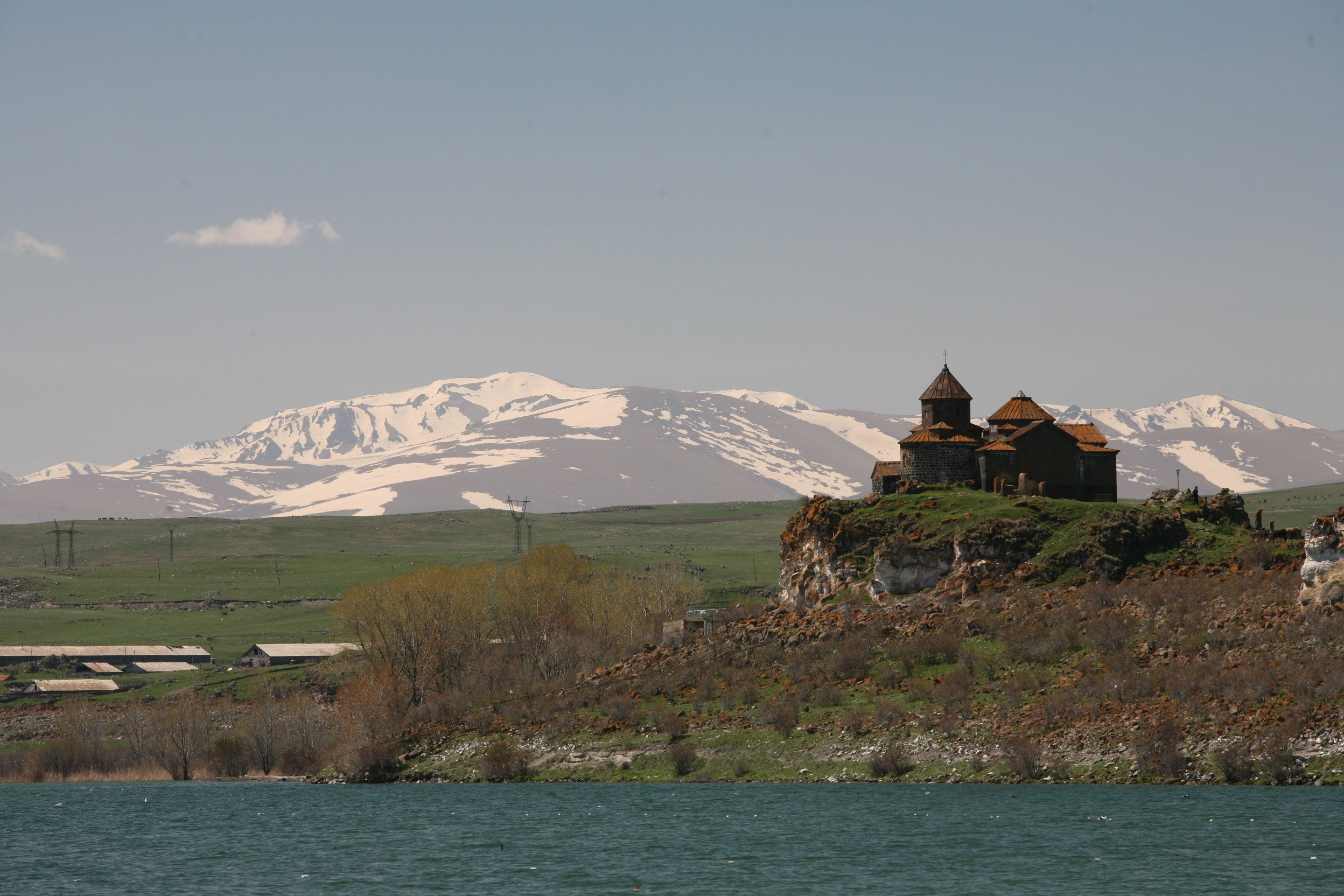

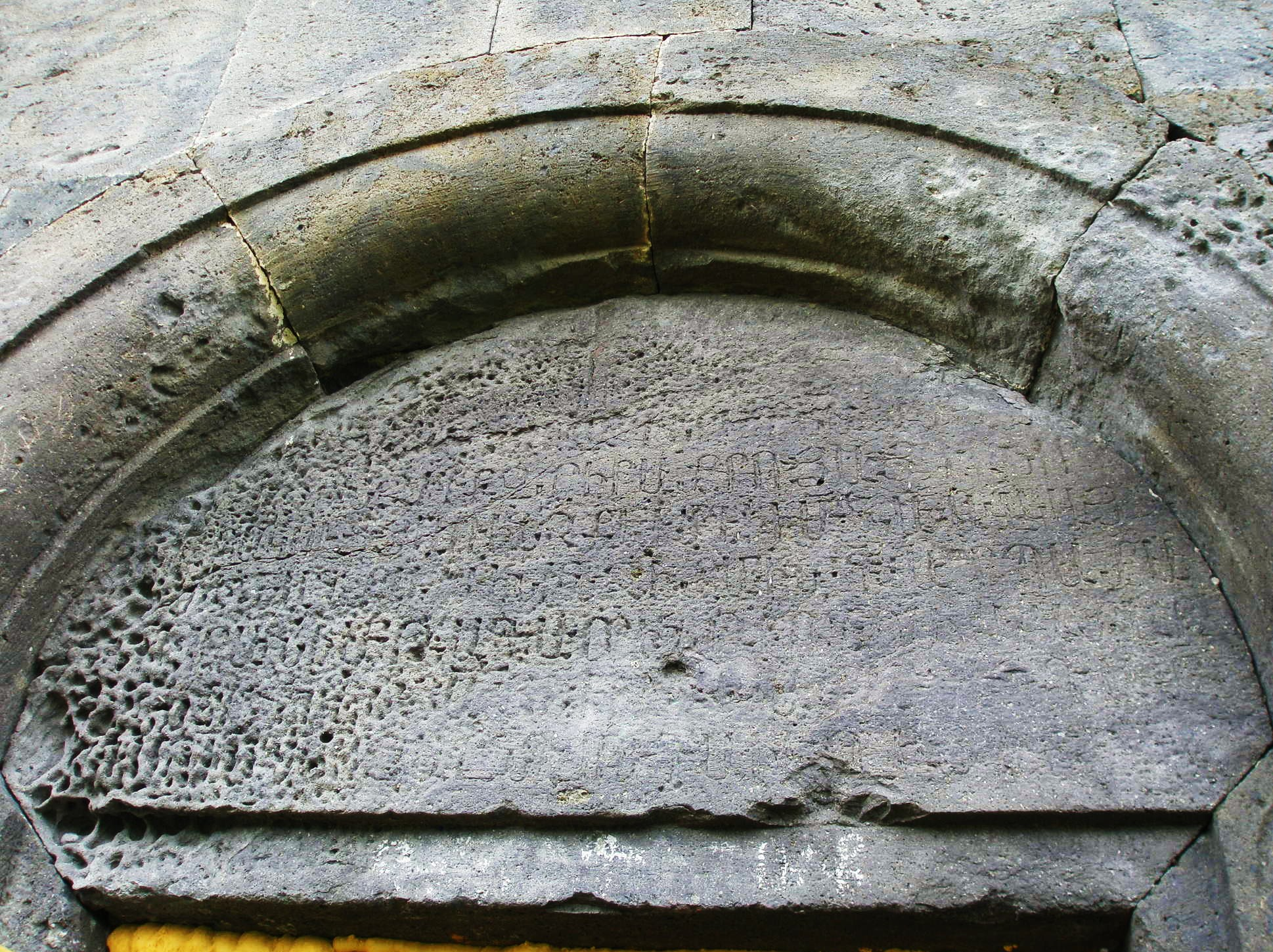
Inscription written upon the tympanum above the western portal to the gavit.

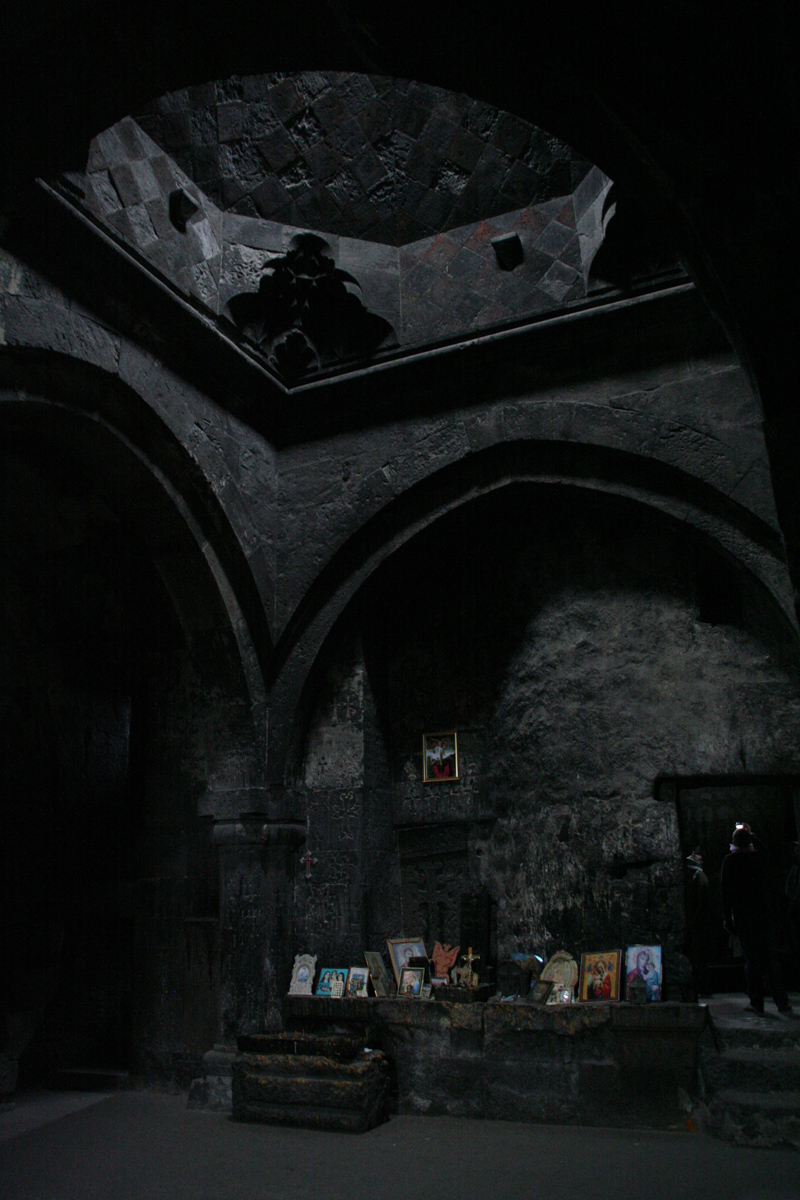
Interior of the gavit.

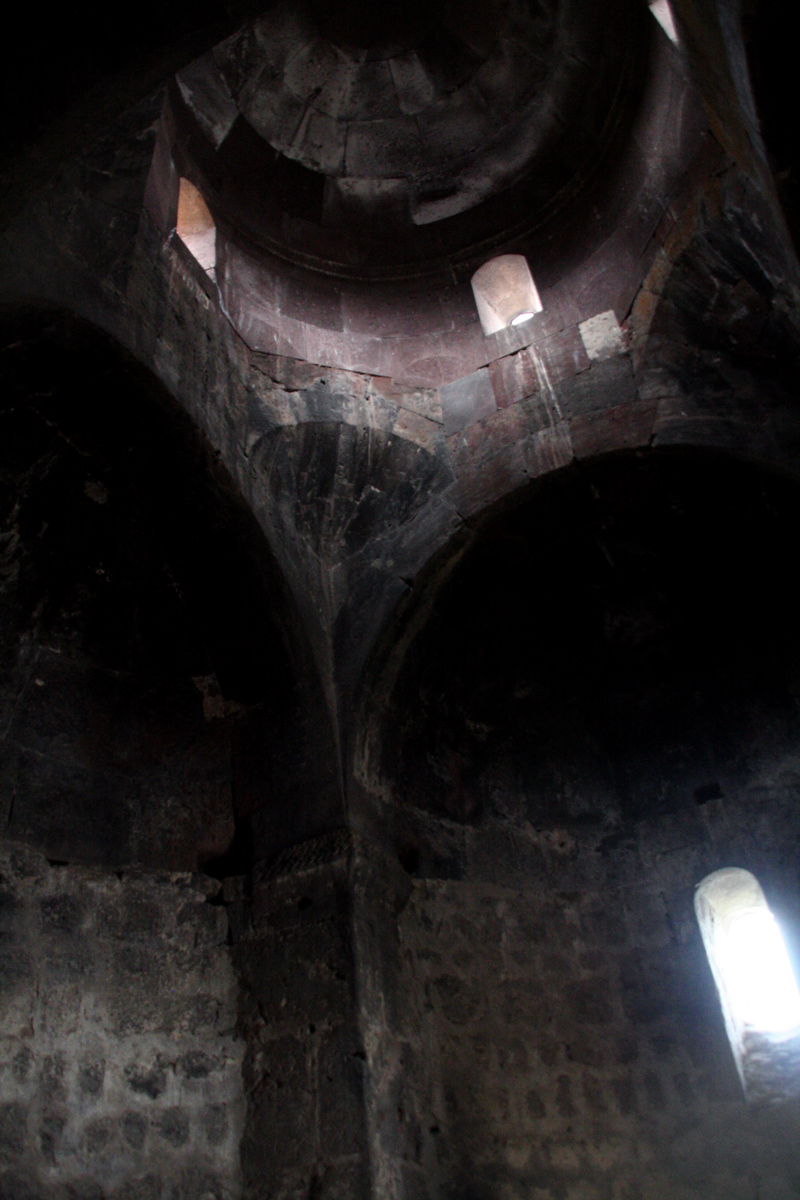
Church interior.

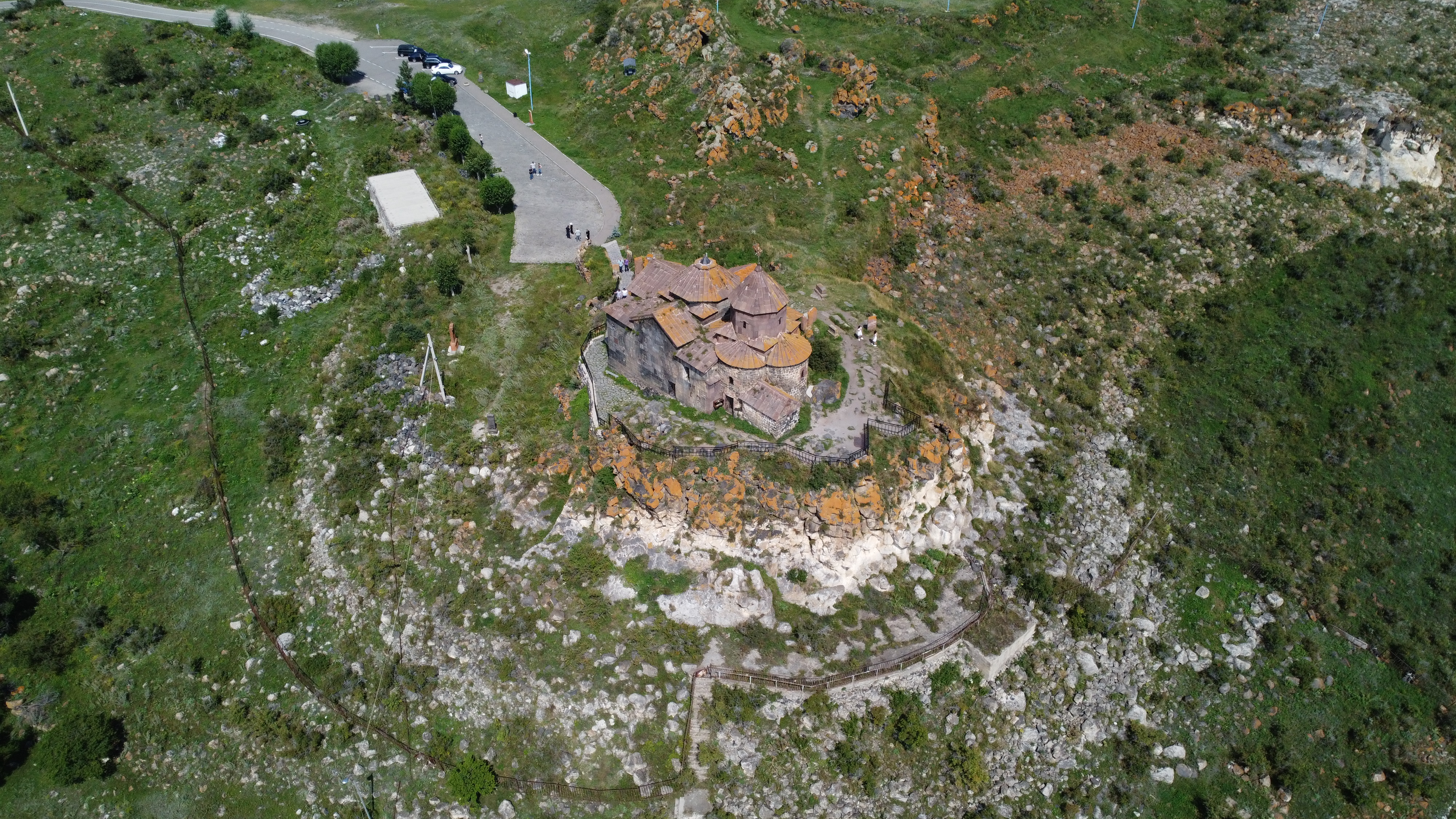
aerial view

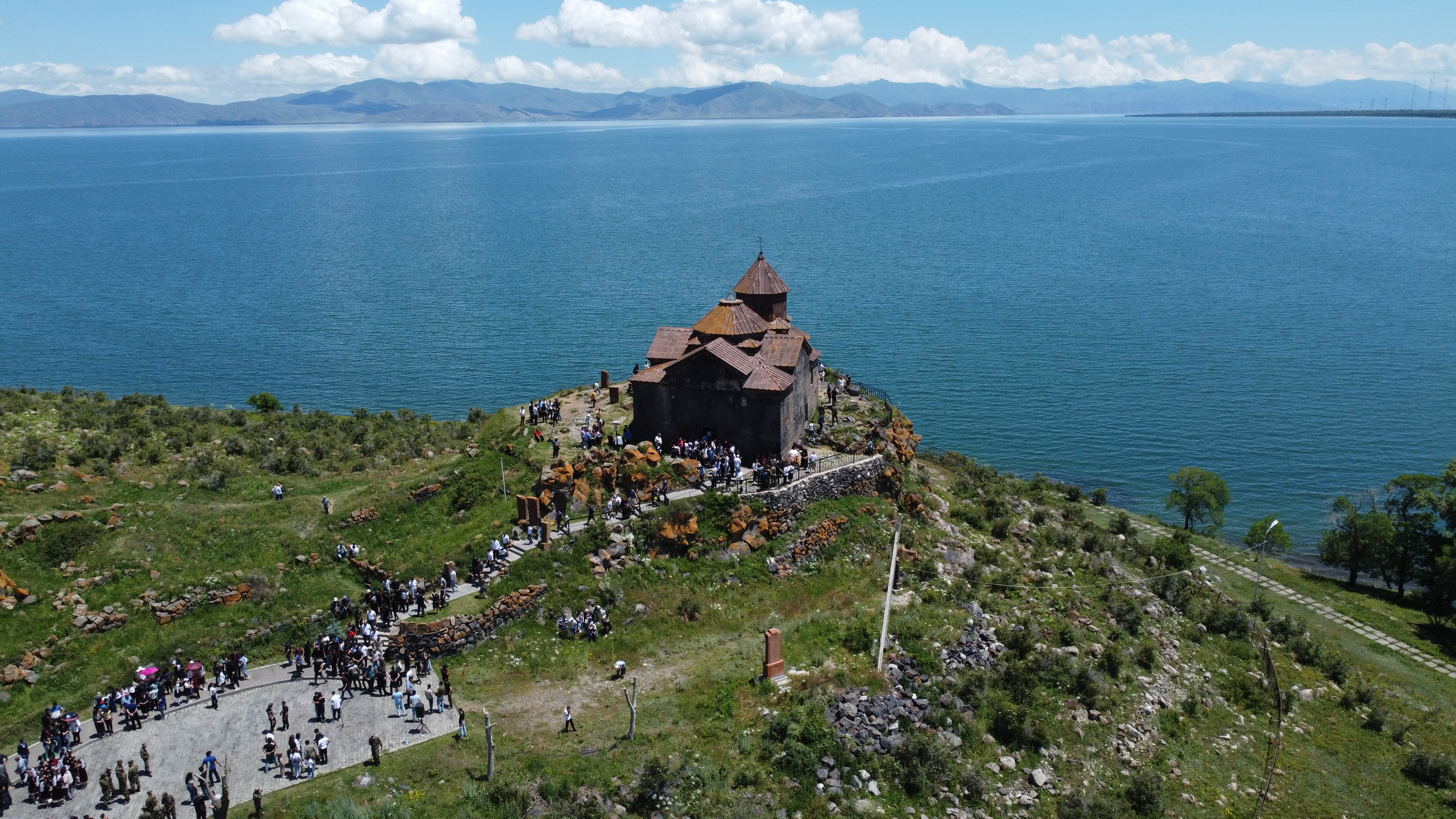
Lake Sevan in the background
