= Hayravank =

Hayravank Հայրավանք
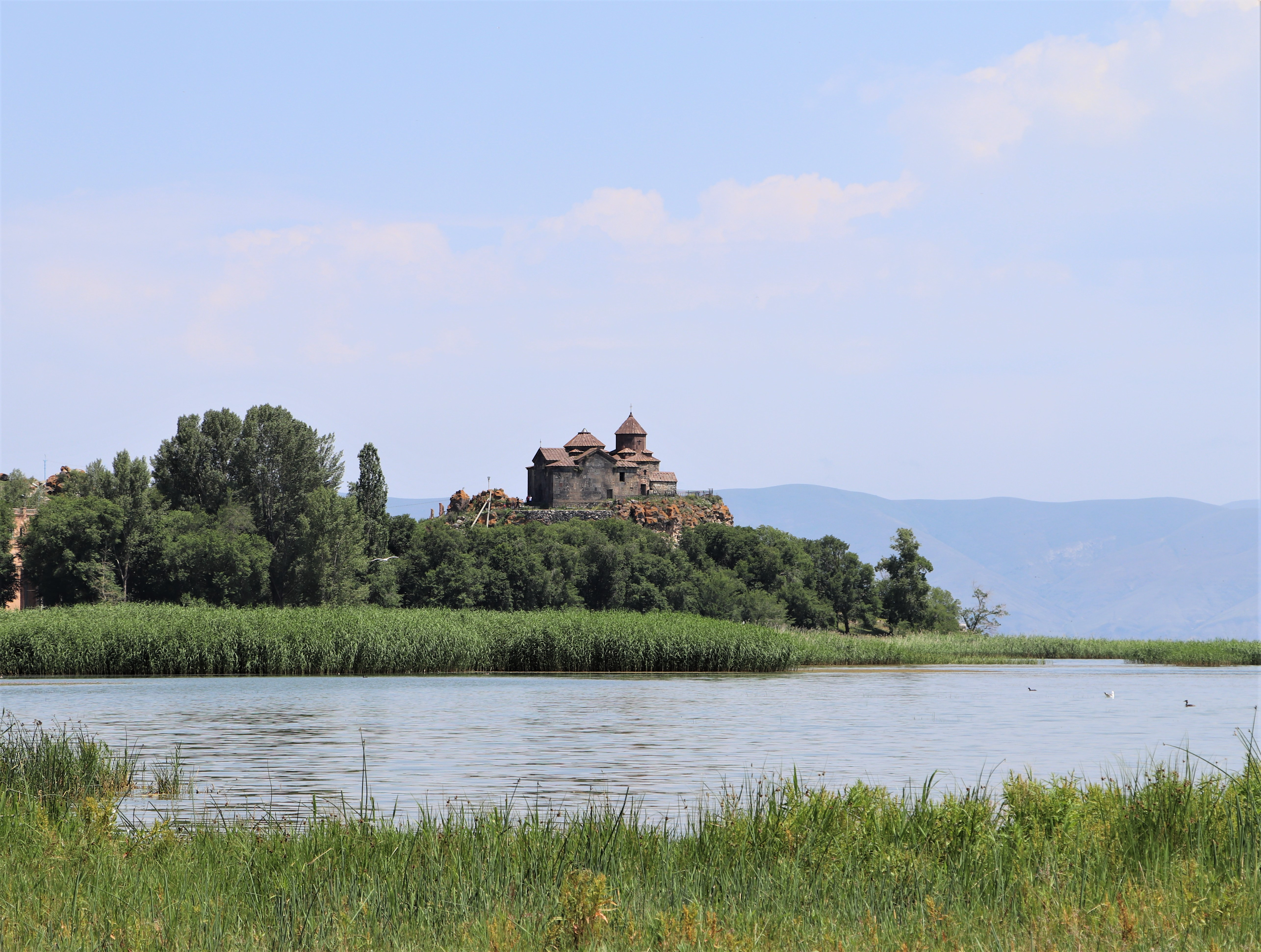
- Scenery around Hayravank Monastery

- Location within Armenia Location within Gegharkunik
- Coordinates: 40°26′04″N 45°05′49″E
- Country: Armenia
- Province: Gegharkunik
- Municipality: Gavar

Population (2011)
  - Total: 680
- Time zone: UTC+4 (AMT)

Hayravank (Armenian: Հայրավանք) is a village in the Gavar Municipality of the Gegharkunik Province of Armenia. The village is the site of the 9th-century Hayravank Monastery.

== Gallery ==
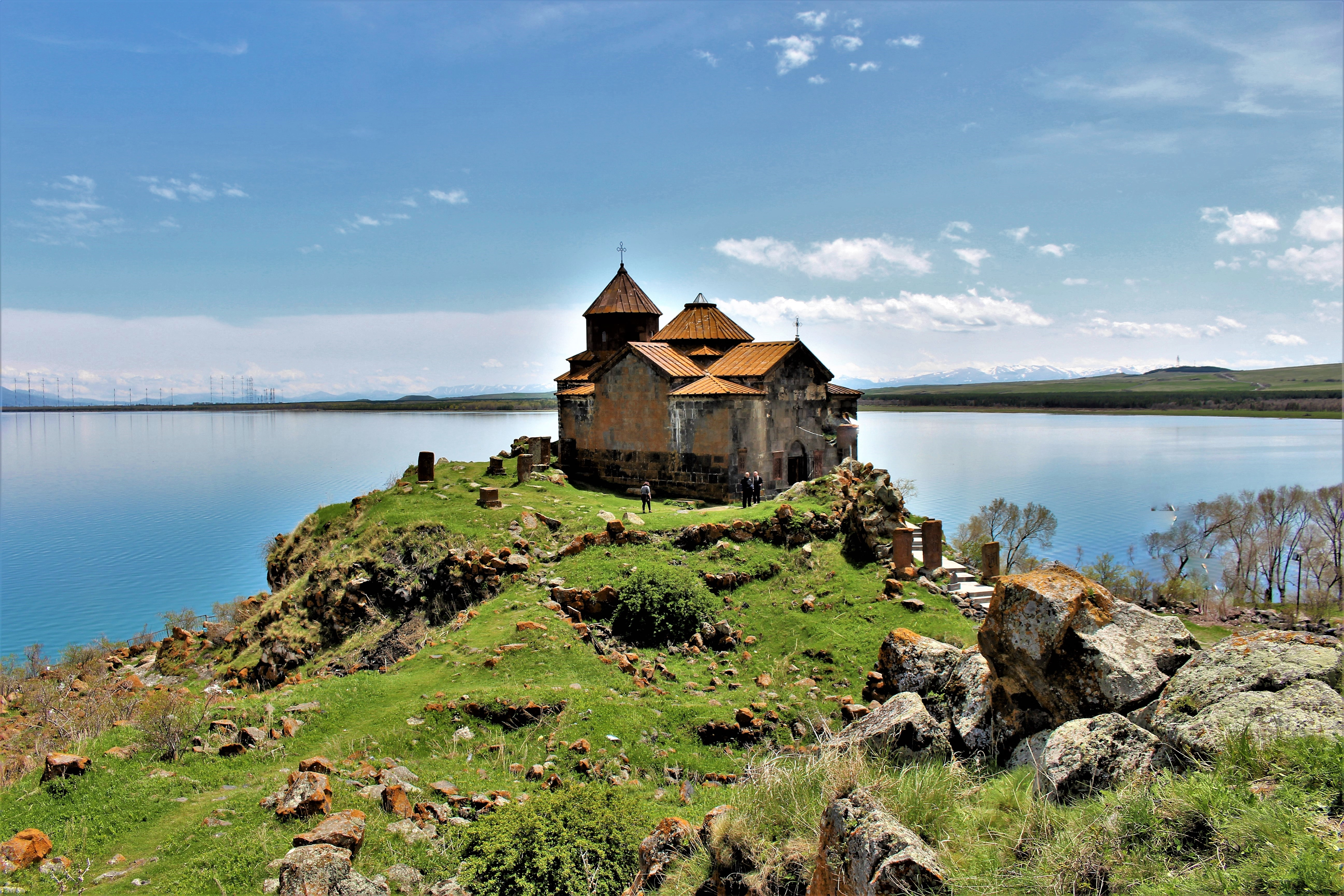
The 9th-century Hayravank Monastery

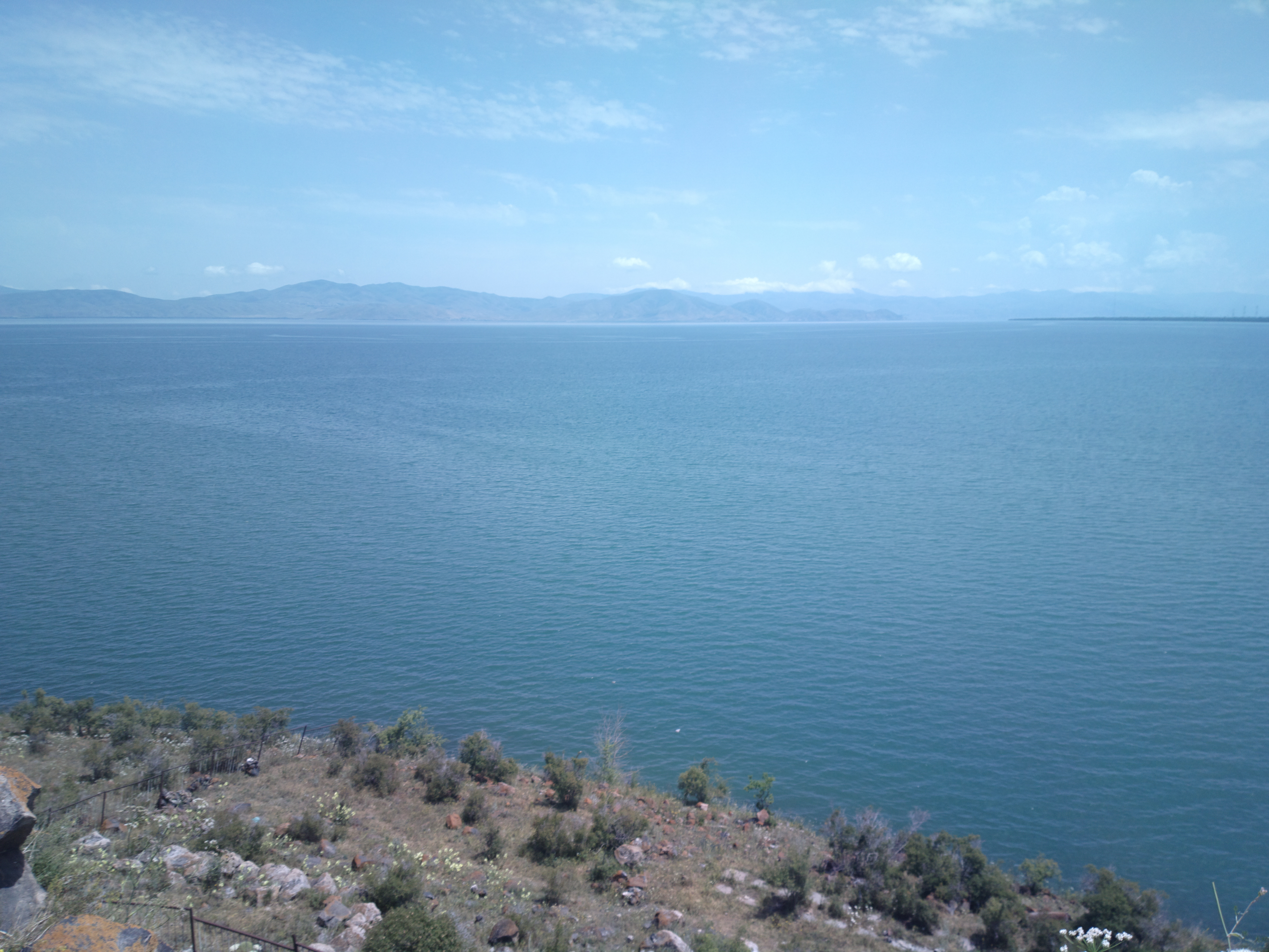
Lake Sevan near Hayravank Monastery

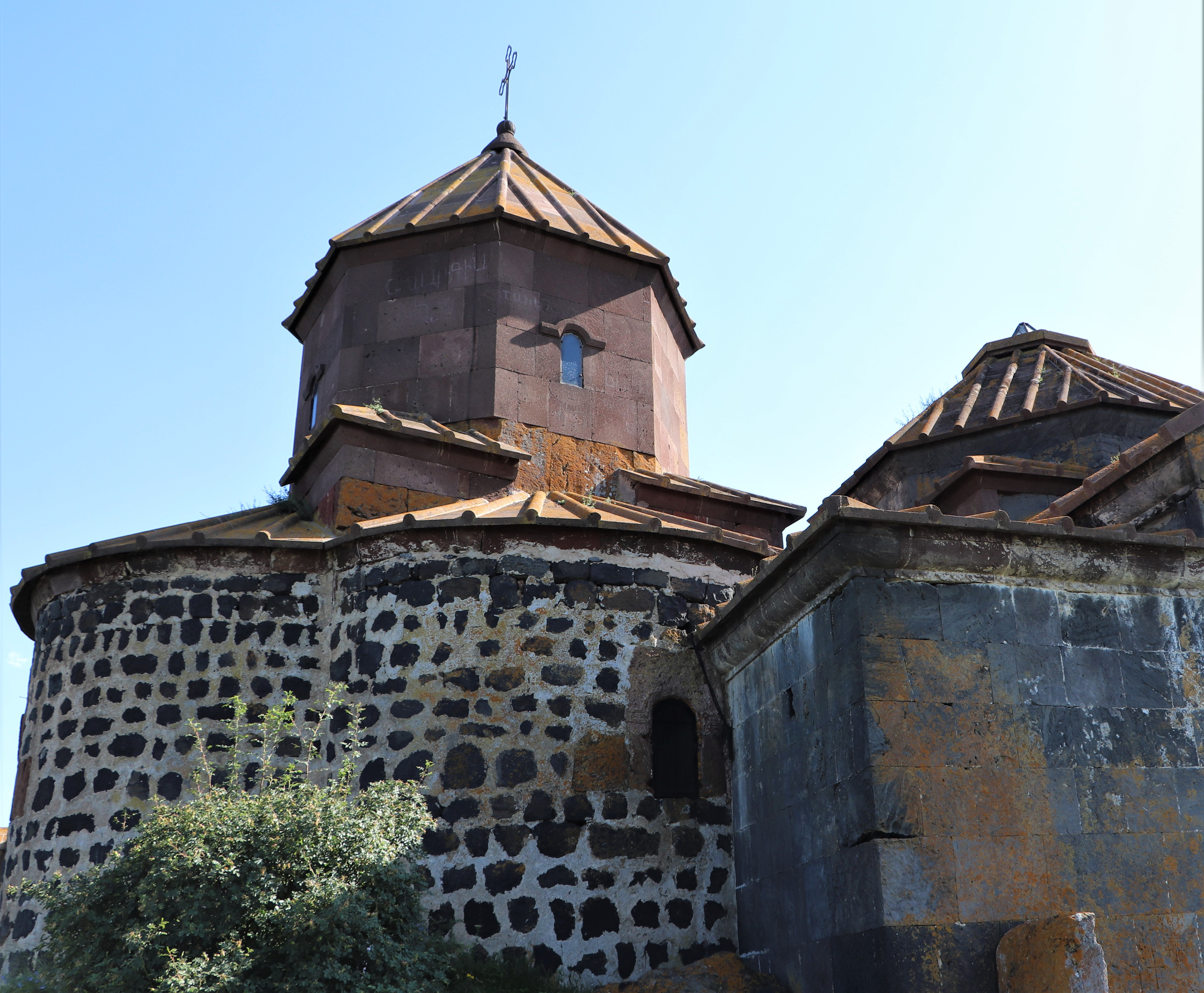
Hayravank Monastery

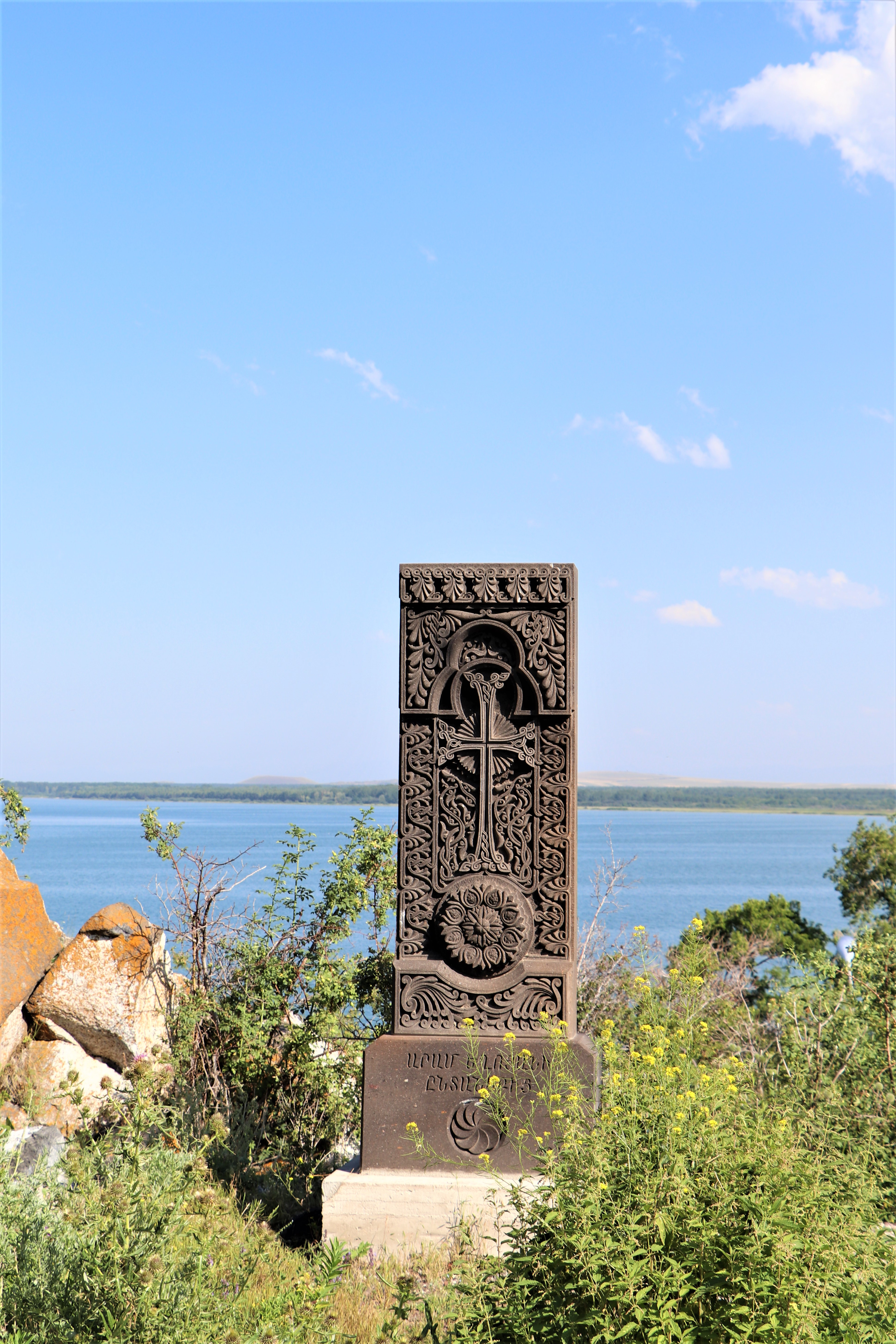
Khachkar and Lake Sevan

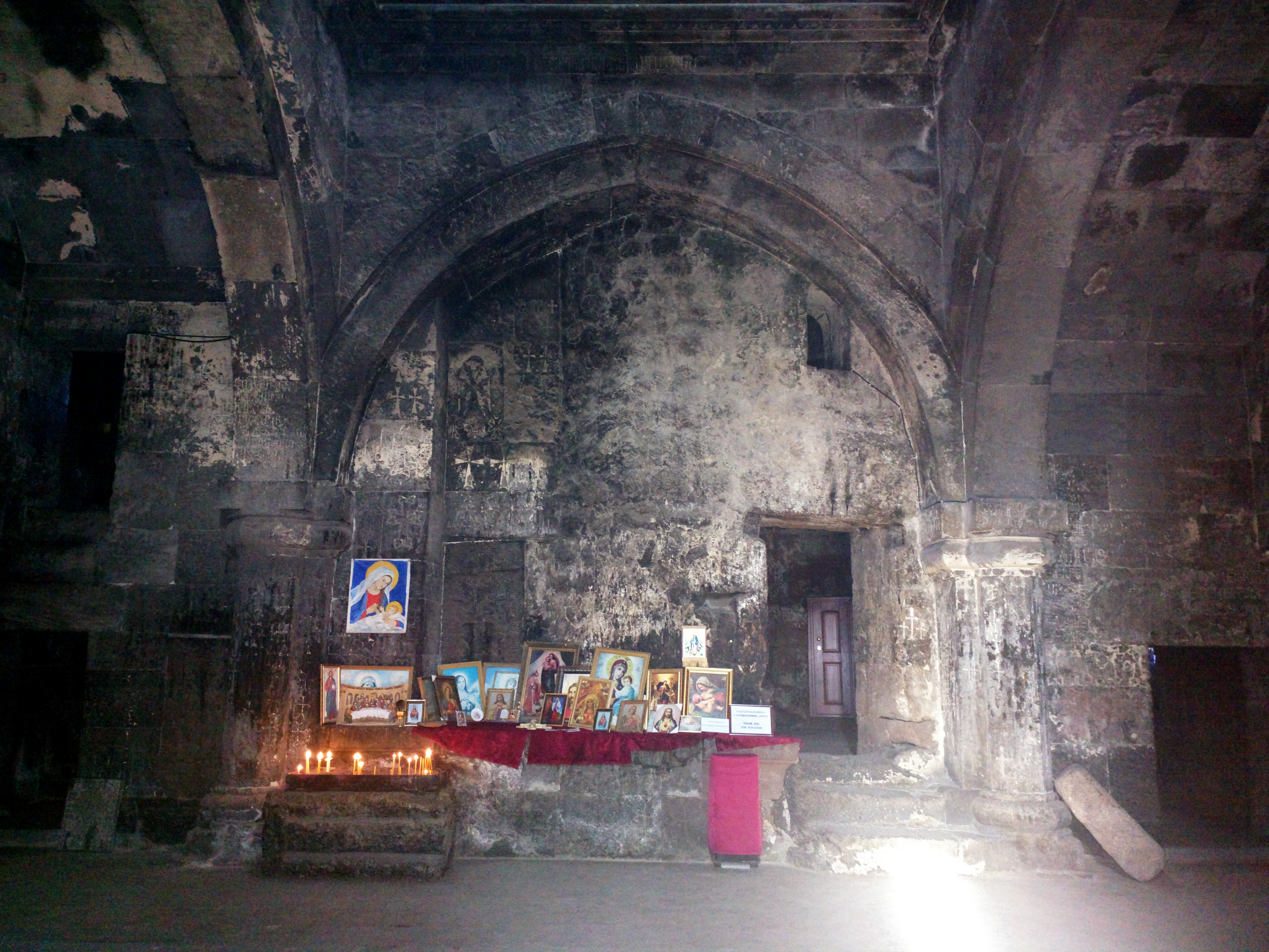
Interior of Hayravank Monastery

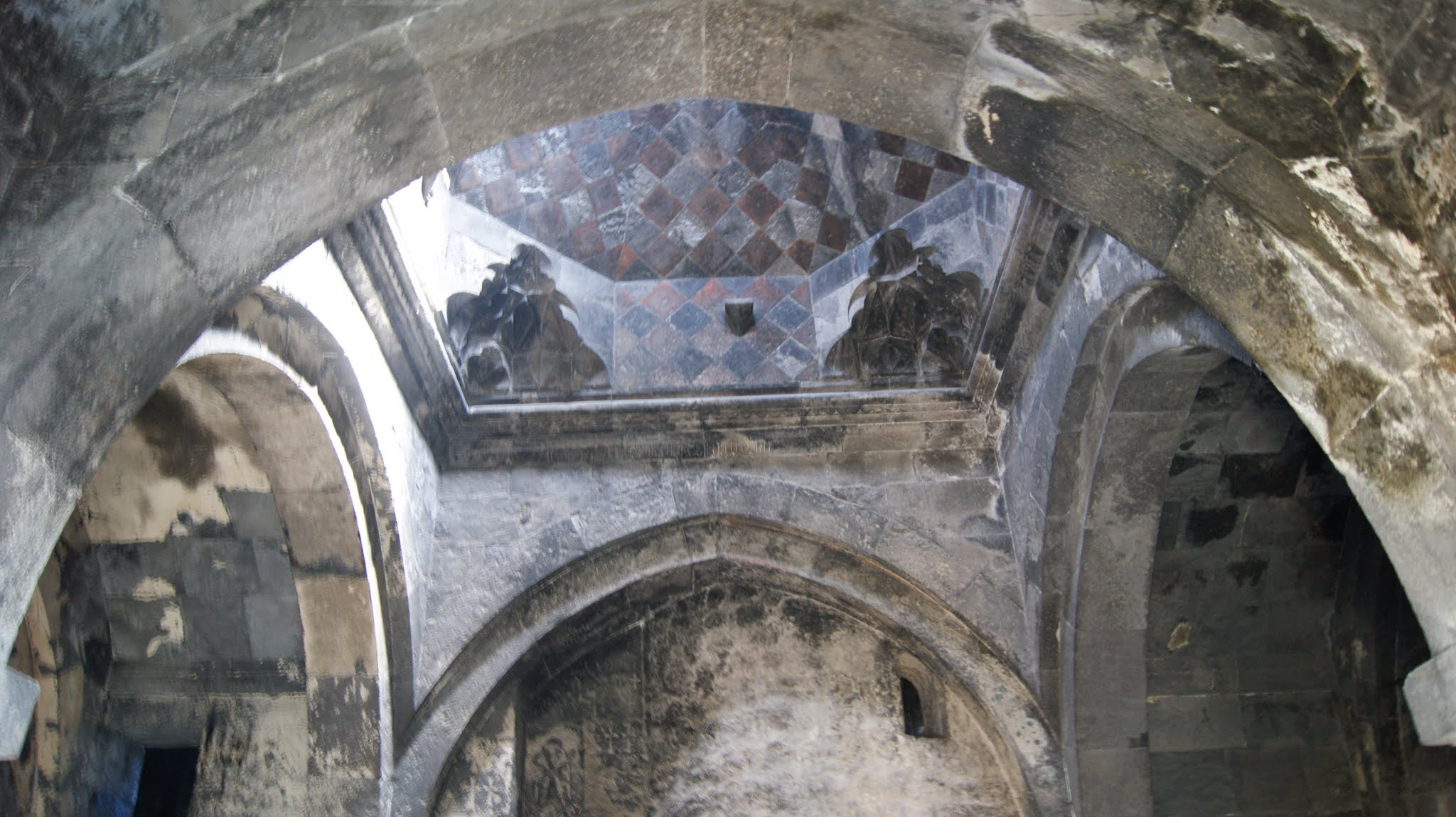
Interior of Hayravank Monastery

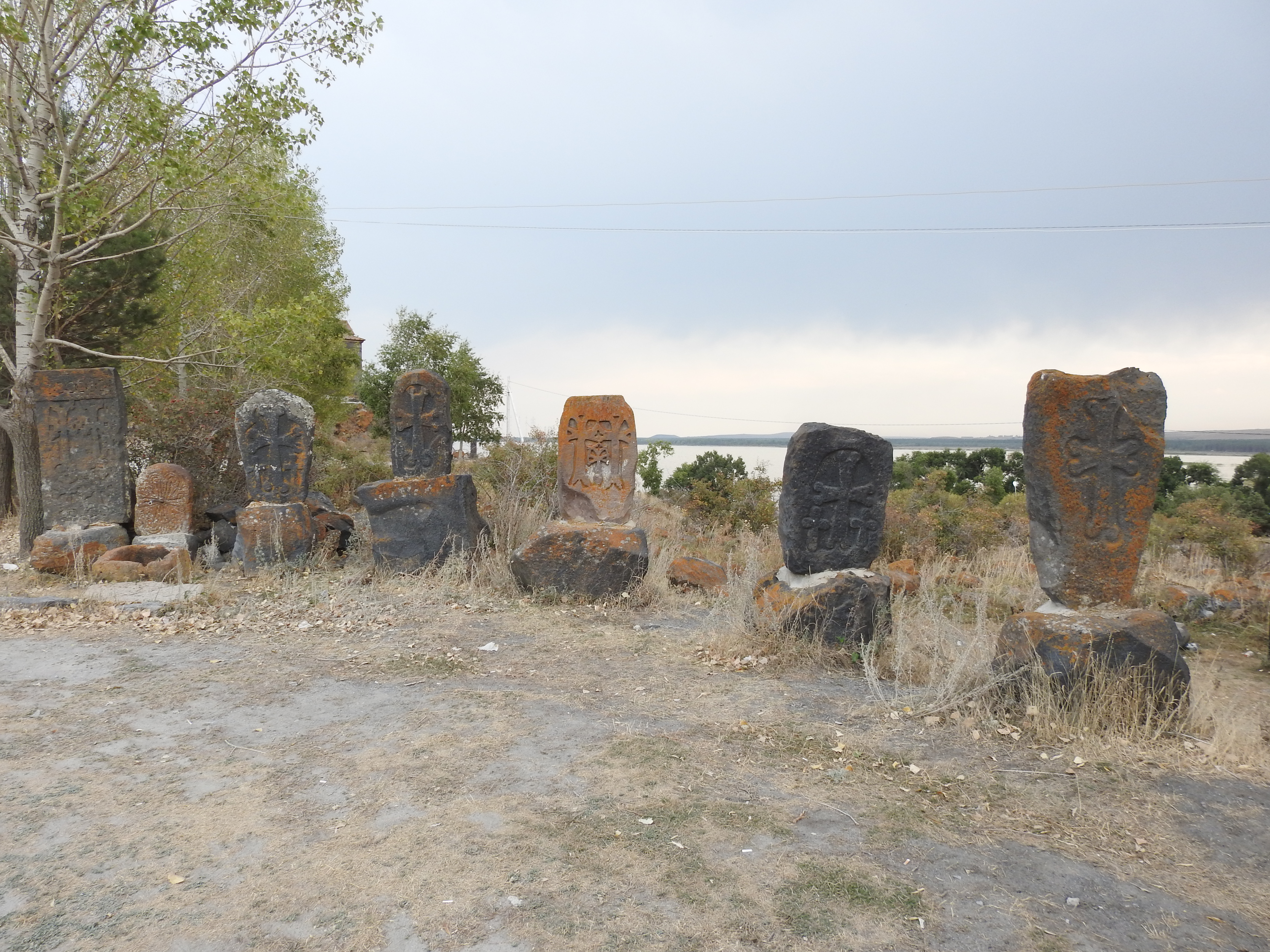
Khachkars near Hayravank Monastery

== Notable people ==
- PARG, singer-songwriter
