= Makenis =

Village in Gegharkunik, Armenia

Makenis Մաքենիս
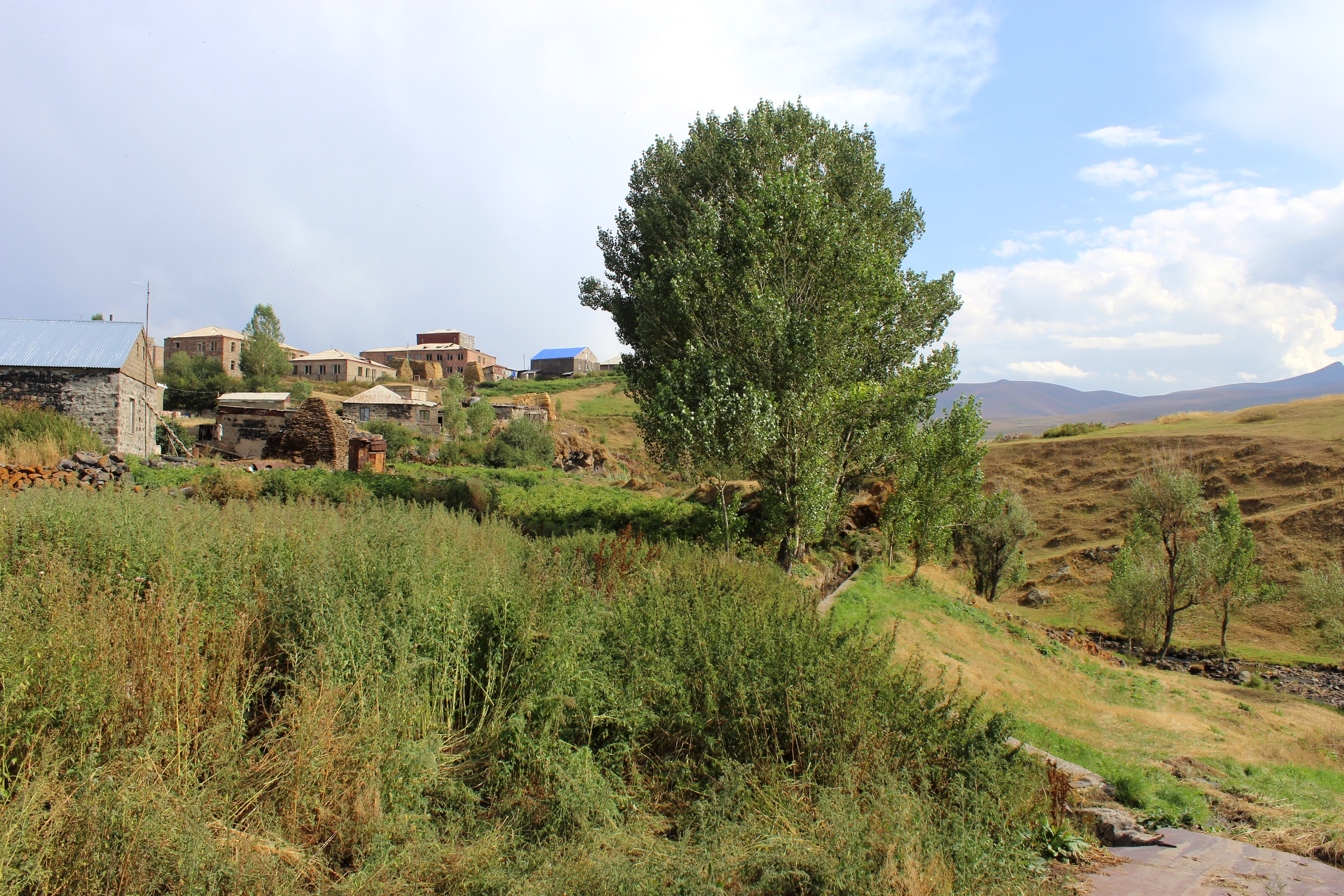
- The village of Makenis overlooking the gorge, as seen from Makenyats Vank.

- Location within Armenia Location within Gegharkunik
- Coordinates: 40°07′26″N 45°36′39″E
- Country: Armenia
- Province: Gegharkunik
- Municipality: Vardenis

Population (2011)
  - Total: 405
- Time zone: UTC+4 (AMT)

Makenis (Armenian: Մաքենիս) is a village in the Vardenis Municipality of the Gegharkunik Province of Armenia.

== History ==
The Makenyats Vank monastery in the village was a major cultural and educational center of medieval Gegharkunik, with structures dating from the 9th to 13th centuries.

== Gallery ==
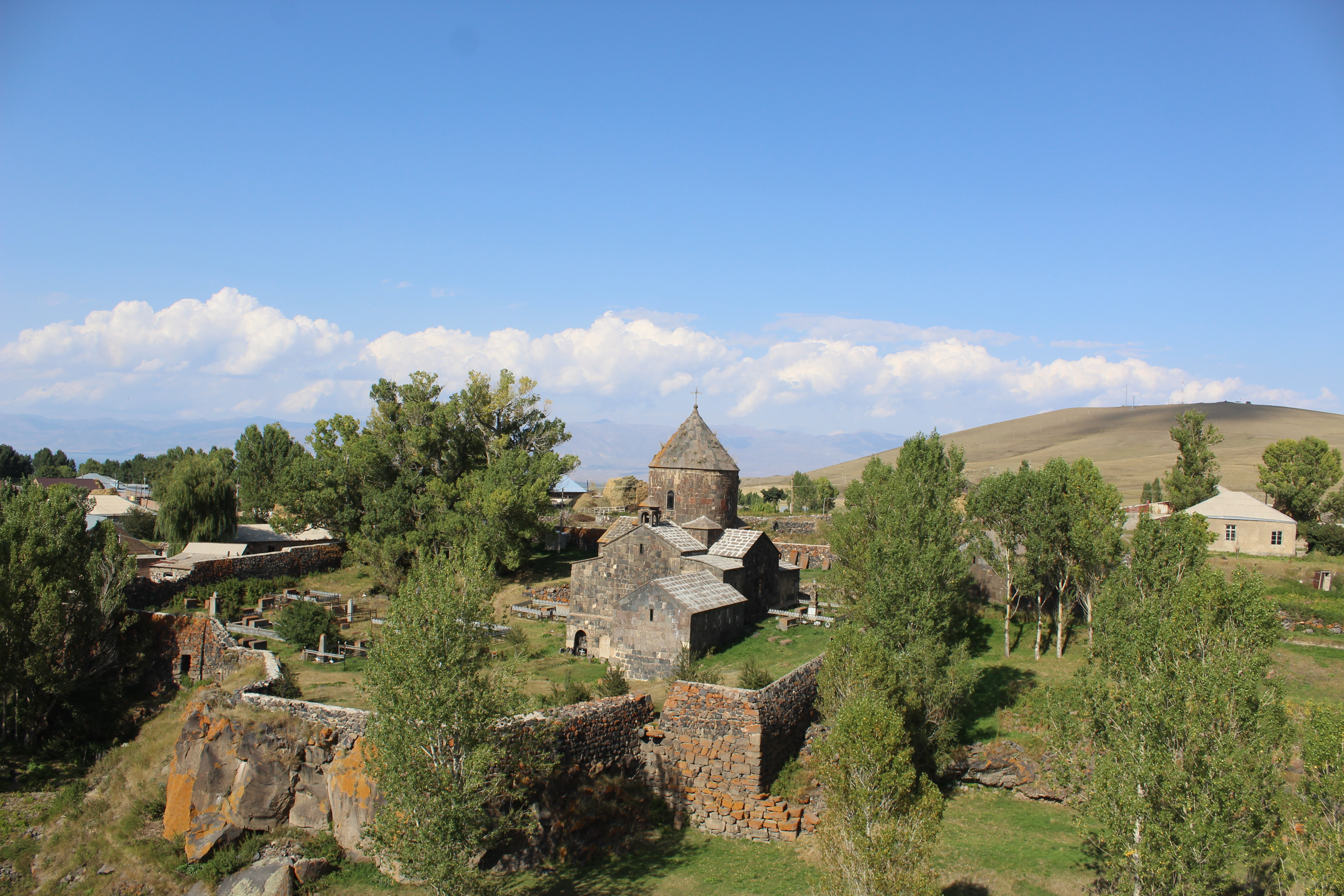
Makenyats Vank

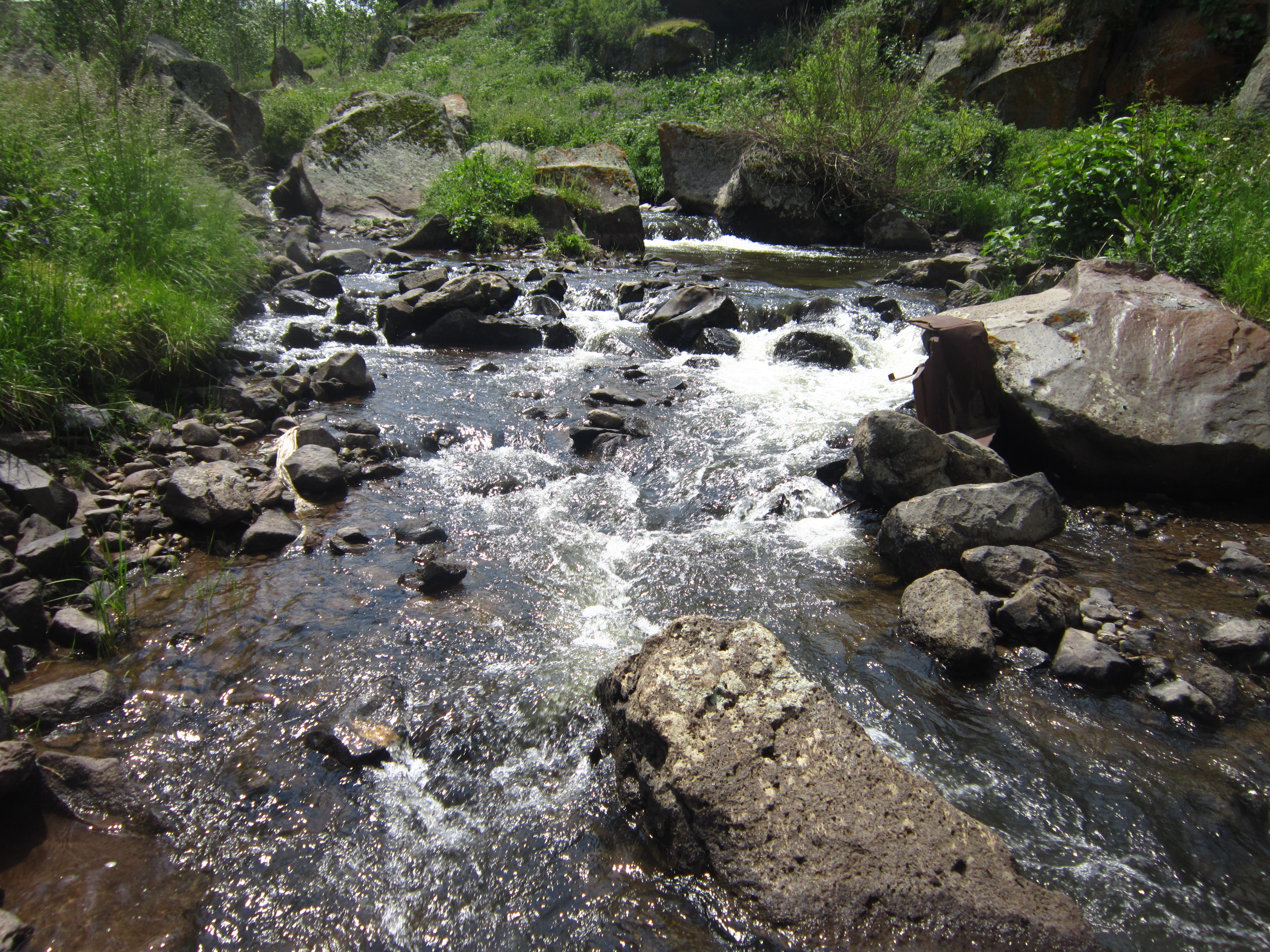
River near Makenyats Vank

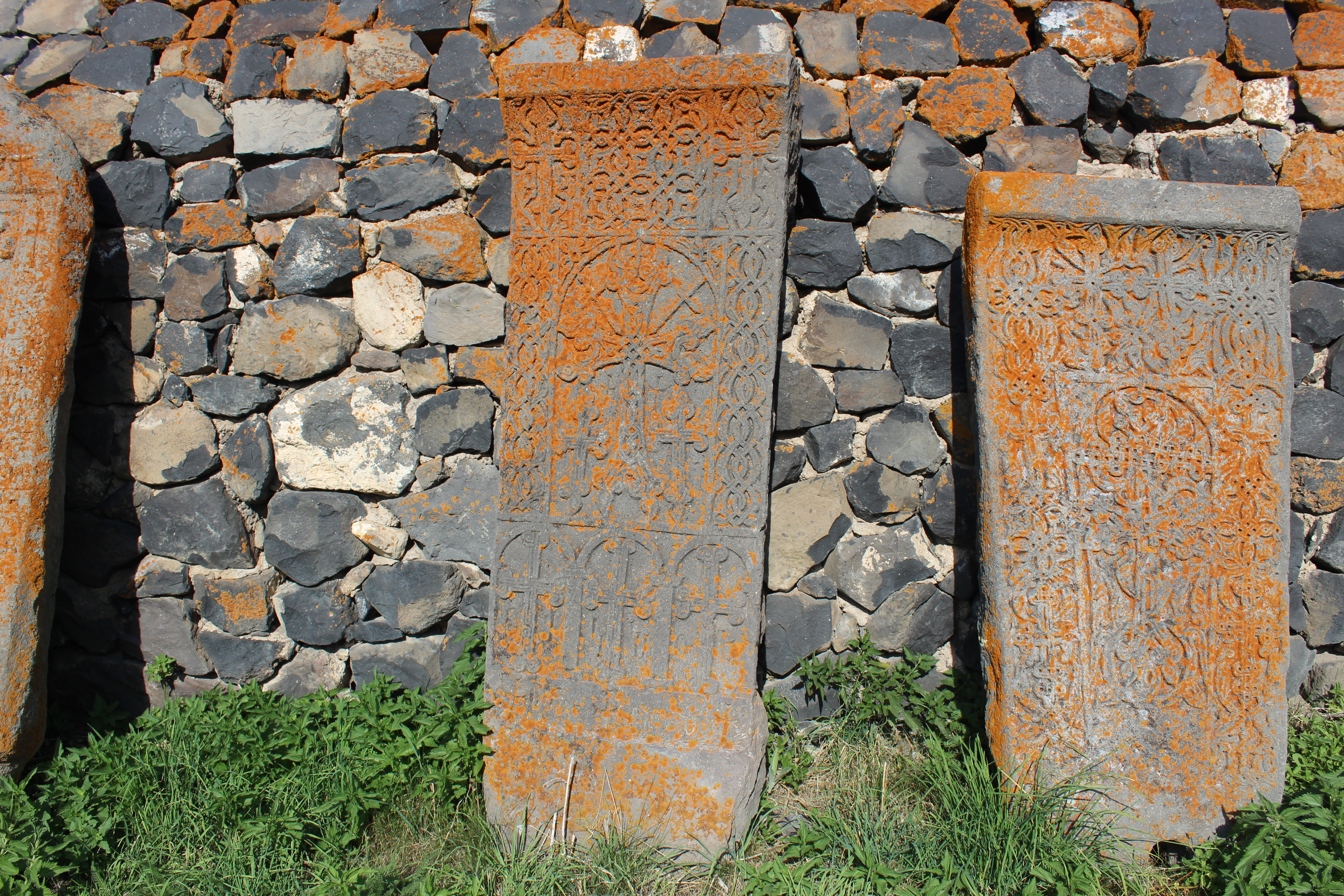
Khachkars around Makenyats Vank

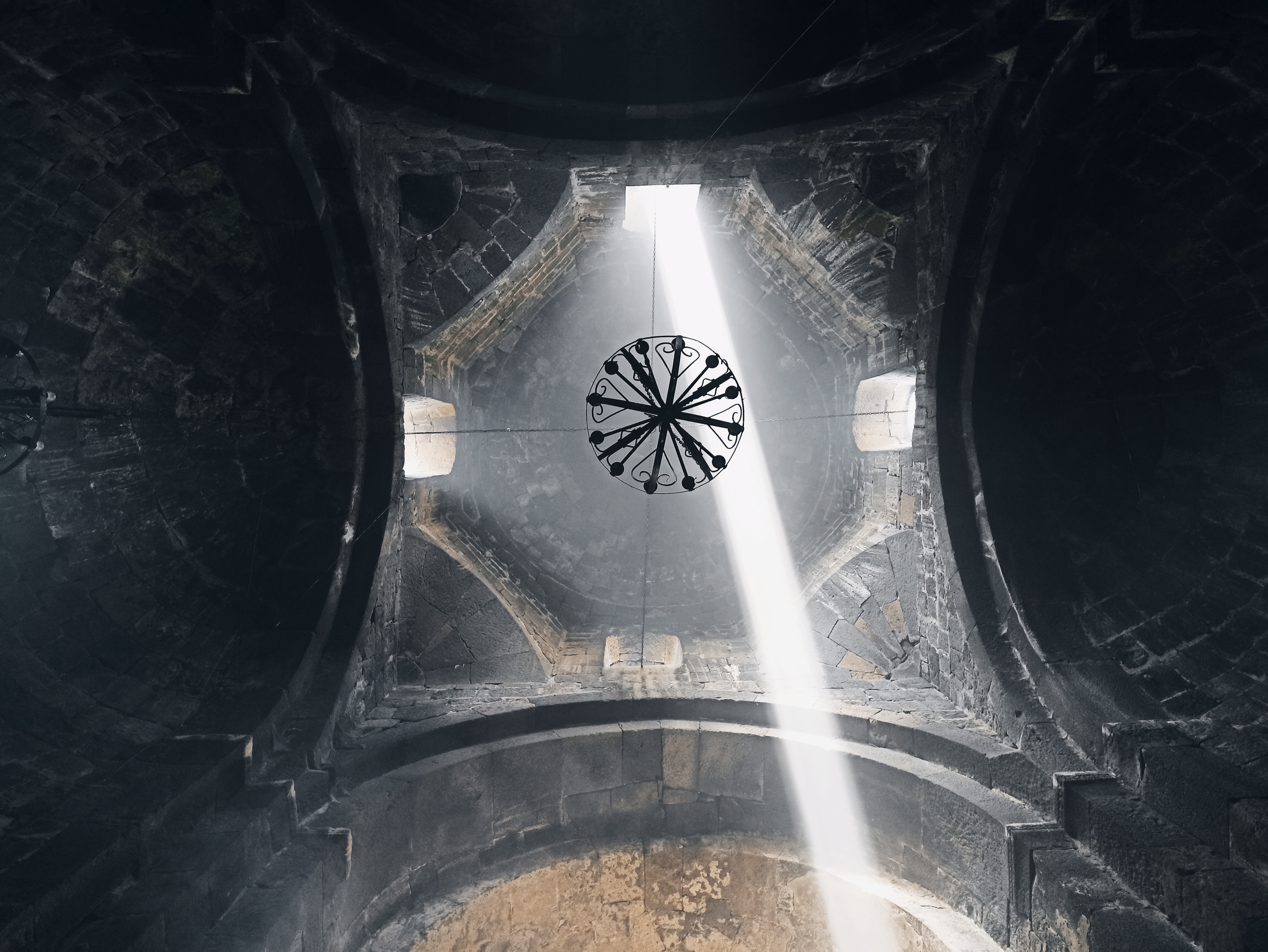
The dome of Makenyats Vank
