= Makenyats Vank =

Cultural heritage monument of Armenia

Makenyats Vank Մաքենյաց վանք
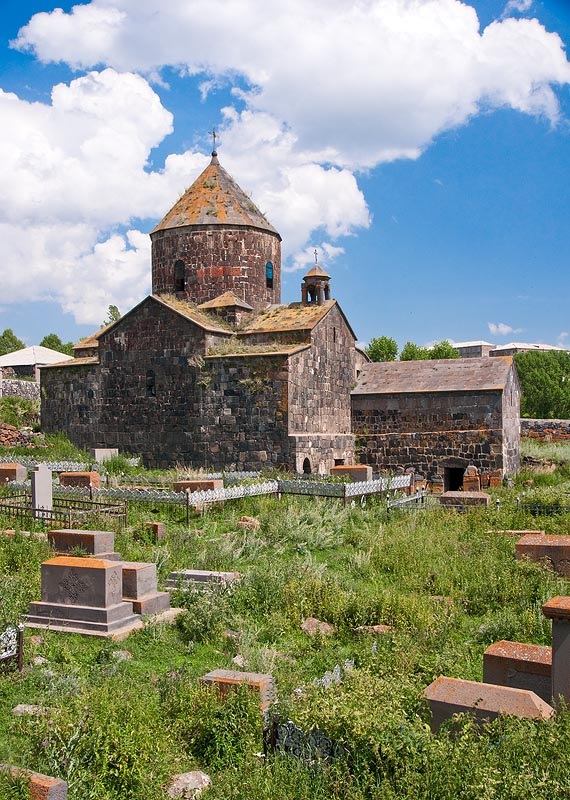

- Location within Armenia Location within Gegharkunik

Religion
- Affiliation: Armenian Apostolic Church

Location
- Location: Makenis, Gegharkunik Province, Armenia
- Coordinates: 40.125060°N 45.613259°E

Architecture
- Style: Armenian
- Completed: 9th–13th centuries
- Dome: 1

Makenyats Vank (Armenian: Մաքենյաց վանք) is a 9th–13th century Armenian monastery located 5 kilometres (3.1 mi) south of Lake Sevan in the village of Makenis in the Gegharkunik Province of Armenia. The monastery was founded in 851 with the construction of the central S. Astvatsatsin Church by Prince Grigor Supan II, the son of Princess Mariam, who was also the founder of Kotavank in Nerkin Getashen, Armenia. Makenyats Vank served as a major cultural and educational center for the medieval province of Gegharkunik.

== Architecture ==
The main church of S. Astvatsatsin is cruciform in plan, with a conical dome supported by a circular tholobate below. Four windows pierce the walls of the tholobate, letting some light into the church interior. A large horse carved in bas-relief adorns the interior basalt lintel of the main portal to the church.

A single cupola rests over the southwest entry. Numerous khachkars have been placed along the walls of the Church as well as the outer walls enclosing the monastery. A cemetery encompasses the church, especially around the western end, with both medieval and contemporary graves. Along the outer wall, along the gorge to the southwest corner, there is a medieval sanitary facility.

== Gallery ==
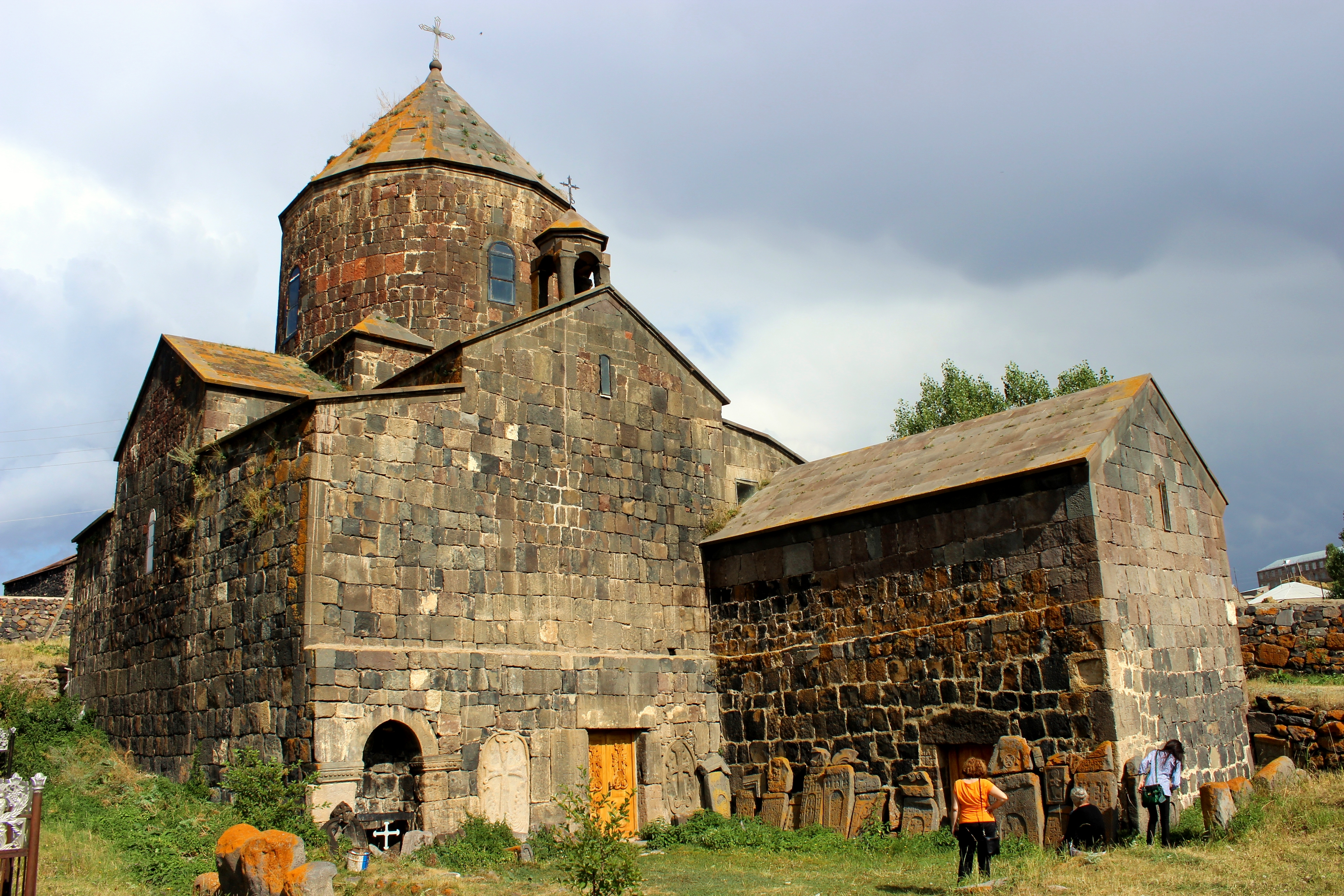
Makenyats Vank

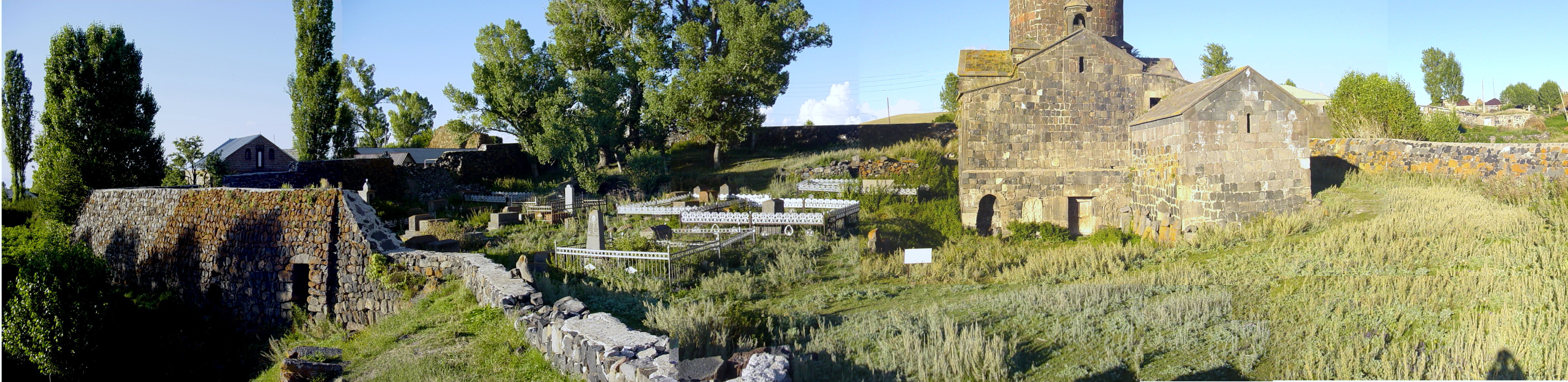
Panoramic view of Makenyats Vank

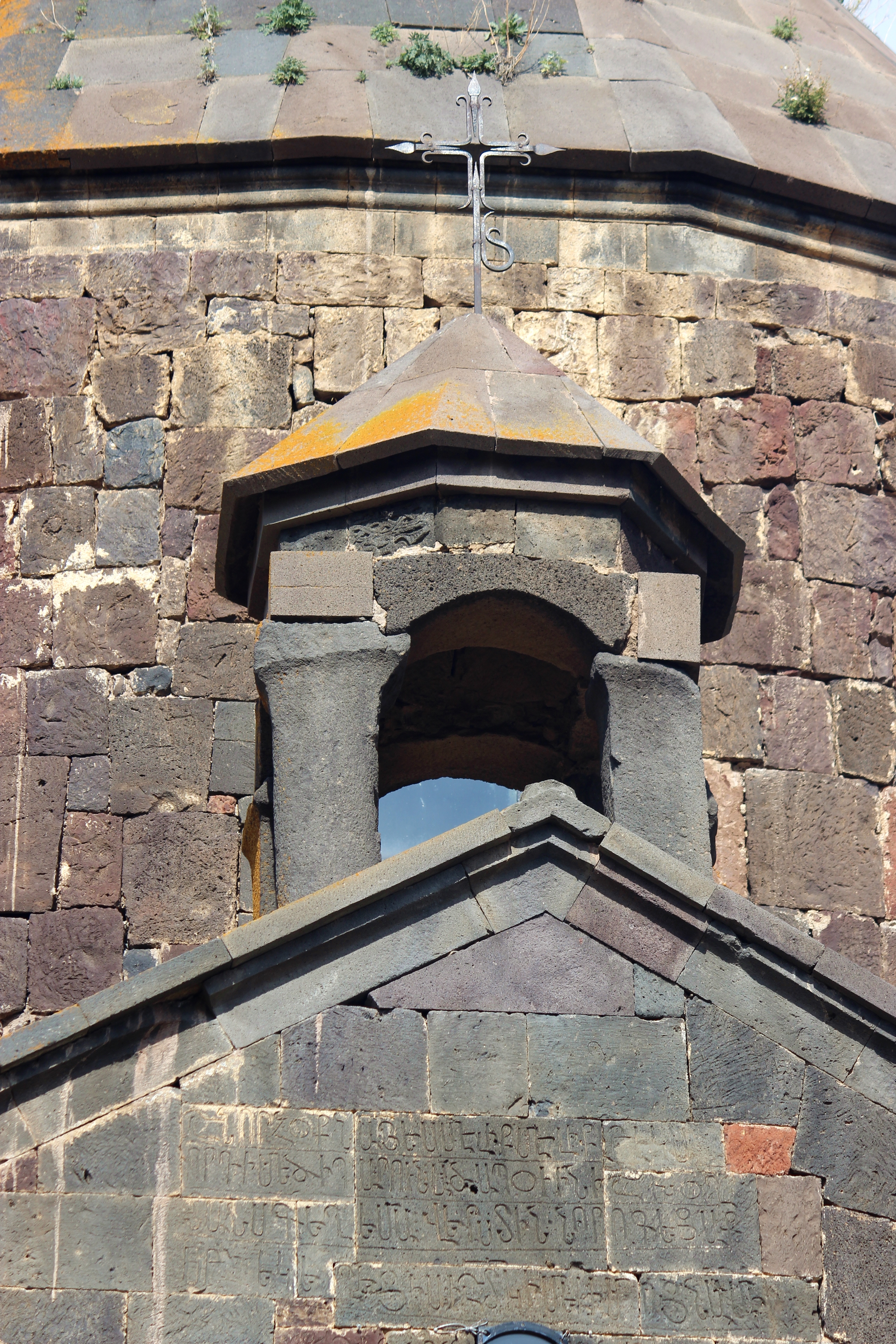
Cupola

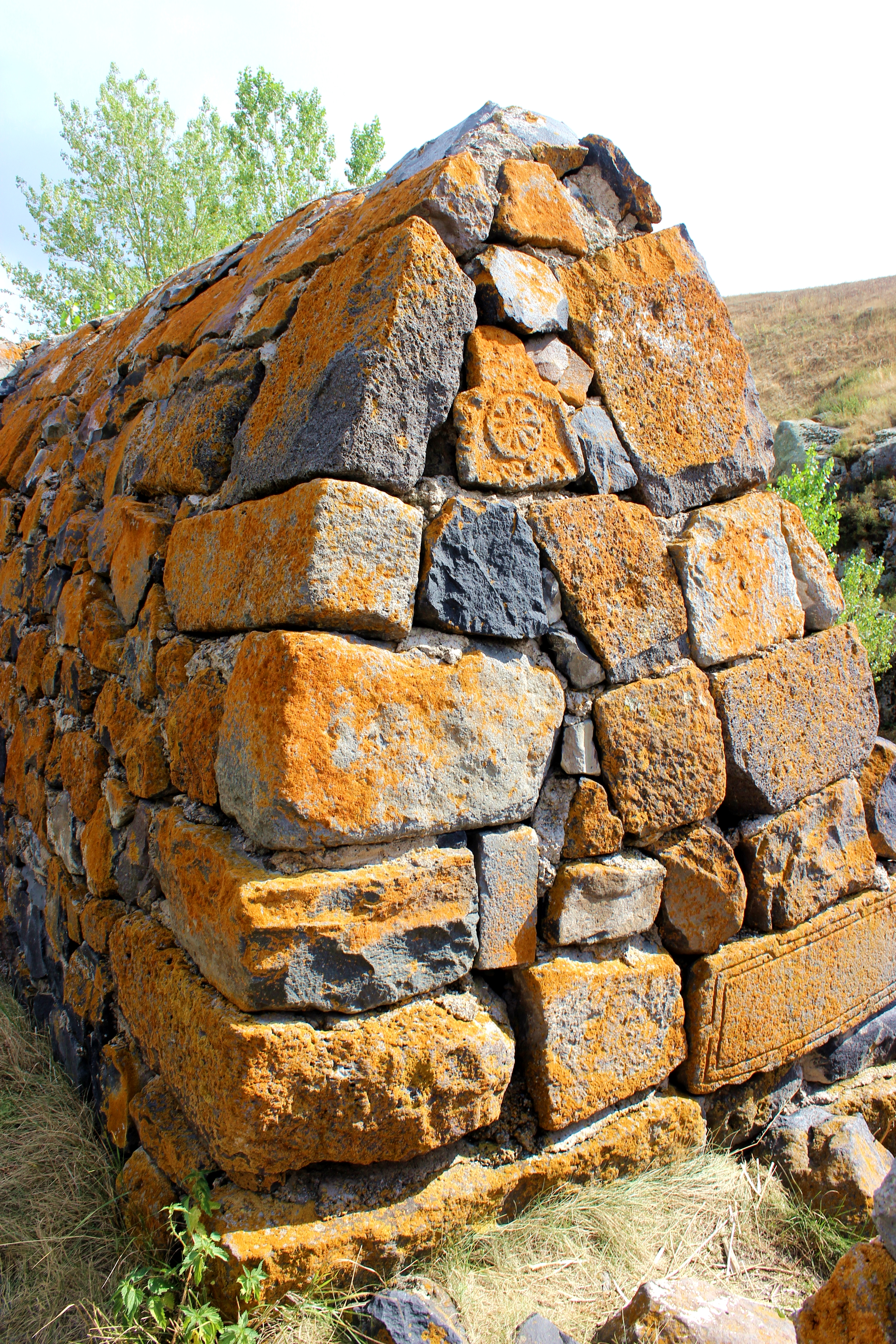
Perimeter wall surrounding the monastery.

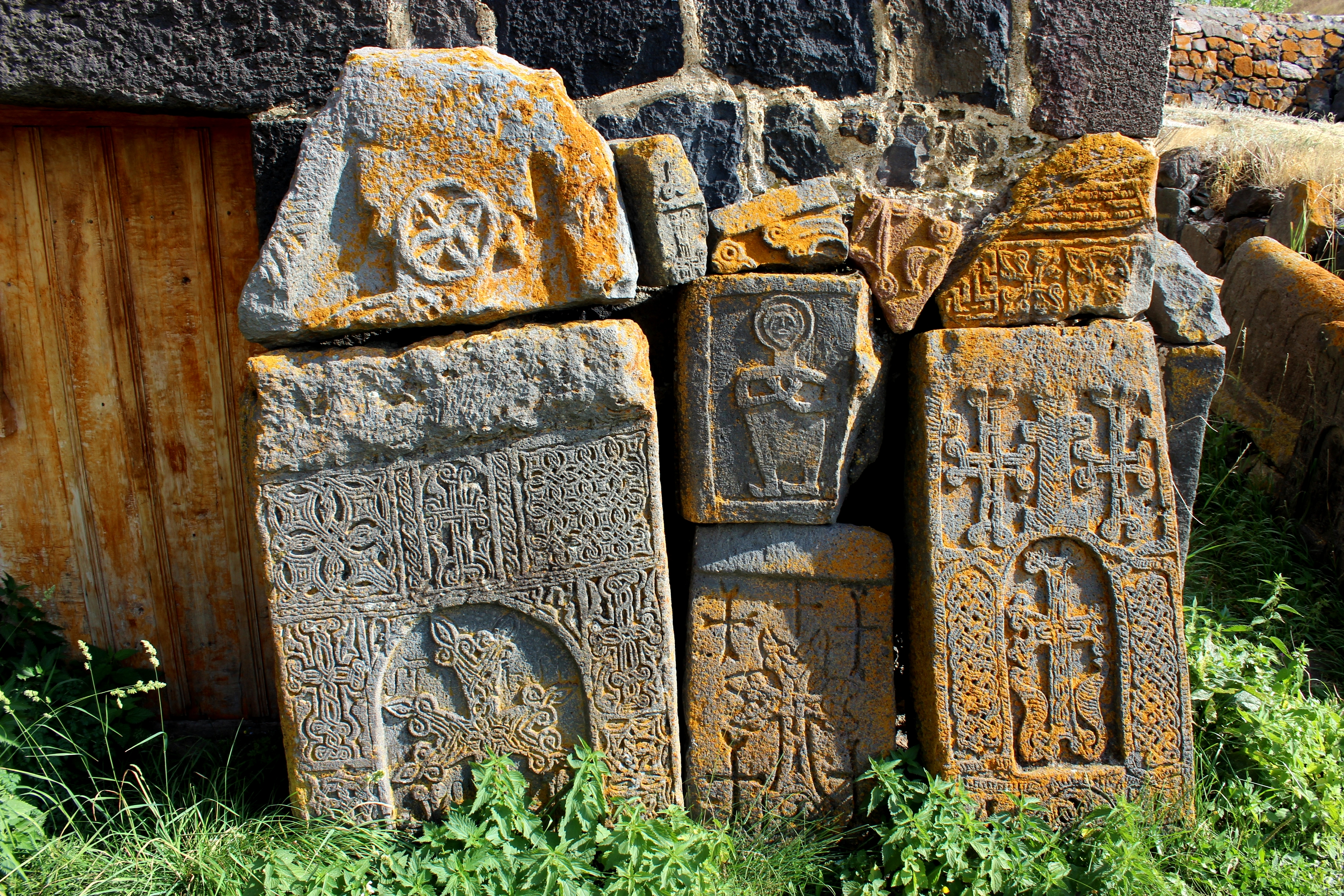
Khachkars lining the exterior wall of the church.

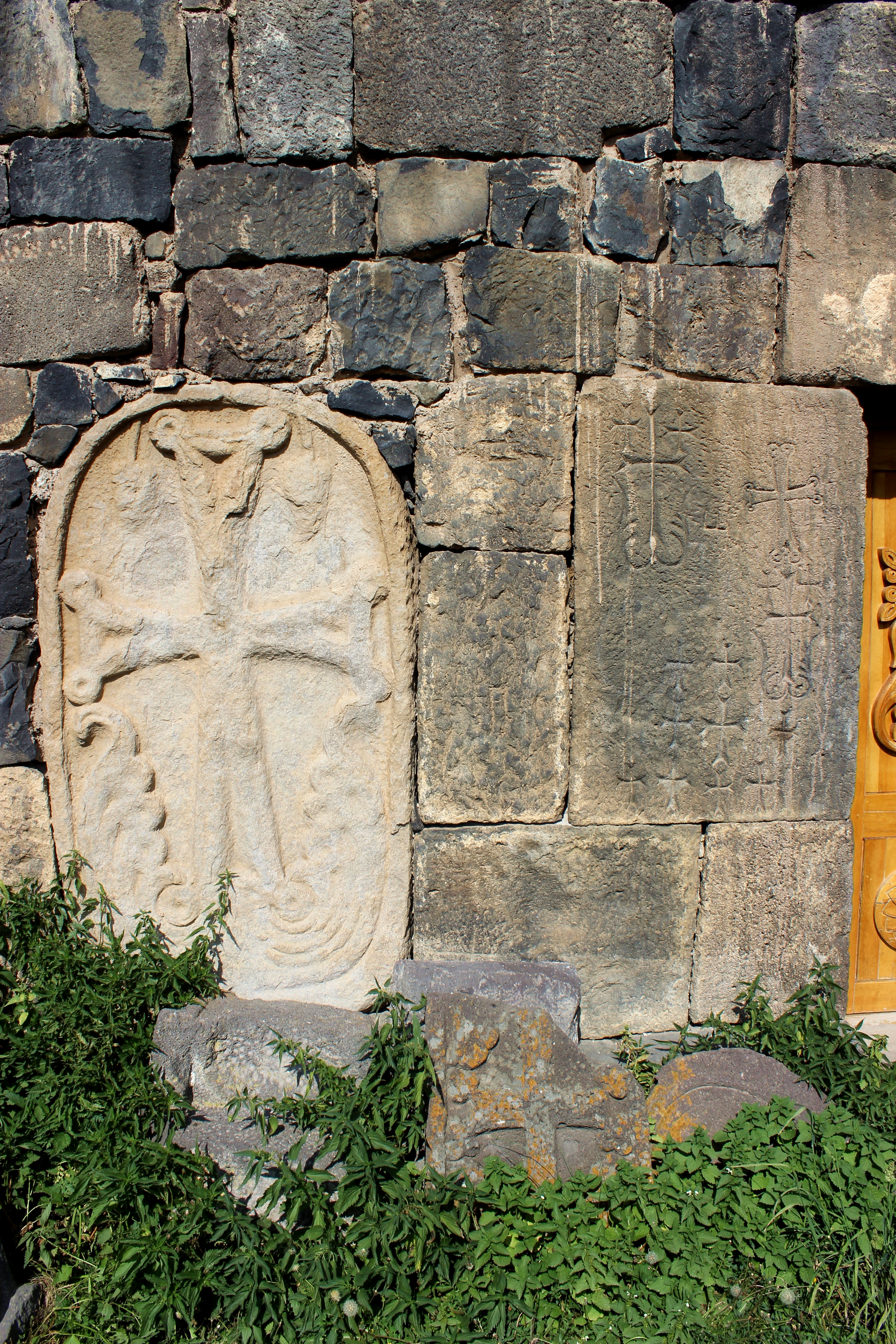
Large khachkar to the left of the main entry to the church.

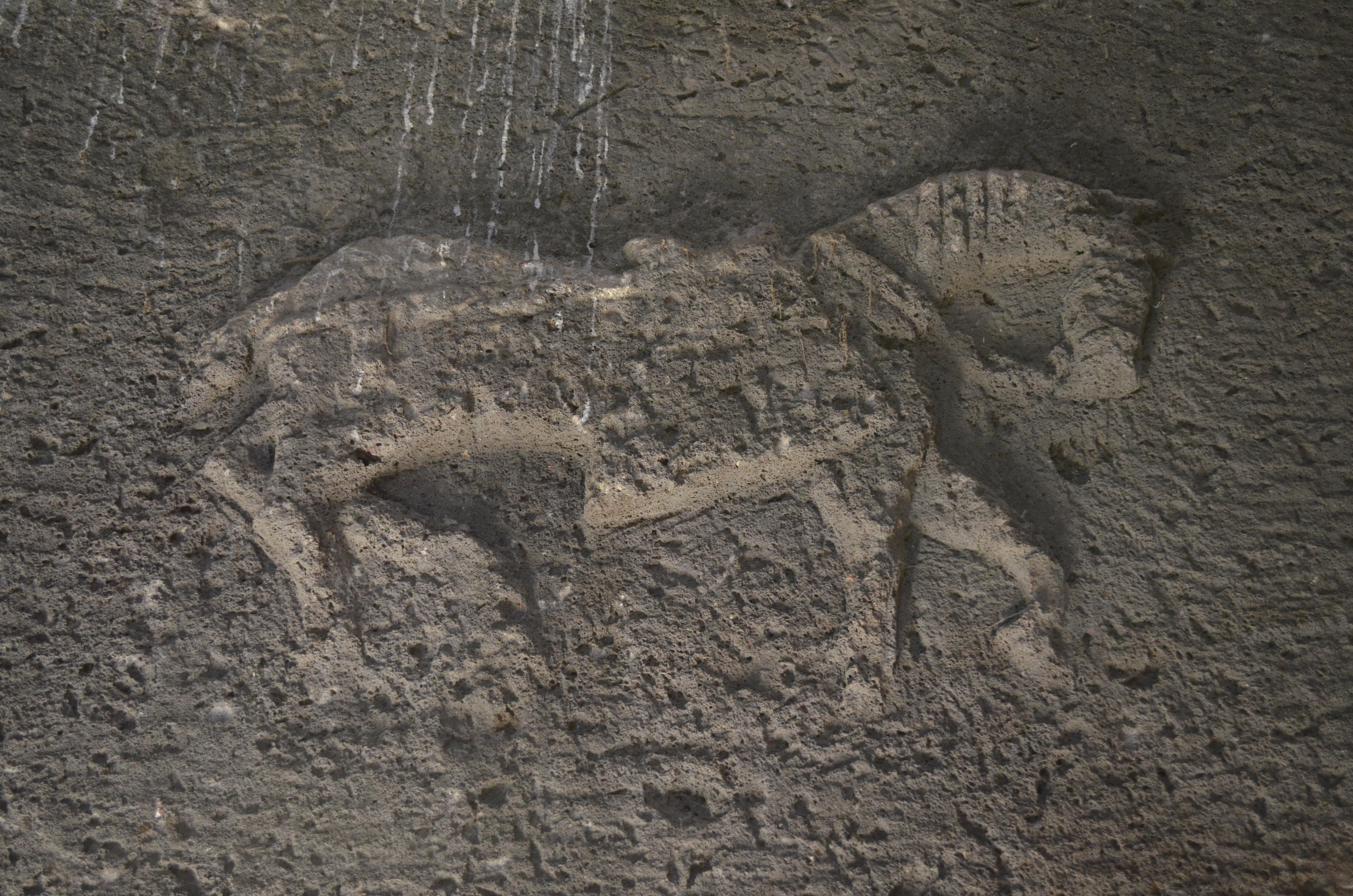
Large low-relief depiction on the interior side of the stone lintel above the entry.

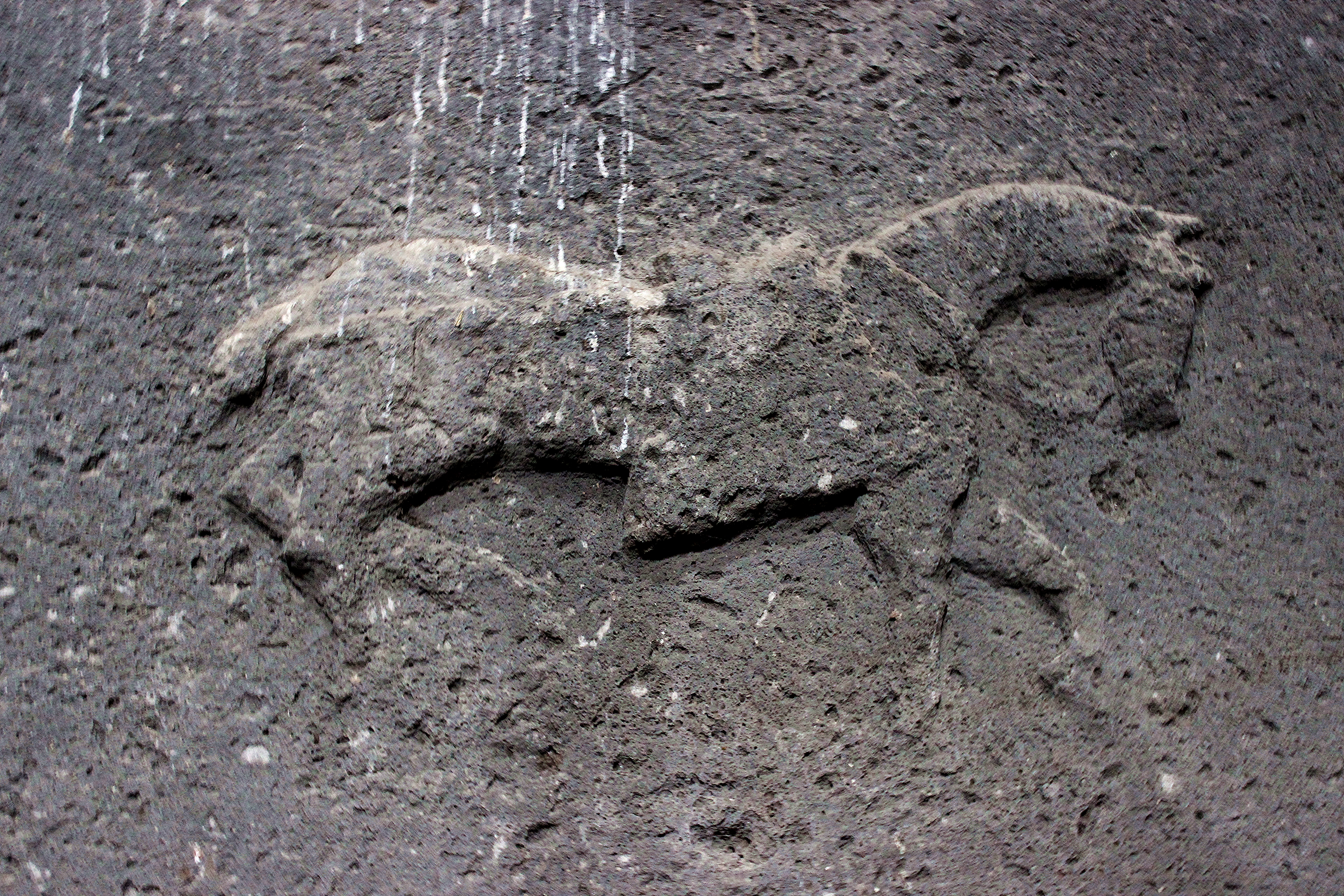
Large low-relief depiction on the interior side of the stone lintel above the entry.
