= Mount Aragats =

Mountain in the Lesser Caucasus

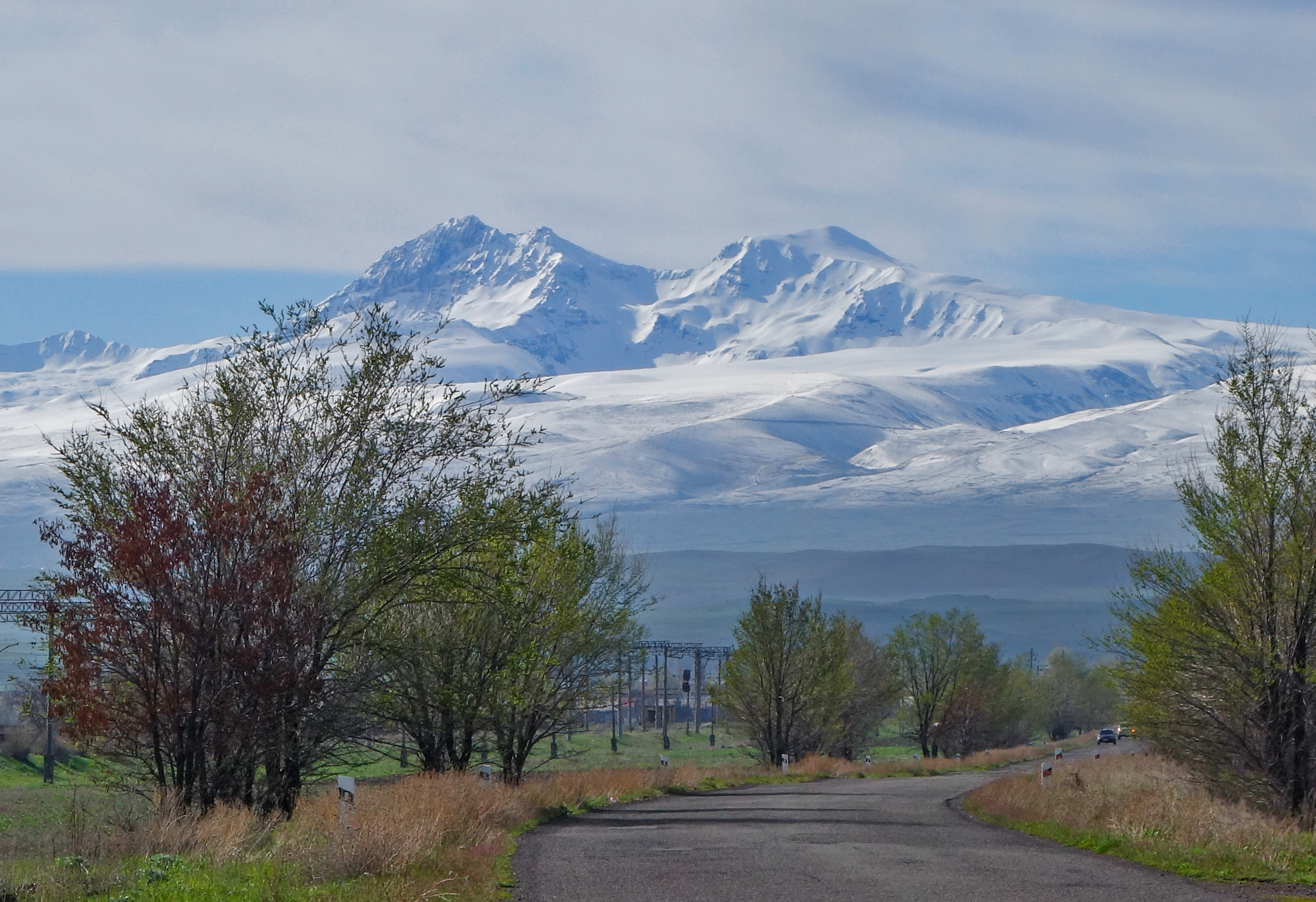

Highest point
- Elevation: 4,090 m (13,420 ft)
- Prominence: 2,143 m (7,031 ft)
- Isolation: 88.62 km (55.07 mi)
- Listing: Country high point; Ultra; Ribu
- Coordinates: 40°32′00″N 44°12′00″E

Geography
- Location within Armenia Location within Aragatsotn
- Country: Armenia
- Provinces: Aragatsotn; Shirak
- Towns/villages: Artik; Aparan; Talin; Oshakan; Byurakan
- Parent range: Lesser Caucasus Armenian Highlands

Geology
- Rock age: Holocene
- Mountain type: Stratovolcano
- Last eruption: Unknown

Climbing
- First ascent: July 1843; Khachatur Abovian and Moritz Wagner

Mount Aragats (Armenian: Արագած, pronounced [ɑɾɑˈɡɑt͡s]) is an isolated four-peaked volcano massif in Armenia. Its northern summit, at 4,090 m (13,420 ft) above sea level, is the highest point of the Lesser Caucasus and Armenia. It is also one of the highest points in the Armenian Highlands. (Note: Because the Armenian Highlands is not a well-defined area, sources vary greatly on where Aragats ranks. Some sources call it the second highest (after Mount Ararat in Turkey), others the third highest (after Ararat and Süphan, also in Turkey) and some the fourth highest (after Ararat, Sabalan in Iran, and Süphan).)

The Aragats massif is surrounded by the Kasagh River on the east, the Akhurian River on the west, Ararat Plain on the south, and Shirak Plain on the north. The circumference of the massif is around 200 km (120 mi), and covers an area of 6,000 km^{2} (2,300 sq mi) or around 1/5 of Armenia's total area. (Note: Armenia's territory is 29,743 km^{2}. 6,000 is its 20.2%.) 944 km^{2} (364 sq mi) of the massif is located above 2,000 m (6,600 ft).

== Etymology and names ==
Armenian tradition derives Aragats from Ara and gah, meaning "Ara's throne" in reference to the legendary hero Ara the Handsome. Grigor Ghapantsyan and Hovhannes Karageozyan accepted the traditional account, while in a more recent hypothesis, Armen Petrosyan argued that the second component of Aragats originated from the Indo-European root *weh2g̑- "to smash", and referred to the belief that it was formed or shaped by a divine strike by Ara. Another tradition is attested by the preeminent historian Movses Khorenatsi in his History of Armenia, who derives Aragats from Aramaneak, the son of Hayk, the legendary patriarch of the Armenian people. Aramaneak called his possessions "the foot of Aragats" (Old Armenian: ոտն Արագածոյ, romanized: otn Aragatsoy or Արագածոտն, Aragatsotn). The modern Aragatsotn Province, dominated by the mountain, was formed in 1995.

Another, more recent, name for the mountain is Alagöz (Russian: Алагёз), sometimes spelled Alagheuz, which literally means "variegated eye" in Turkish and Azerbaijani. This term was widely used up until the mid-20th century in European, Tsarist Russian, and early Soviet sources. Another version, Alagyaz (Ալագյազ), has been used in Armenian. (Note: A folk song from Shirak composed by Komitas is titled Alagyaz.) A village on the foot of Aragats is named Alagyaz.

== Geography and geology ==
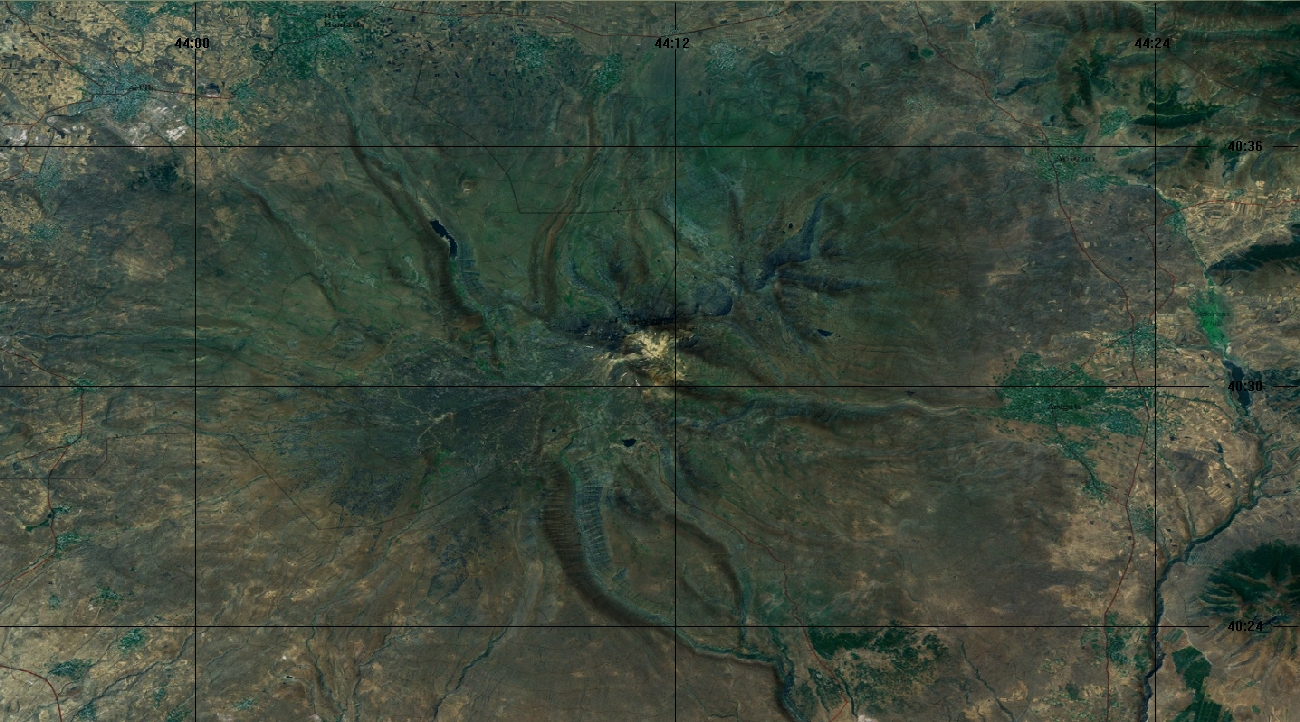
Mount Aragats, topographic representation

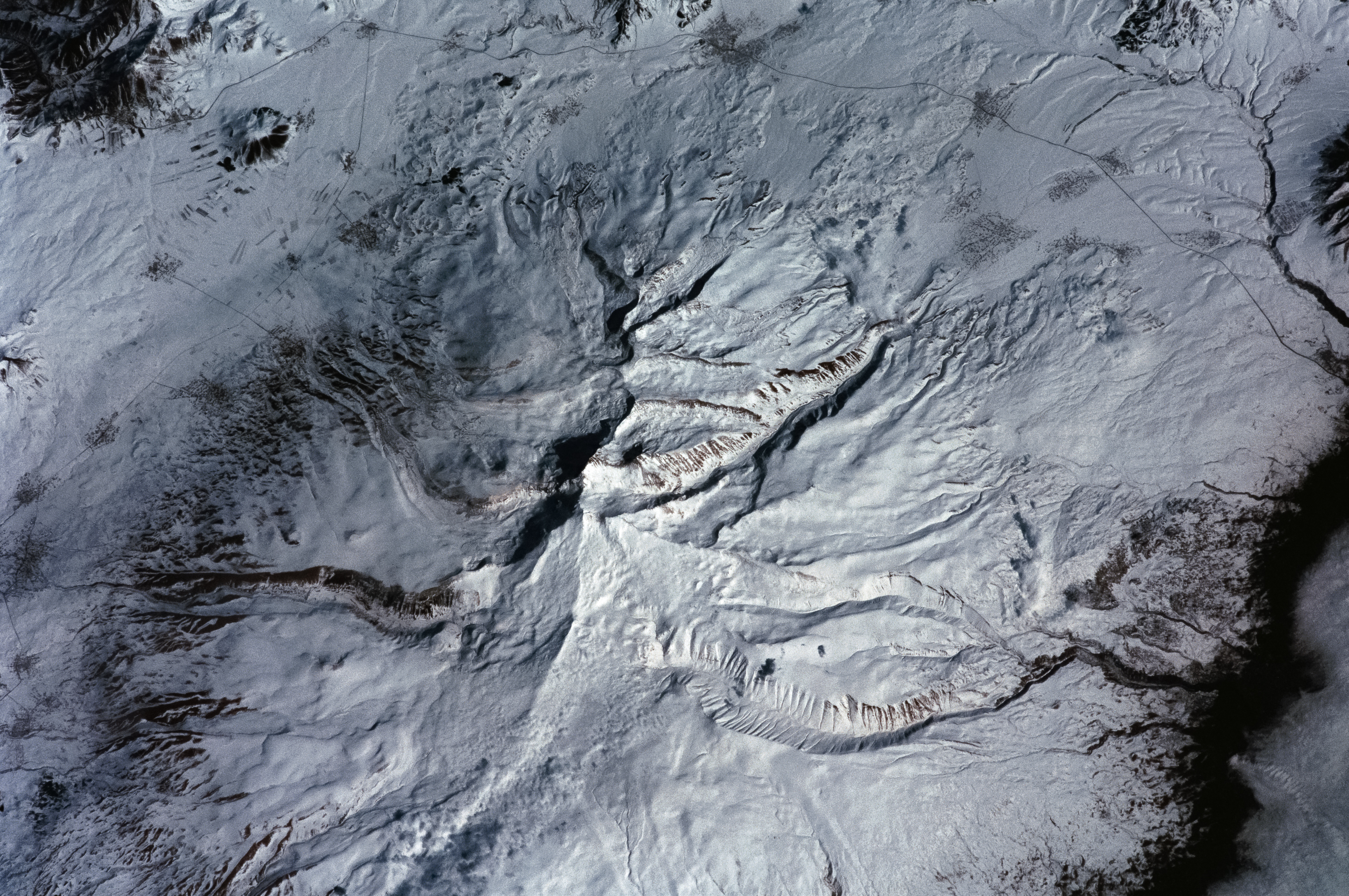
Aerial view of Aragats: a 2001 photo from the International Space Station

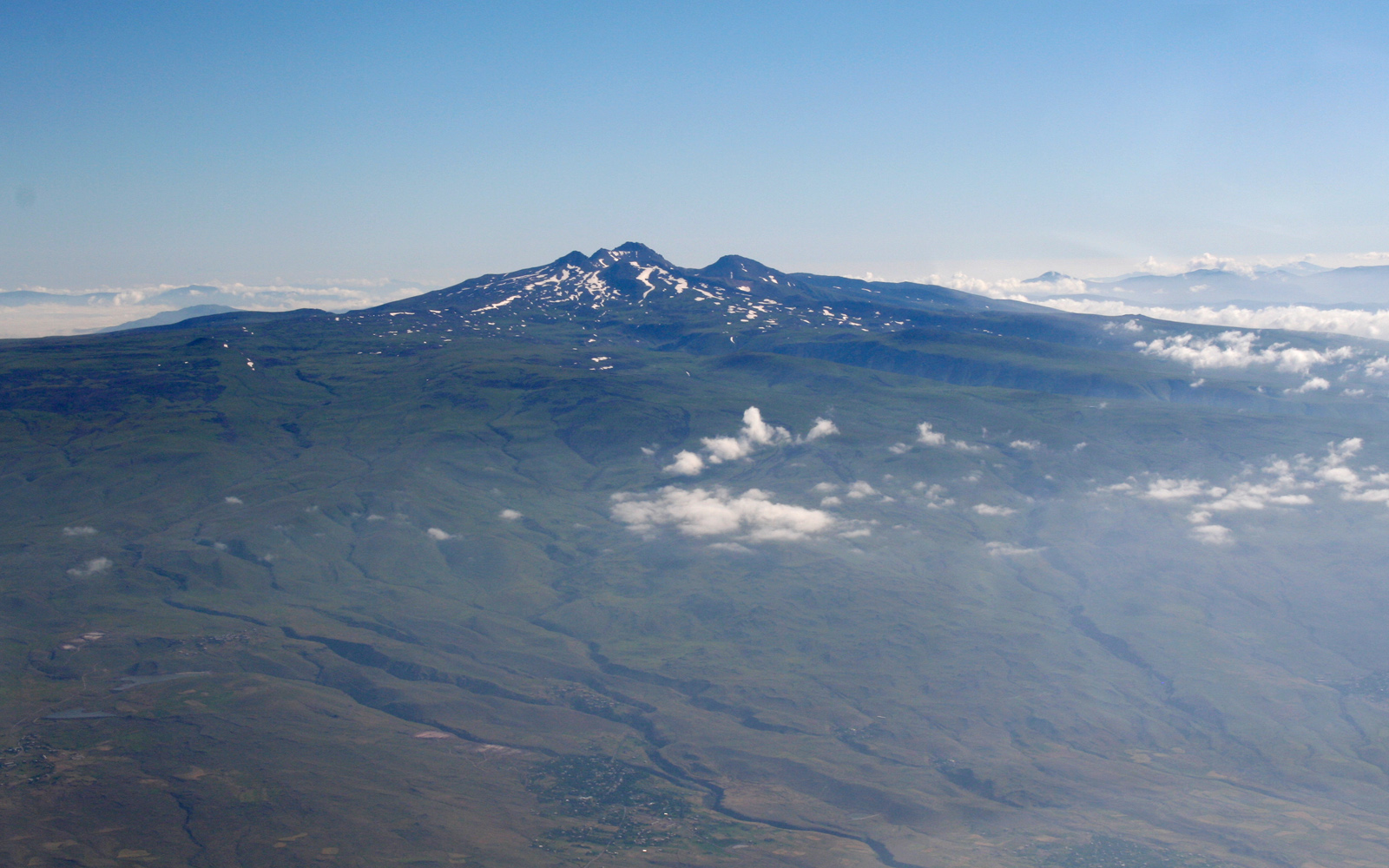

Aragats is isolated from Armenia's other mountain ranges. However, it is considered part and the highest point of the larger Lesser Caucasus mountain range. It has four summits, which are named according to their relative geographic position:

- Northern—4,090 m (13,420 ft)
- Western—3,995 m (13,107 ft)
- Eastern—3,908 m (12,822 ft)
- Southern—3,888 m (12,756 ft)

Mount Aragats has a topographic prominence of 2,143 meters, more than some higher mountains, such as Dykh-Tau (5,205 m high) in the Russian part of Great Caucasus Range.

Situated 40 kilometres (25 mi) northwest of the Armenian capital Yerevan, Aragats is a large volcano with numerous fissure vents and adventive cones. Numerous large lava flows descend from the volcano and are constrained in age between the middle Pleistocene and 3,000 BCE. The summit crater is cut by a 13 kilometres (8.1 mi) long line of cones which generated possibly Holocene-age lahars and lava flow. The volcanic system covers an area of 5,000 km^{2} and is one of the largest in the region. More recent activity in flank centers occurred in Tirinkatar (0.48-0.61 Ma), Kakavasar, (0.52-0.54 Ma), and Ashtarak (0.58 Ma), as well as Jrbazhan in the summit area (0.52 Ma). The magmas feeding Aragats are unusually hot for arc-derived magmas, resulting in long and voluminous lava flows.

=== Glaciation ===
Shortly after World War II, observations noted the presence of firn fields and snowfields on the sides of the crater cirque as well as moraines and glaciers inside the crater. An analysis in 1896 indicated a surface area of 5.5-5.8 km^{2}, but it rapidly retreated afterward. The glaciation has been retreating on account of insufficient snowfall and increasing temperatures. Glacial meltwater dominates the upper part of the rivers descending from Aragats but its importance decreases farther down the valleys. Traces of prehistorical glaciation also exist including thick moraines in the summit area at an altitude of 2,600–3,000 m.

=== Climate ===
Climate data for Mount Aragats (3227 m) (1981–2010 normals, extremes 1929–2010)
| Month | Jan | Feb | Mar | Apr | May | Jun | Jul | Aug | Sep | Oct | Nov | Dec | Year |
|---|---|---|---|---|---|---|---|---|---|---|---|---|---|
| Record high °C (°F) | 6.2 (43.2) | 5.0 (41.0) | 7.1 (44.8) | 10.6 (51.1) | 11.8 (53.2) | 16.2 (61.2) | 22.1 (71.8) | 21.0 (69.8) | 18.6 (65.5) | 13.0 (55.4) | 10.4 (50.7) | 5.6 (42.1) | 22.1 (71.8) |
| Mean daily maximum °C (°F) | −9.3 (15.3) | −8.8 (16.2) | −5.8 (21.6) | −1.3 (29.7) | 2.6 (36.7) | 8.0 (46.4) | 13.1 (55.6) | 13.4 (56.1) | 9.6 (49.3) | 3.0 (37.4) | −3.8 (25.2) | −7.7 (18.1) | 1.1 (34.0) |
| Daily mean °C (°F) | −12.4 (9.7) | −12.4 (9.7) | −9.8 (14.4) | −5.0 (23.0) | −0.7 (30.7) | 4.7 (40.5) | 9.3 (48.7) | 9.4 (48.9) | 5.8 (42.4) | −0.1 (31.8) | −6.4 (20.5) | −10.3 (13.5) | −2.3 (27.9) |
| Mean daily minimum °C (°F) | −15.9 (3.4) | −16.4 (2.5) | −14.1 (6.6) | −8.3 (17.1) | −3.8 (25.2) | 0.9 (33.6) | 5.5 (41.9) | 5.2 (41.4) | 1.7 (35.1) | −3.7 (25.3) | −9.6 (14.7) | −13.9 (7.0) | −6.0 (21.2) |
| Record low °C (°F) | −33.6 (−28.5) | −33.0 (−27.4) | −30.5 (−22.9) | −25.9 (−14.6) | −20.1 (−4.2) | −13.3 (8.1) | −6.0 (21.2) | −5.8 (21.6) | −11.7 (10.9) | −22.0 (−7.6) | −28.2 (−18.8) | −31.6 (−24.9) | −33.6 (−28.5) |
| Average precipitation mm (inches) | 72.8 (2.87) | 93.8 (3.69) | 86.1 (3.39) | 101.9 (4.01) | 87.9 (3.46) | 66.2 (2.61) | 64.9 (2.56) | 46.2 (1.82) | 33.2 (1.31) | 66.4 (2.61) | 78.1 (3.07) | 78.6 (3.09) | 876.1 (34.49) |
| Average precipitation days (≥ 1 mm) | 7.9 | 9.2 | 9.3 | 11.3 | 10.4 | 8.1 | 7.0 | 6.1 | 5.0 | 8.0 | 7.9 | 7.3 | 97.3 |
| Mean monthly sunshine hours | 133.2 | 127.2 | 156.3 | 150.2 | 193.6 | 260.9 | 283.8 | 273.5 | 244.8 | 174.8 | 144.9 | 128.9 | 2,272.1 |
| Percentage possible sunshine | 45 | 43 | 43 | 38 | 44 | 59 | 63 | 65 | 67 | 52 | 50 | 45 | 52 |
Source 1: WMO
Source 2: ECA&D (average high and low, extremes)

== History ==
=== Geological ===
The volcano was constructed in four different phases. The first phase (possibly 2.5 Ma) occurred in the main crater and subsidiary vents and was basaltic andesite in composition. It crops out in deep gorges. The second phase (0.97–0.89 Ma, by K–Ar) involved the main vent, and subsidiary structures and was basaltic and andesitic in composition with ignimbrites and pyroclastic, with tuffs and lava flows emanating from satellite centers. It was the most voluminous and included the Shamiram and Yeghvard subsidiary centres. The third phase (0.74–0.68 Ma) while similar to the second was more restricted in regional extent to the Mantash River basin. The fourth stage (0.56–0.45 Ma) involved mafic lava flows from parasitic vents in the southern parts of the volcano.

=== Cultural ===
Numerous engravings have been made around the volcano, including rock paintings portraying animals and human-like figures in the Kasagh River valley possibly dating to the early Holocene, and in Aghavnatun on the southern side of the volcano including petroglyphs showing animals that were possibly created in the 4th to 1st millennia BCE.

According to an ancient Armenian legend, Aragats and Mount Ararat were loving sisters who parted after a quarrel and separated permanently. Another legend tells that Gregory the Illuminator, who converted Armenia to Christianity in the early 4th century, "used to pray on the peak of the mountain. At nighttime an icon lamp shone to give light to him, the lamp hanging from heaven using no rope. Some say that the icon lamp is still there, but only the worthy ones can see it."

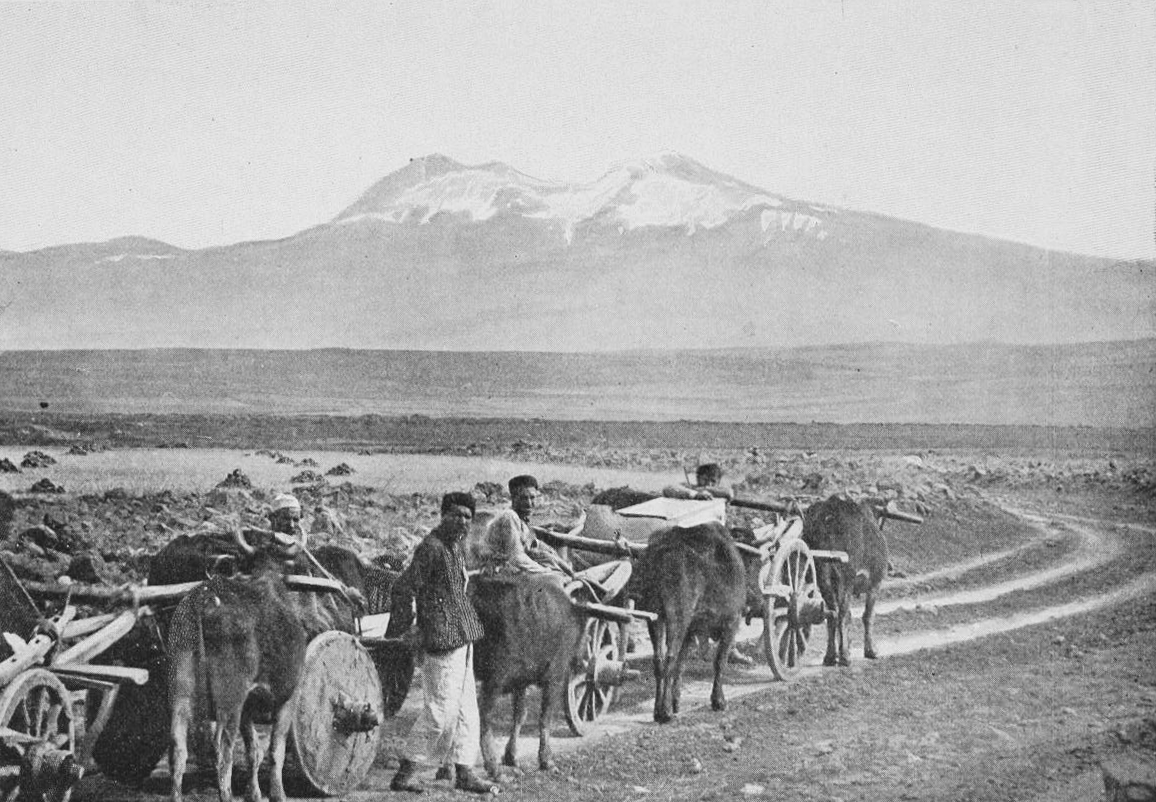
Aragats from the Shirak Plain, probably in 1901

In 1935, on the 15th anniversary of Armenia's Sovietization, around one thousand people climbed the summit of Aragats from five directions. On May 28, 2005—the anniversary of the establishment of the First Republic of Armenia—around 250,000 people participated in a Dance of Unity (Armenian: Միասնության շուրջպար) around Mount Aragats in a mass display of national unity. The quarter million participants, among them then-President Robert Kocharyan and Defense Minister Serzh Sargsyan, formed a 163-kilometre (101 mi) ring around the mountain after a blessing from Catholicos Karekin II. The organizers hoped the event would be included in the Guinness World Records. Prior to the dance, some 110,000 trees were planted on the slopes of Aragats.

== Nearby settlements ==
The following settlements are located on the slopes or foot of Aragats: Ashtarak, Artik, Aparan, Talin, Oshakan, Byurakan.

== Main sights ==
=== Historic and cultural sites ===
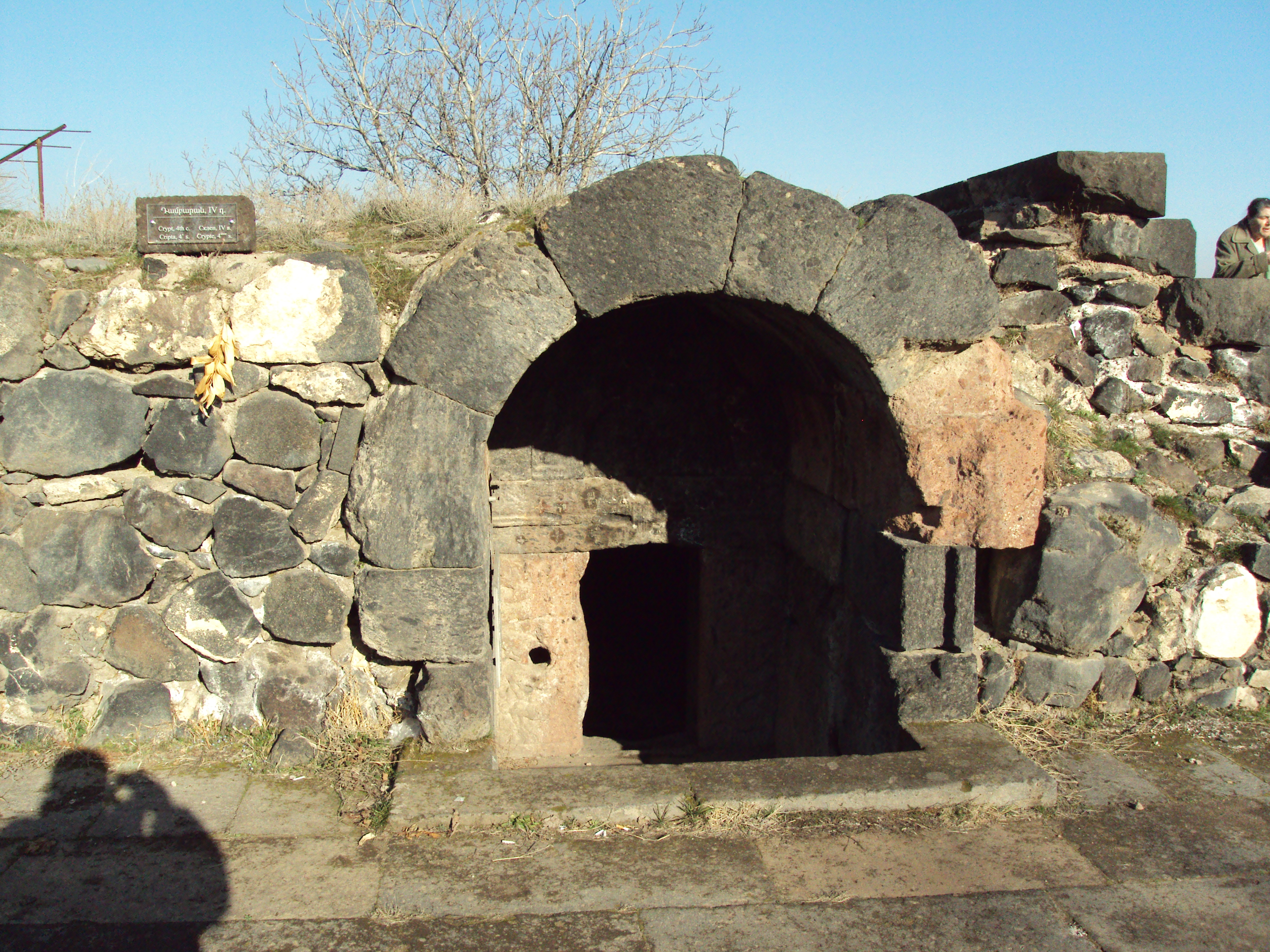
Arshakid Mausoleum.

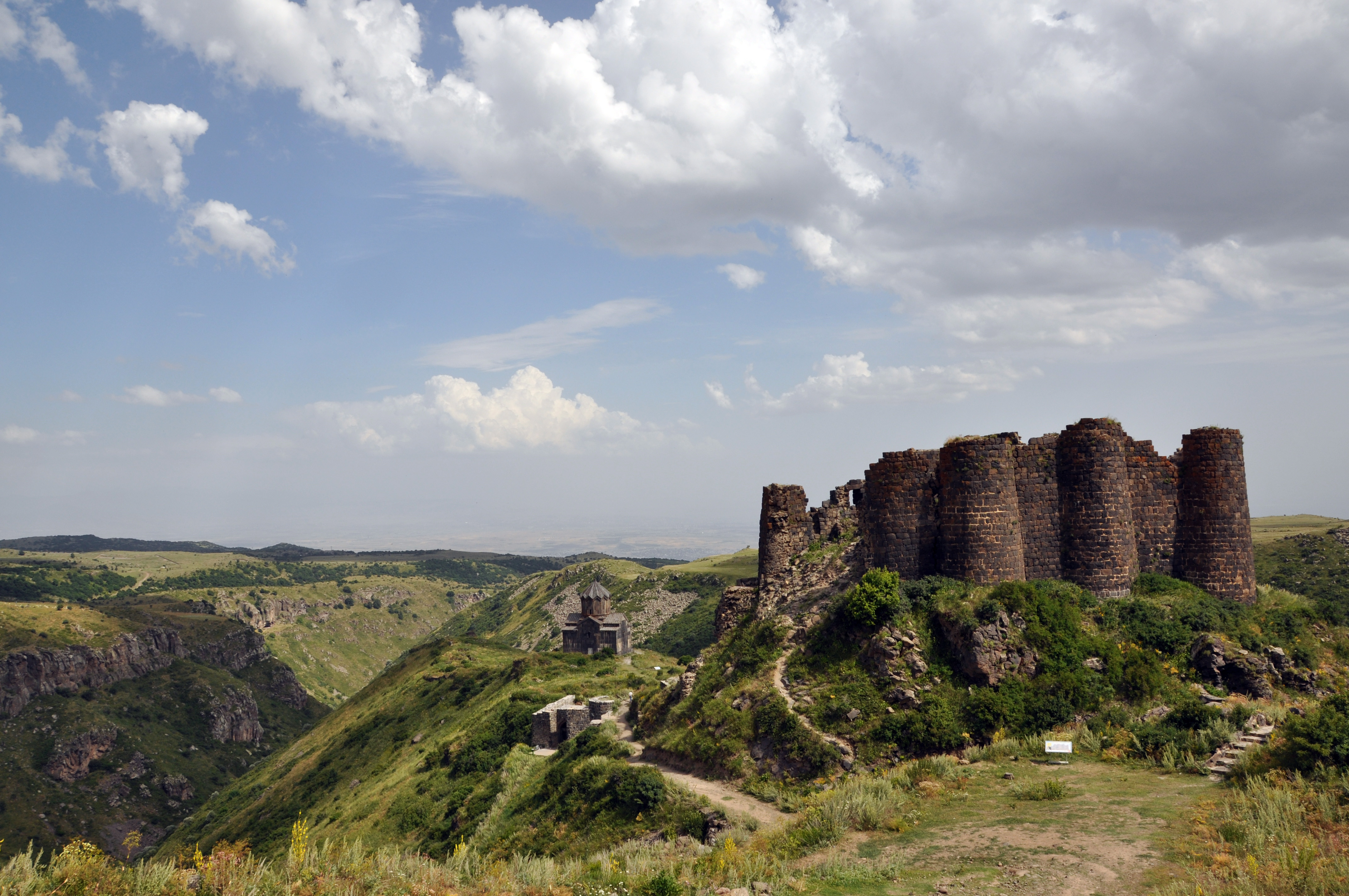
Amberd and Vahramashen Church.

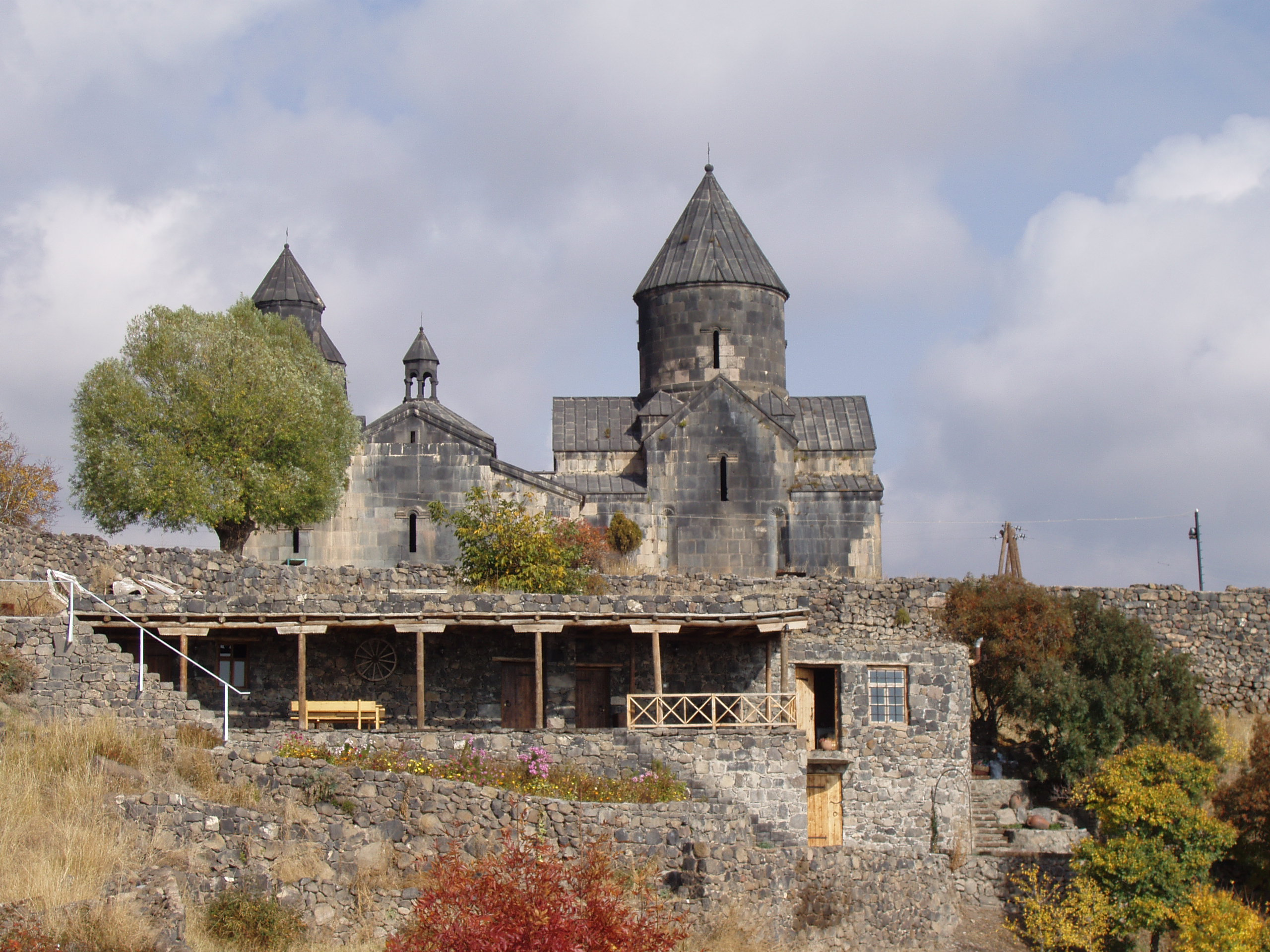
Tegher Monastery.

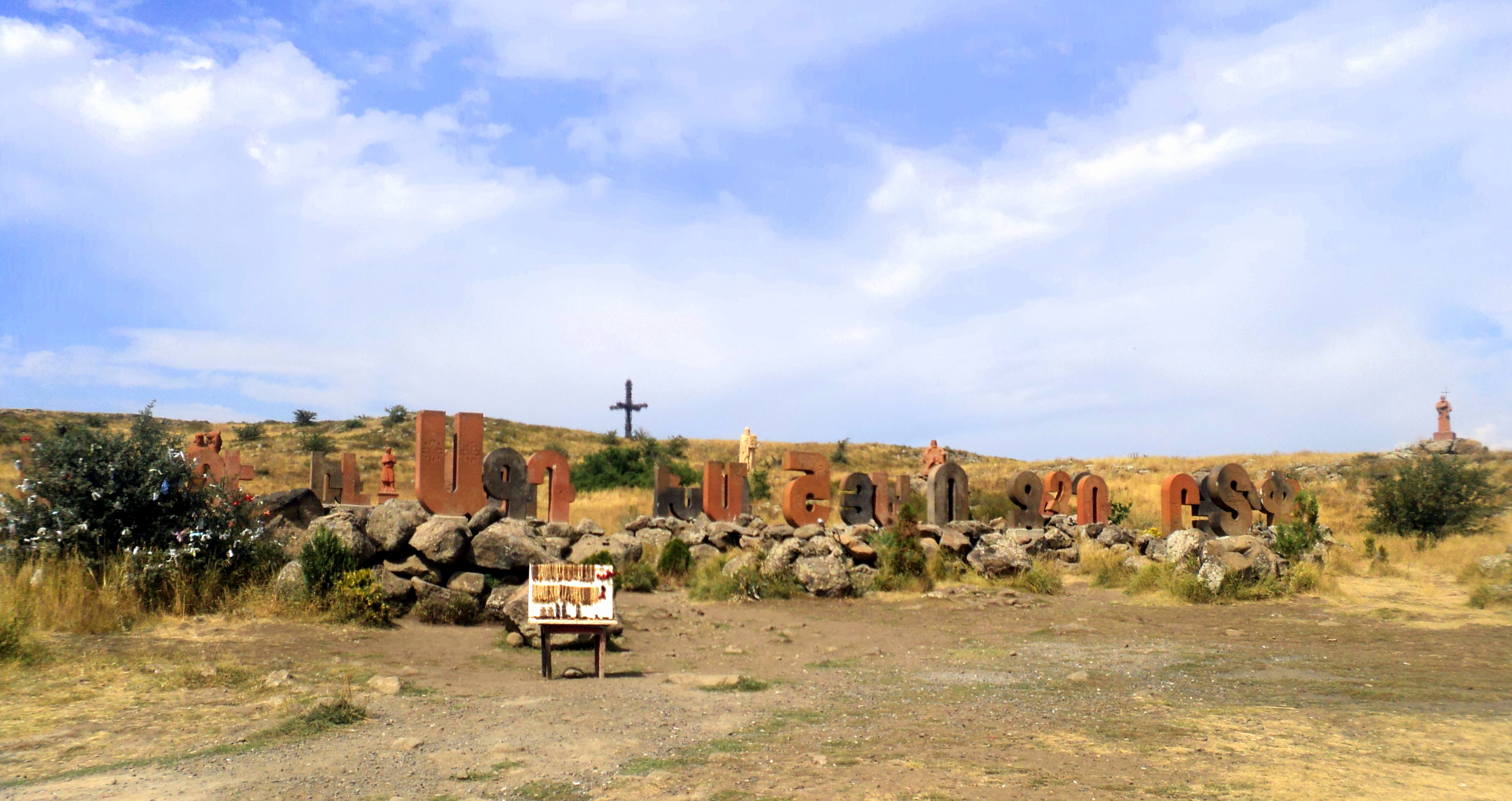
Alphabet park.

Aragats has historically played a significant role in Armenian history and culture. Numerous historical and modern monuments are located on its slopes, some of which are listed below.

The 4th-century mausoleum of the Arsacid (Arshakuni) dynasty is located in the village of Aghtsk, on the slopes of Aragats.

The early medieval fortress of Amberd and the nearby 11th-century Vahramashen Church are located on the slopes of Aragats, at an altitude of 2,300 m (7,500 ft). One source calls Amberd the "biggest and the best preserved fortress" in modern-day Armenia.

The Alphabet Park (Tar’eri purak) is located near the village of Artashavan. It was founded in 2005 on the 1600th anniversary of the invention of the Armenian alphabet. It features sculptures of the 39 letters of the Armenian alphabet and statues of notable Armenians, such as Mesrop Mashtots (the inventor of the alphabet), Armenia's national poet Hovhannes Tumanyan, Khachatur Abovian (father of modern Eastern Armenian literature), and others. In 2012, a 33-metre (108 ft) high cross, composed of 1711 large and small iron crosses, symbolizing the number of years since Armenia's conversion to Christianity in 301, was installed on a hill near the park. A cross is added on an annual basis.

=== Scientific institutions ===
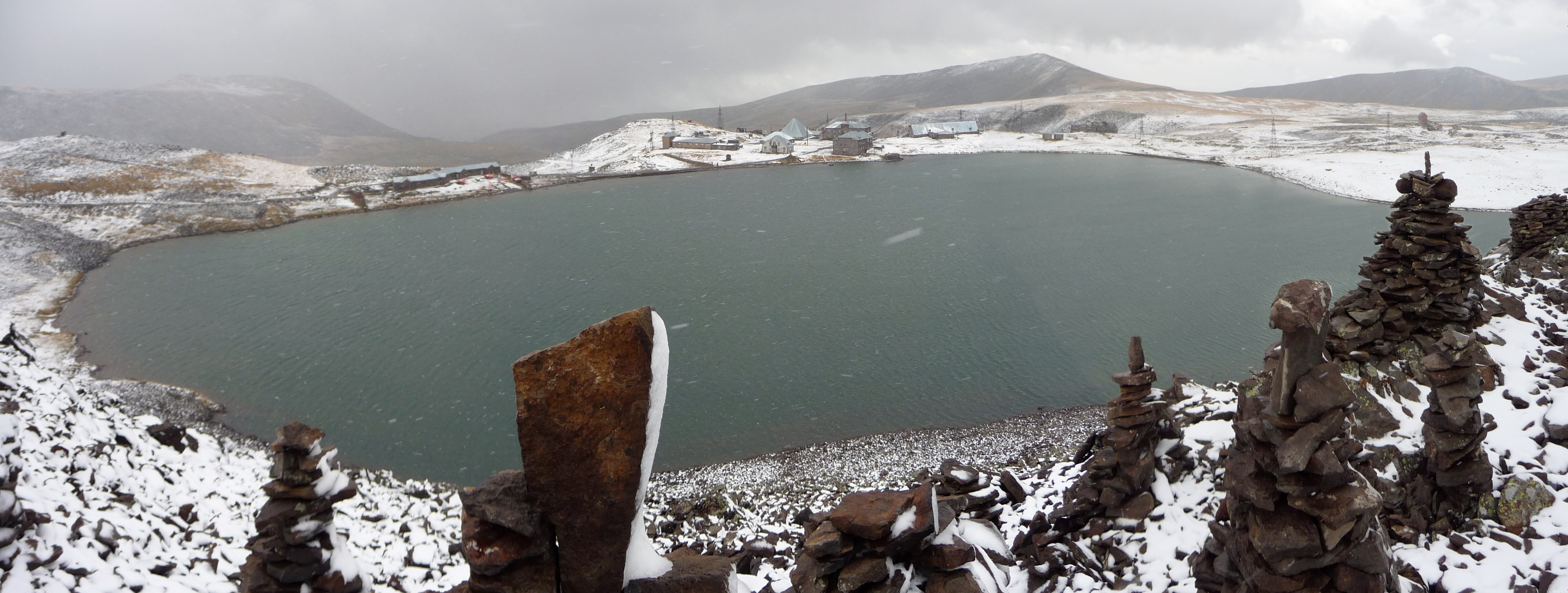
Lake Kari and the Aragats Cosmic Ray Research Station (in the background).

The Aragats Cosmic Ray Research Station is a cosmic-ray observatory near Lake Kari, at around 3,200 m (10,500 ft) above sea level. It was founded in 1943 by the brothers Artem Alikhanian and Abram Alikhanov. The Nor-Amberd station, built in 1960, is located at 2,000 m (6,600 ft).

The Byurakan Observatory, established in 1946 by Victor Ambartsumian, is located on the southern slopes of Aragats, near the village of Byurakan, at an altitude of 1,405 m (4,610 ft). It made Armenia one of the world's centers for the study of astrophysics in the 20th century.

The ROT-54/2.6, a radio telescope built in 1985 by the radiophysicist Paris Herouni in the village of Orgov, on the slopes of Aragats.

=== Gravity hill ===
On the highway leading to fortress Amberd is a gravity hill, which has become a tourist attraction, due to an optical illusion leading to a downhill slope appearing to be uphill.

=== Mount Aragats hike ===
Mount Aragats is a popular hiking destination among locals and tourists. The southern, lowest peak is the most visited one. The hiking trail is approximately 5 kilometers long, and it typically takes between 2.5 and 3 hours to complete.

== In culture ==
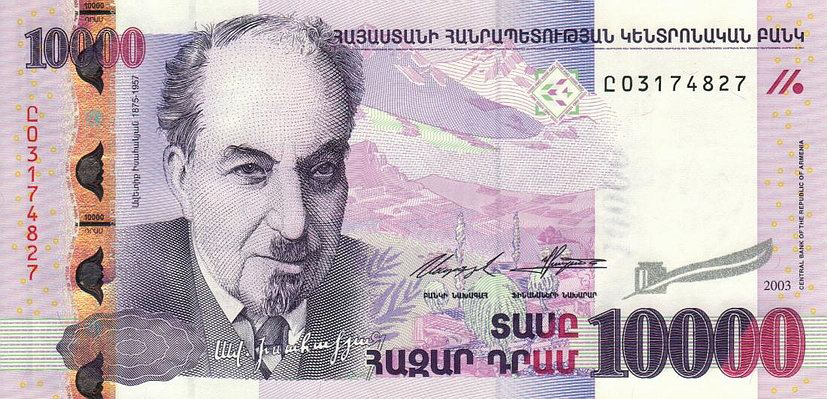
The obverse side of the 10,000 Armenian dram banknote depicts Aragats and poet Avetik Isahakyan.

Mount Aragats plays a special role in Armenian history and culture. Along with Mount Ararat, it is considered a sacred mountain for the Armenians.

Aragats is a male first name in Armenia, used especially in areas surrounding the mountain. (Note: Two examples of notable people named Aragats include Aragats Akhoyan, member of the parliament, born in Dzorap. and Aragats Mkrtchyan, a veteran of the First Nagorno-Karabakh War, from Talin. Both of these settlements are located in the Aragatsotn Province.)

Mt. Aragats is often associated with Gyumri, Armenia's second-largest city. The mountain is depicted on the coat of arms of Gyumri. It is also depicted on the obverse side of the 10,000 Armenian dram banknote (in use since 2003) in the background of Avetik Isahakyan, a poet born in Gyumri.

Numerous Armenian poets (e.g., Avetik Isahakyan) have written about Aragats. Marietta Shaginyan compared Aragats to a "half-open bud of a giant pomegranate flower". In one short poem, Silva Kaputikyan compares Armenia to an "ancient rock-carved fortress", the towers of which are Mount Aragats and Mount Ararat.

=== In visual art ===
Numerous artists have painted Aragats. Some examples of paintings of Aragats are kept at the National Gallery of Armenia.

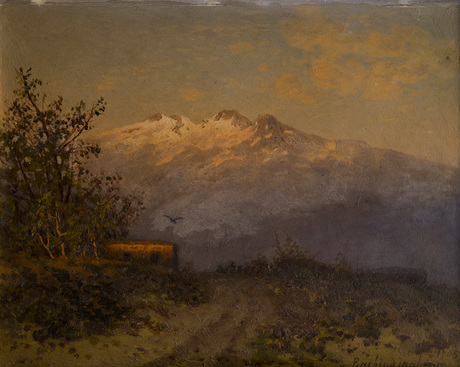
Gevorg Bashinjaghian, 1905

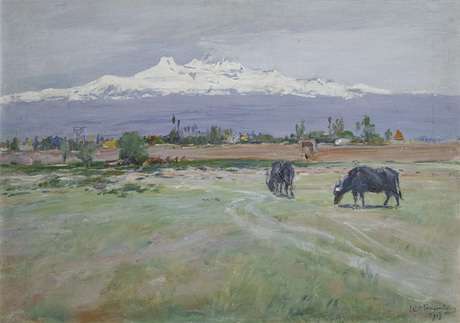
Yeghishe Tadevosyan, 1917

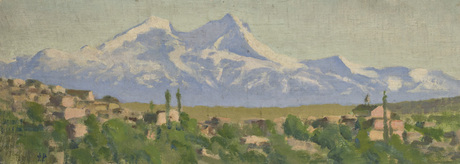
Panos Terlemezian, probably 1941

== Gallery ==
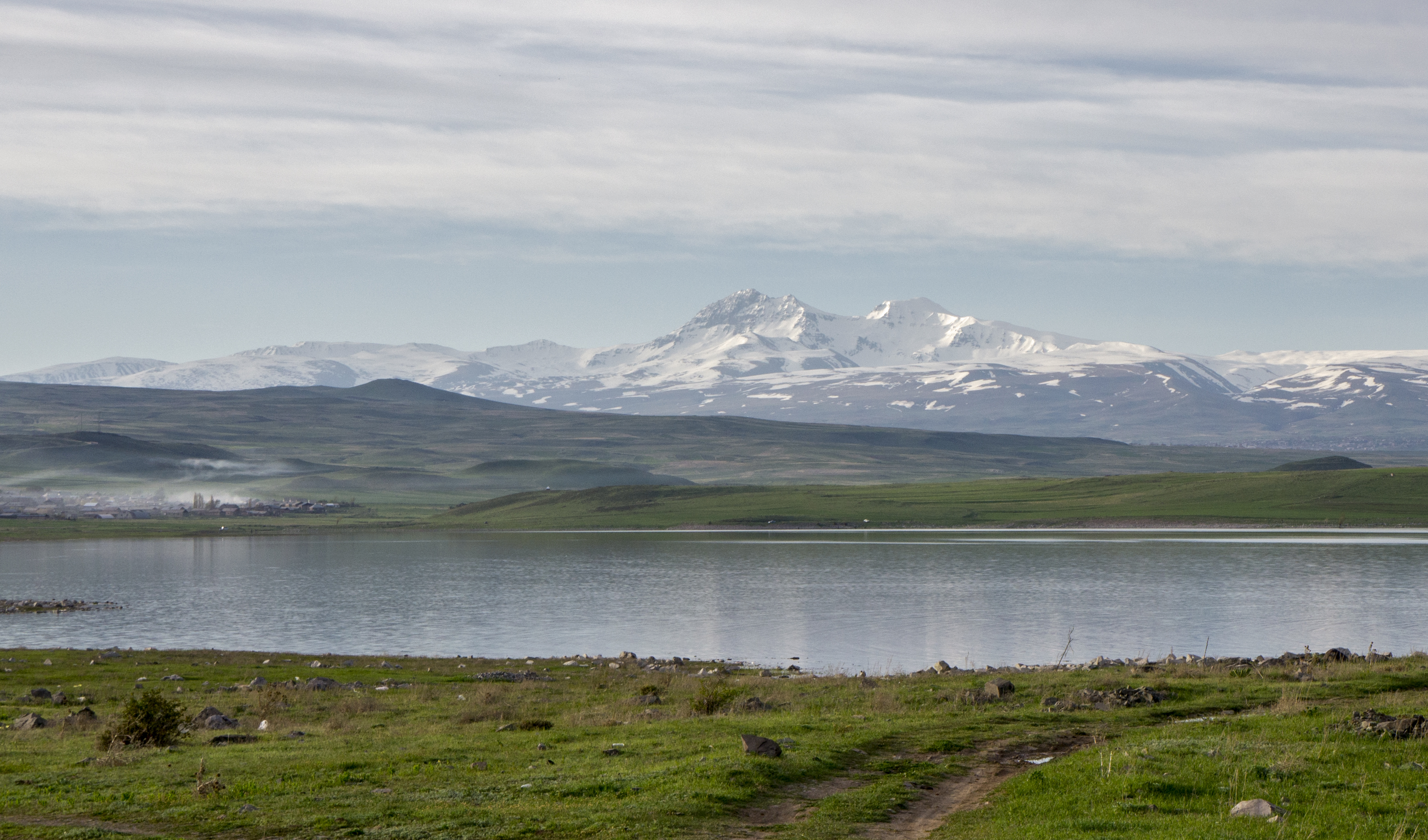

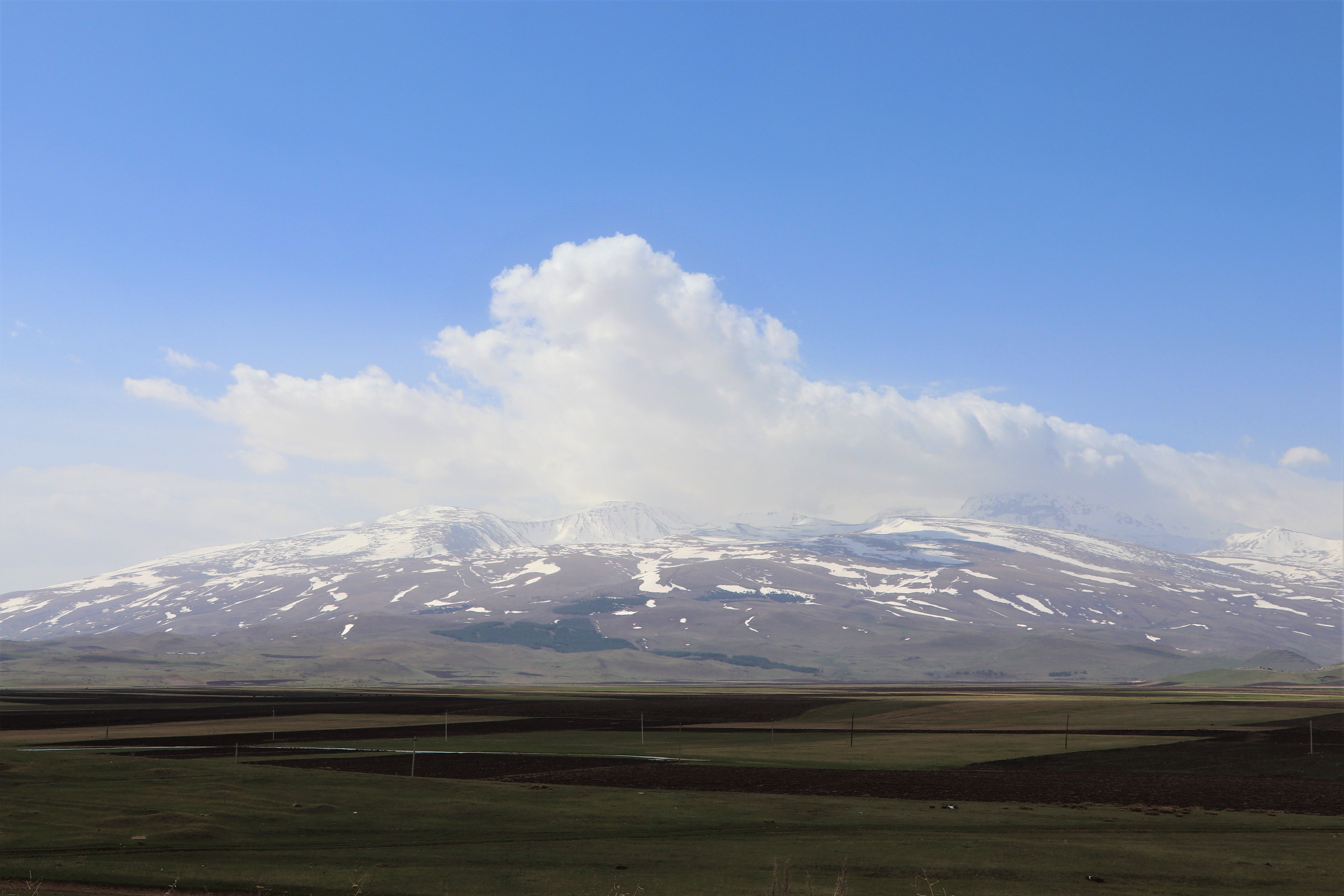

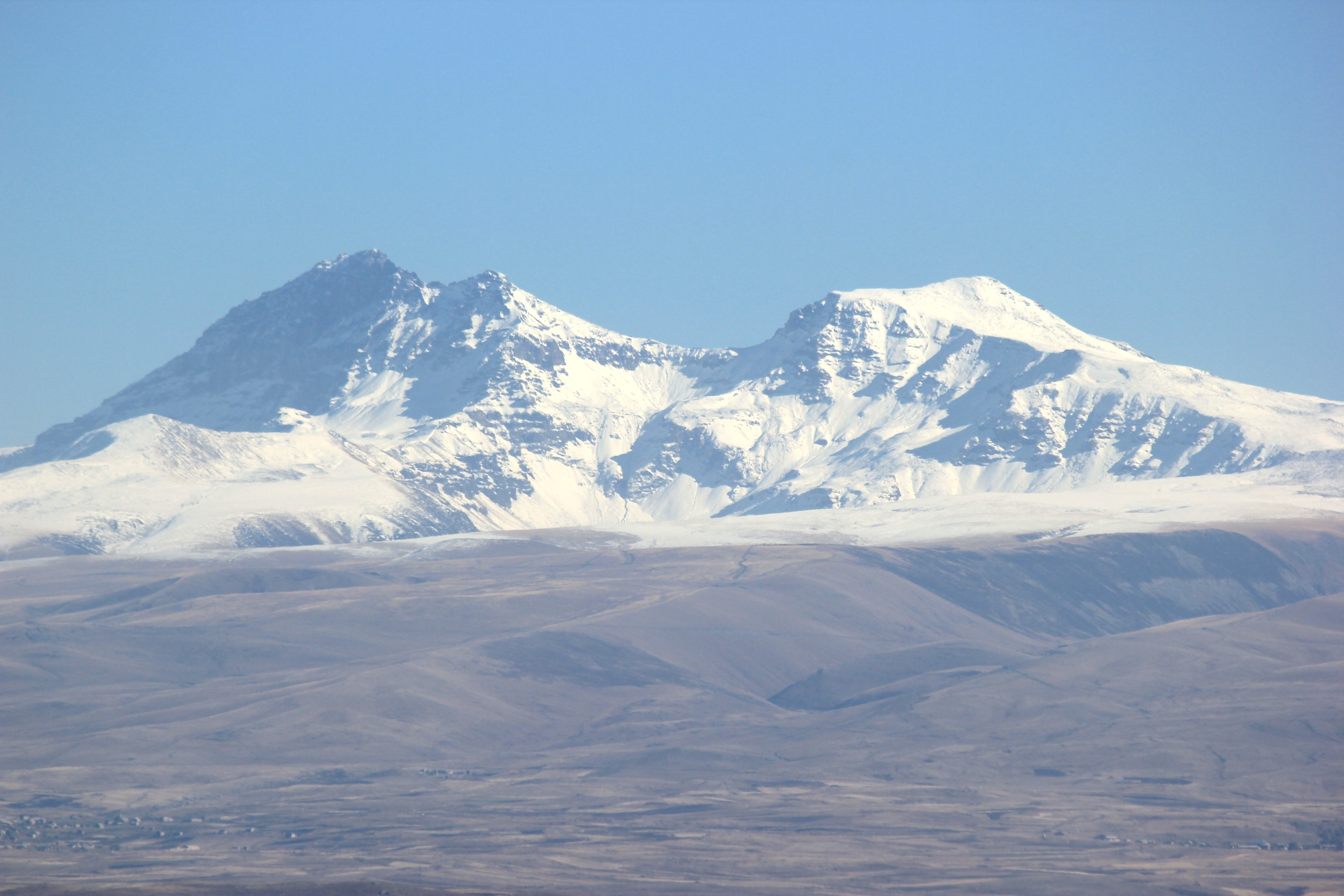

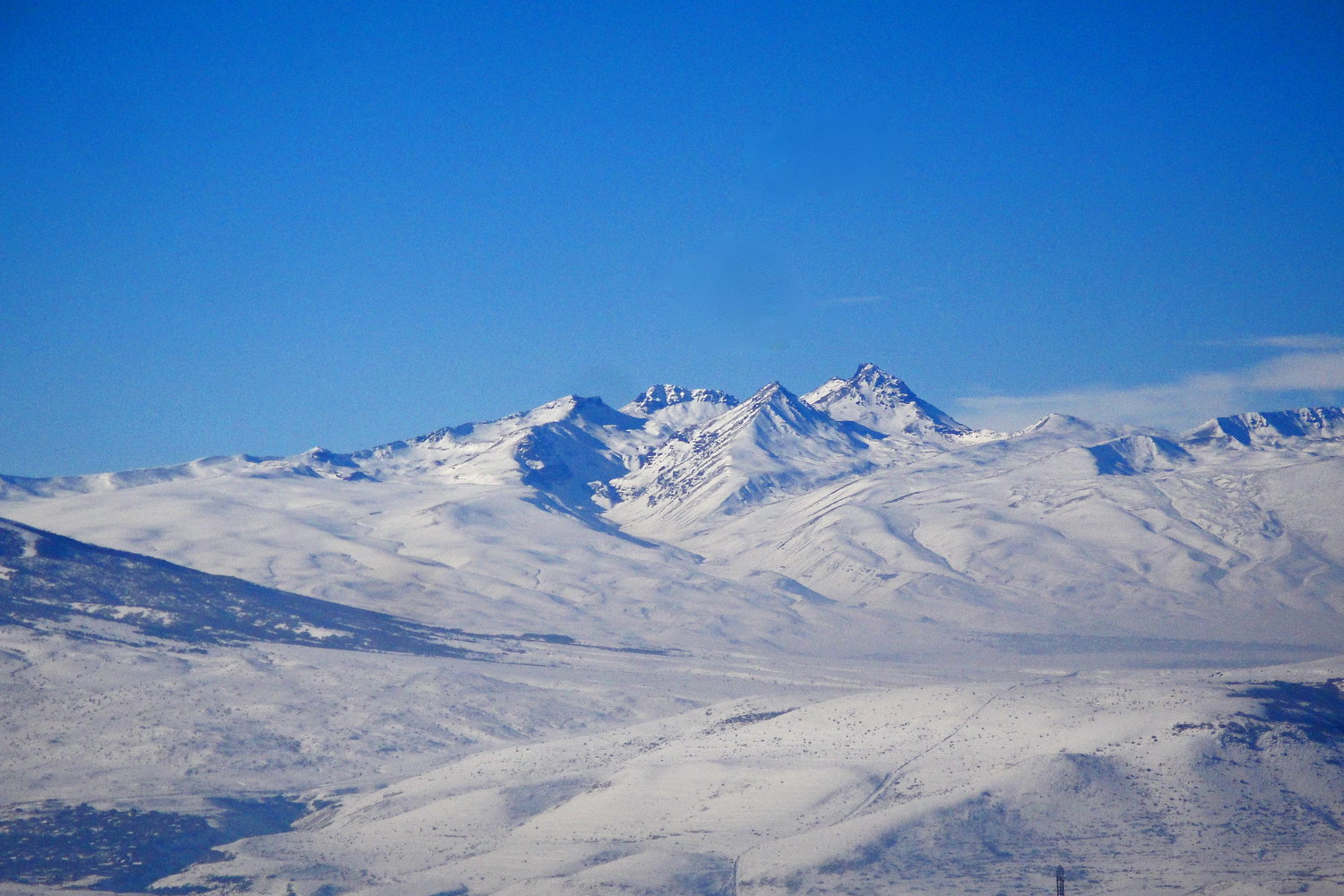

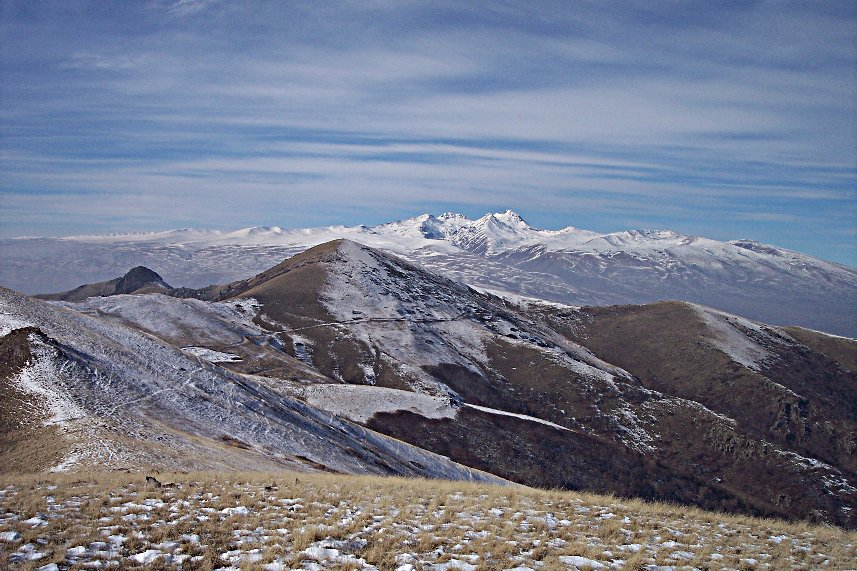

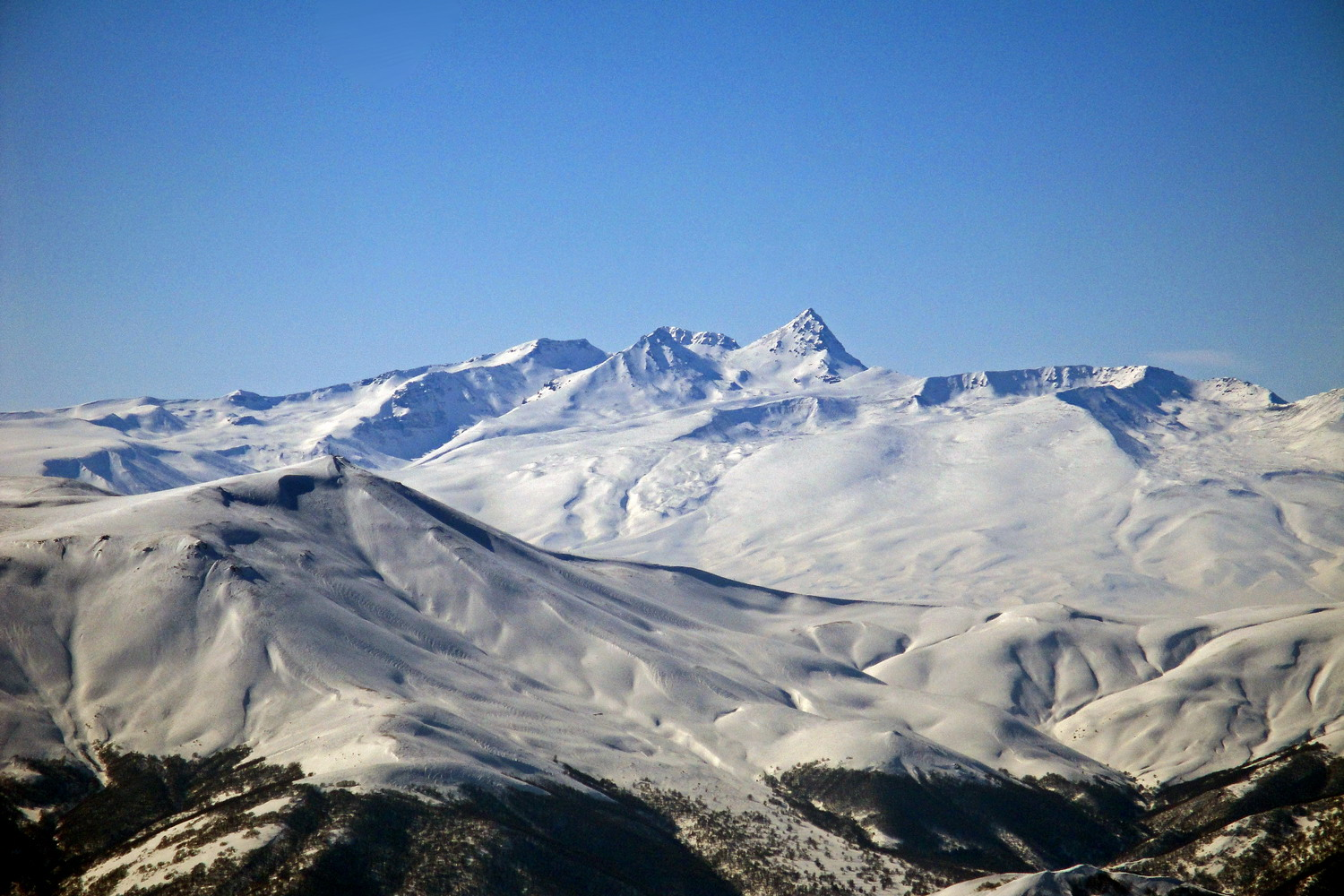

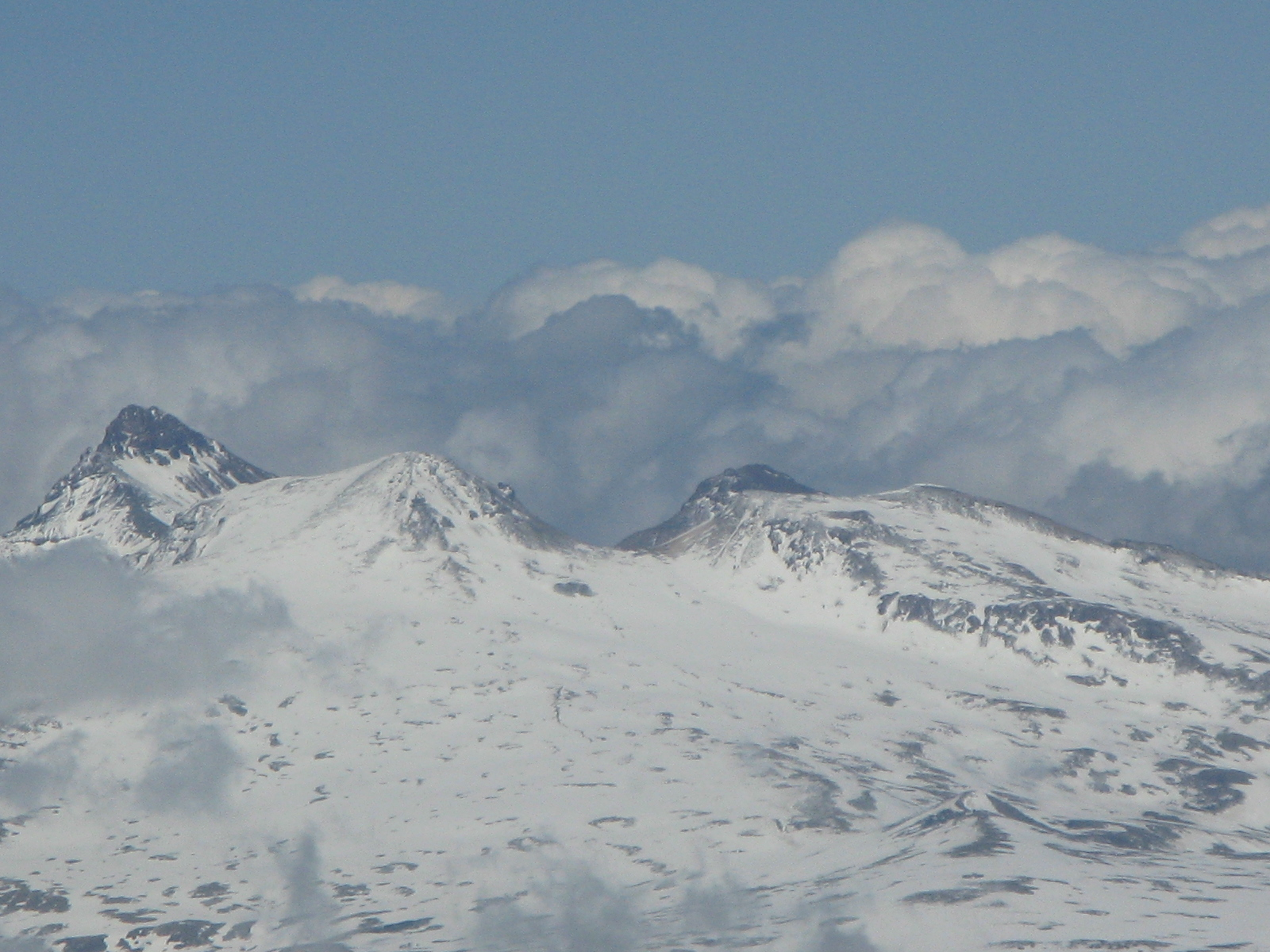

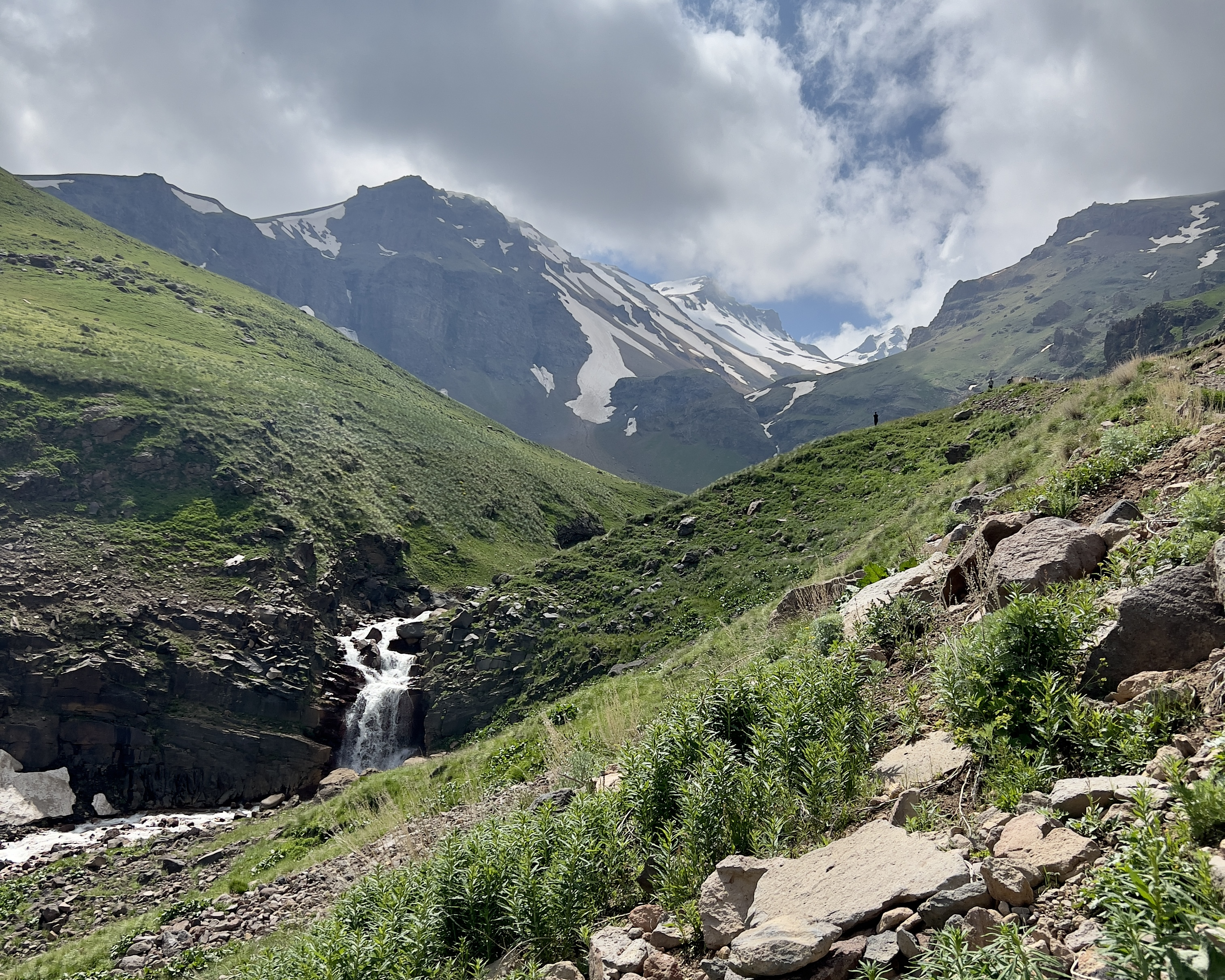

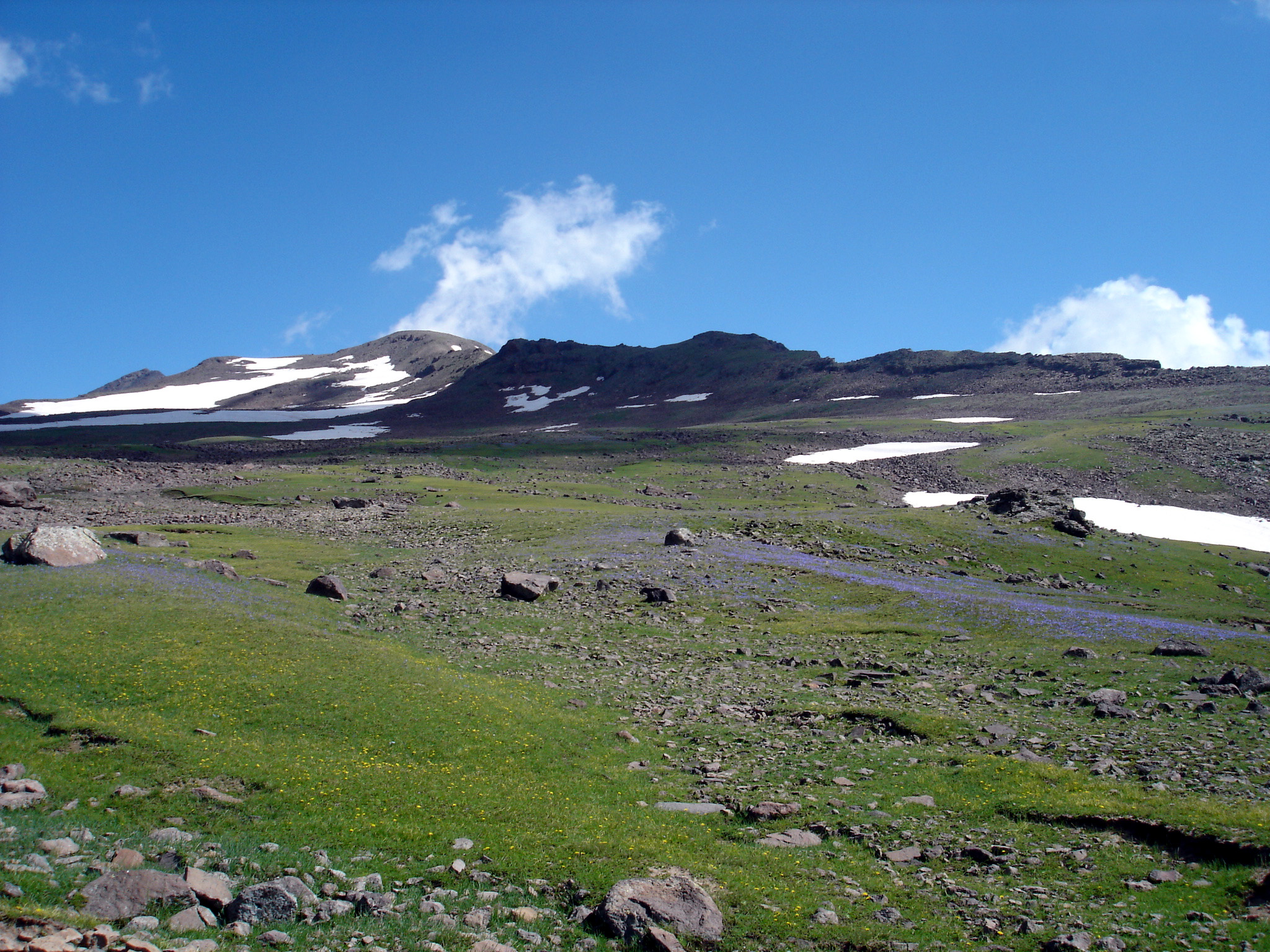

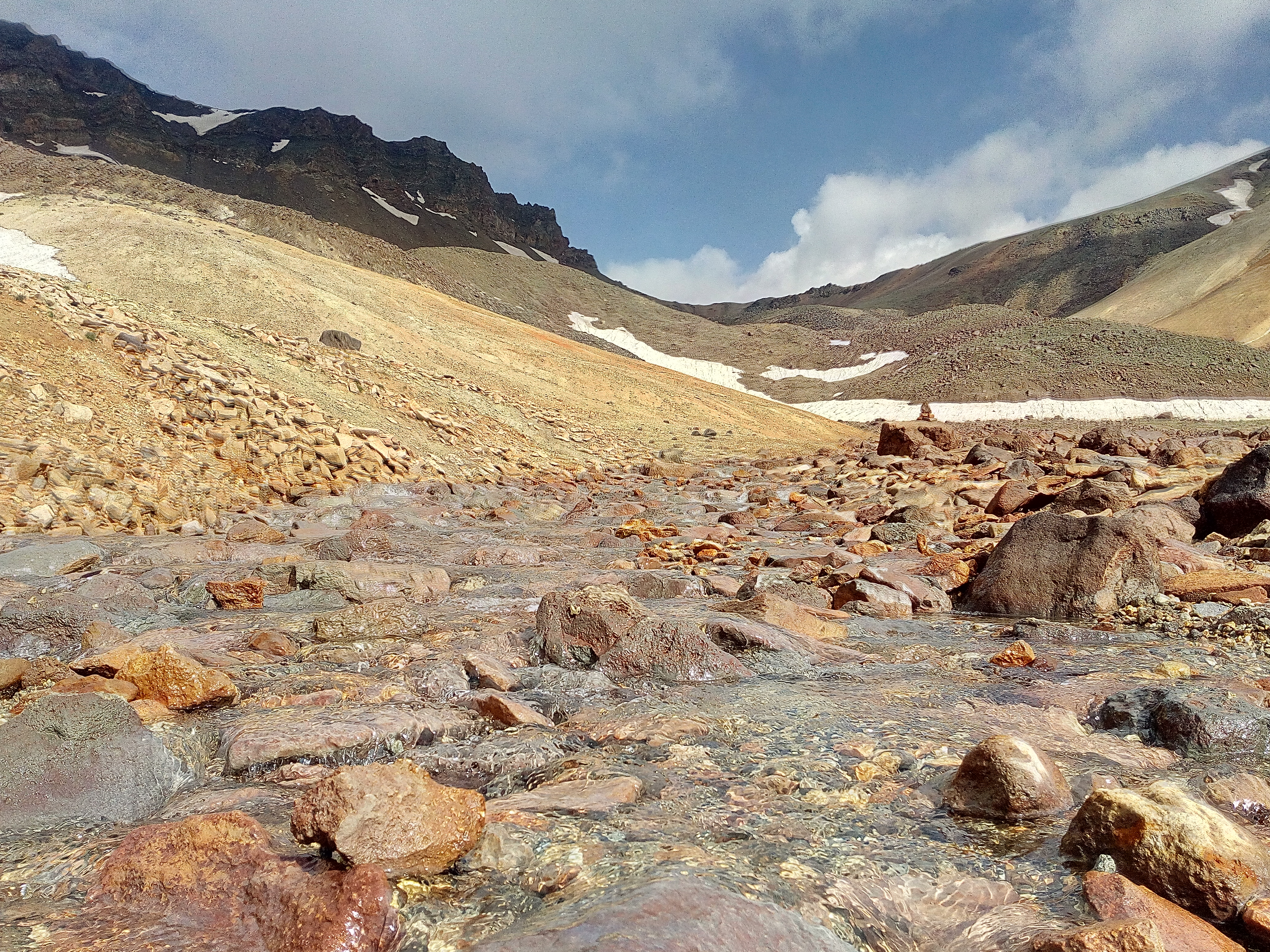

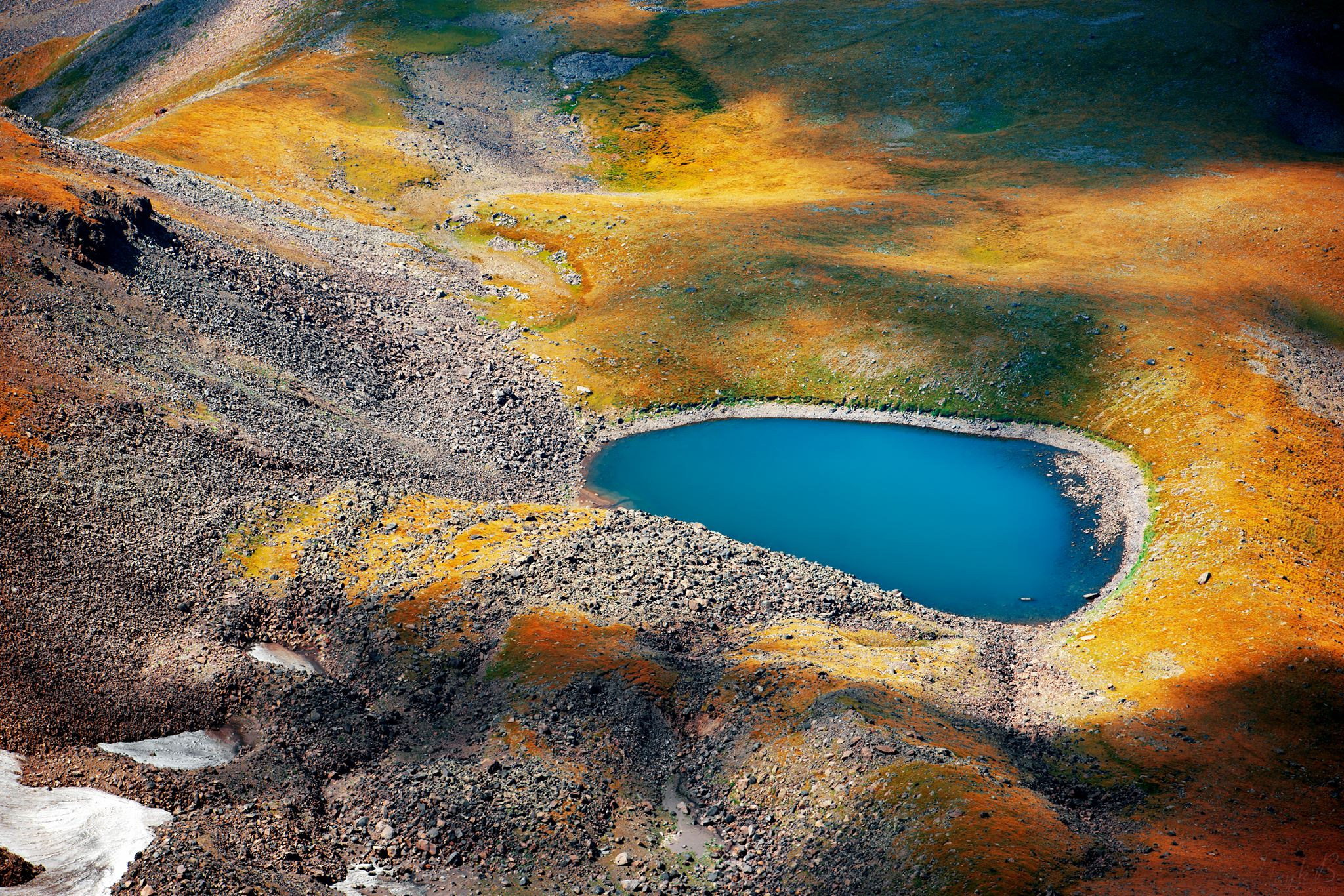

== See also ==
- Lake Kari
- List of volcanoes in Armenia
- List of elevation extremes by country

== Sources ==
- Adalian, Rouben Paul (2010). Historical Dictionary of Armenia. Lanham, Maryland: Scarecrow Press. ISBN 978-0-8108-7450-3.
- Martirosyan, Levon M. (2013). "Արագած լեռնազանգվածի ռեկրեացիոն ռեսուրսները եվ դրանց գնահատումը (Recreational Resources and Mountain Mass Evaluation of Aragats)" (PDF). Scientific Proceedings (in Armenian) (2). Gyumri State Pedagogical Institute: 125–132. Archived from the original (PDF) on April 29, 2016.
