= Vahramashen Church =

Cultural heritage monument of Armenia

Vahramashen Church of Surp Astvatsatsin
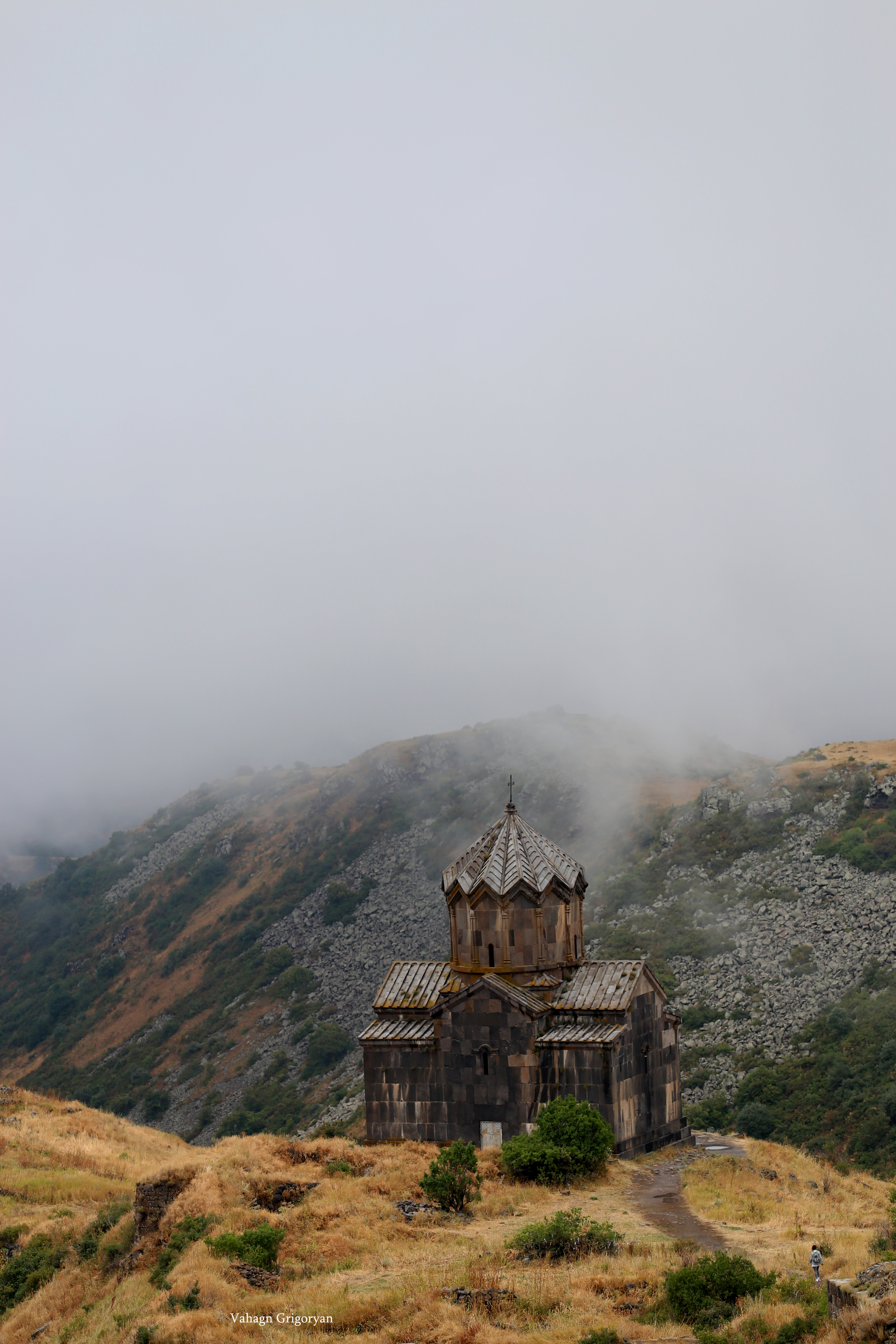
- General view of Vahramashen Church and the southern slope of Mount Aragats

- Location within Armenia Location within Aragatsotn

Religion
- Affiliation: Armenian Apostolic Church

Location
- Location: Southern slope of Mount Aragats, Aragatsotn Province, Armenia
- Coordinates: 40.387492°N 44.228625°E

Architecture
- Type: Cruciform central-plan
- Style: Armenian
- Completed: 1026

The Vahramashen Church (Armenian: Վահրամաշեն եկեղեցի), also commonly referred to as Vahramashen Surp Astvatsatsin or the Church of Amberd) was built for Prince Vahram Pahlavuni of the Pahlavuni family. An inscription on the inside lintel of the north portal to the church dates its completion to the year 1026. It sits along the slopes of Mount Aragats in the Aragatsotn province of Armenia, between the fortress of Amberd and near a wall along the promontory with the Arkashian River in the canyon below.

== Architecture ==
S. Astvatsatsin is a cruciform type church with four two-story chambers in the corners. A large circular twelve-faceted drum sits on top of the church, with pairs of thin decorative columns standing at the edge of each facet. A conical umbrella type dome rests above. The exterior of the church is simply decorated with edging around the portal and saddles of some small windows, layers of cornice work just above the thin columns on the drum and dome, and some cross relief designs carved into the façades.

== Gallery ==
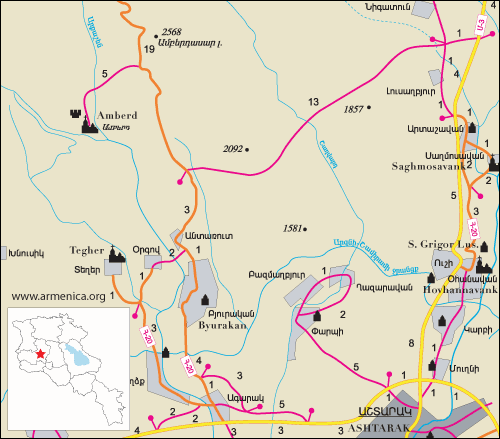
Location of Amberd fortress and Vahramashen

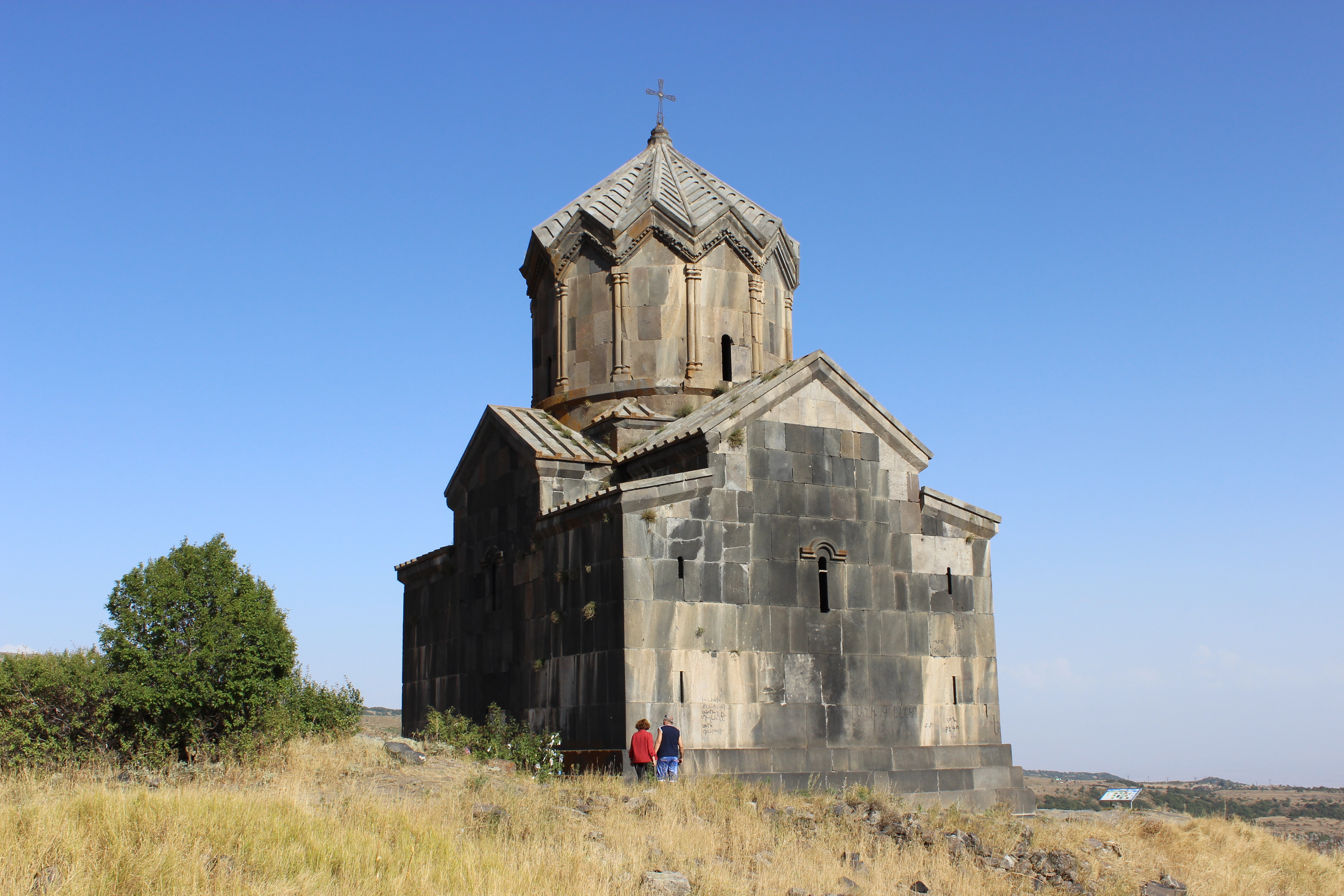
Closeup of church

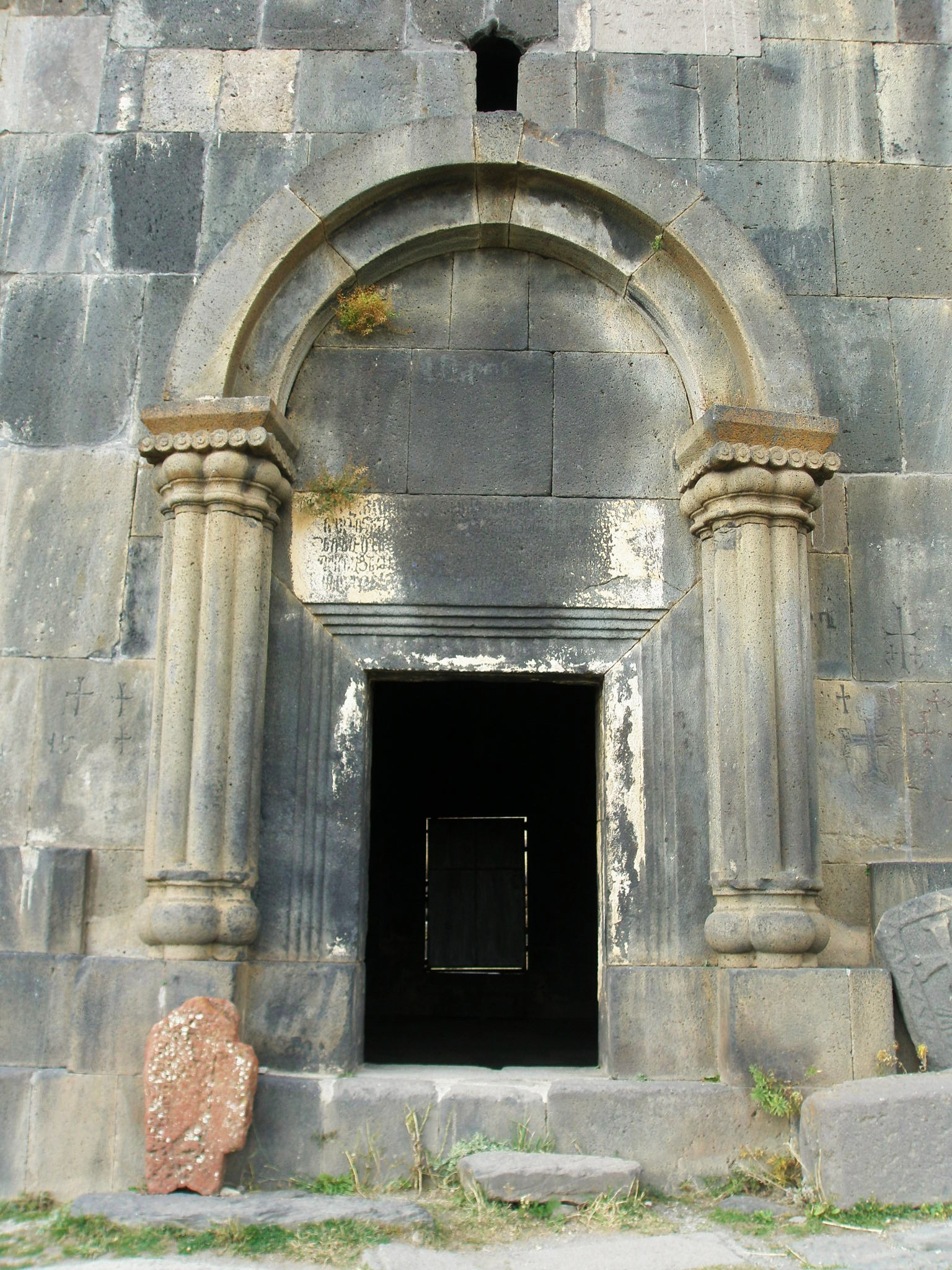
South portal (main entry)

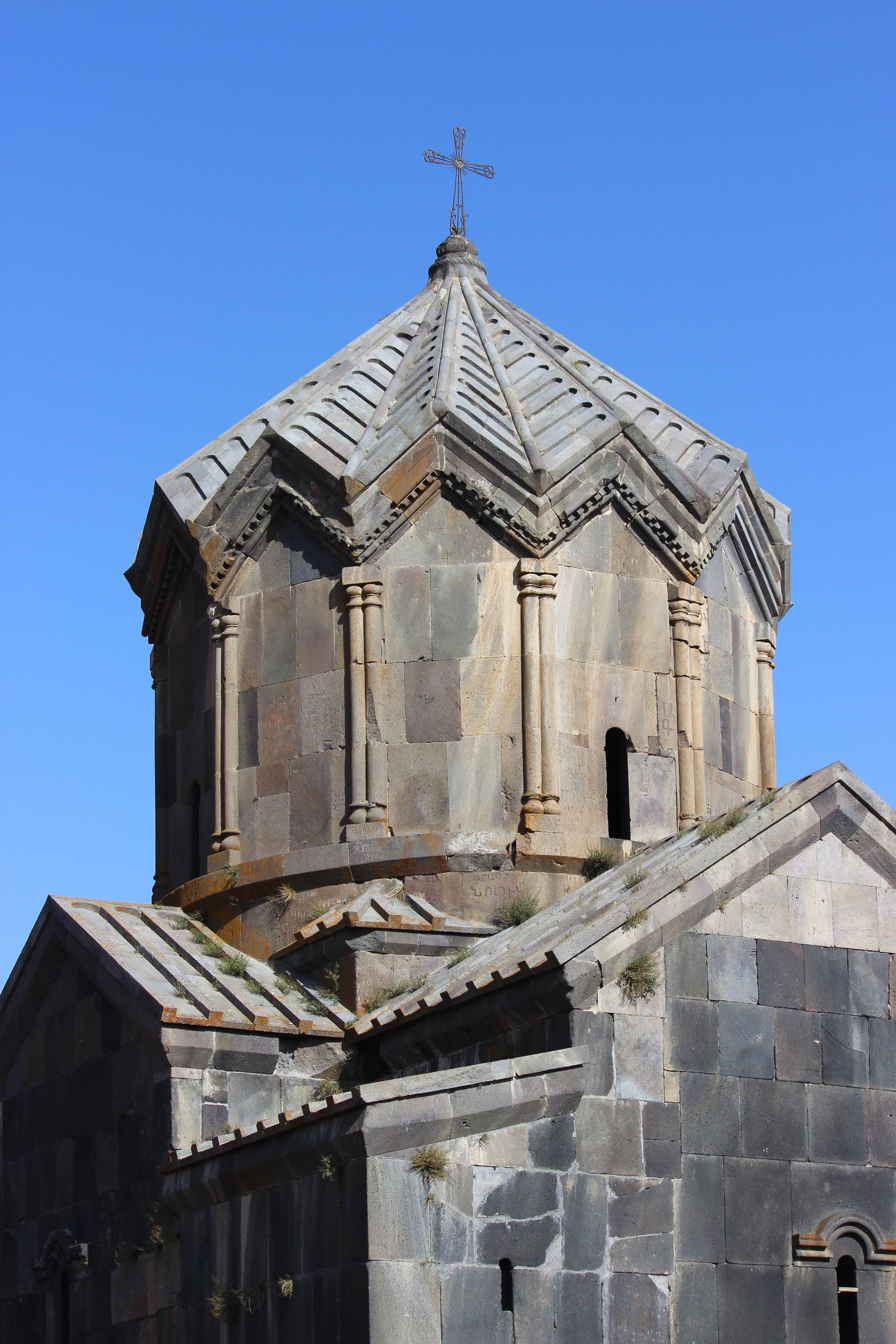
Closeup of cupola

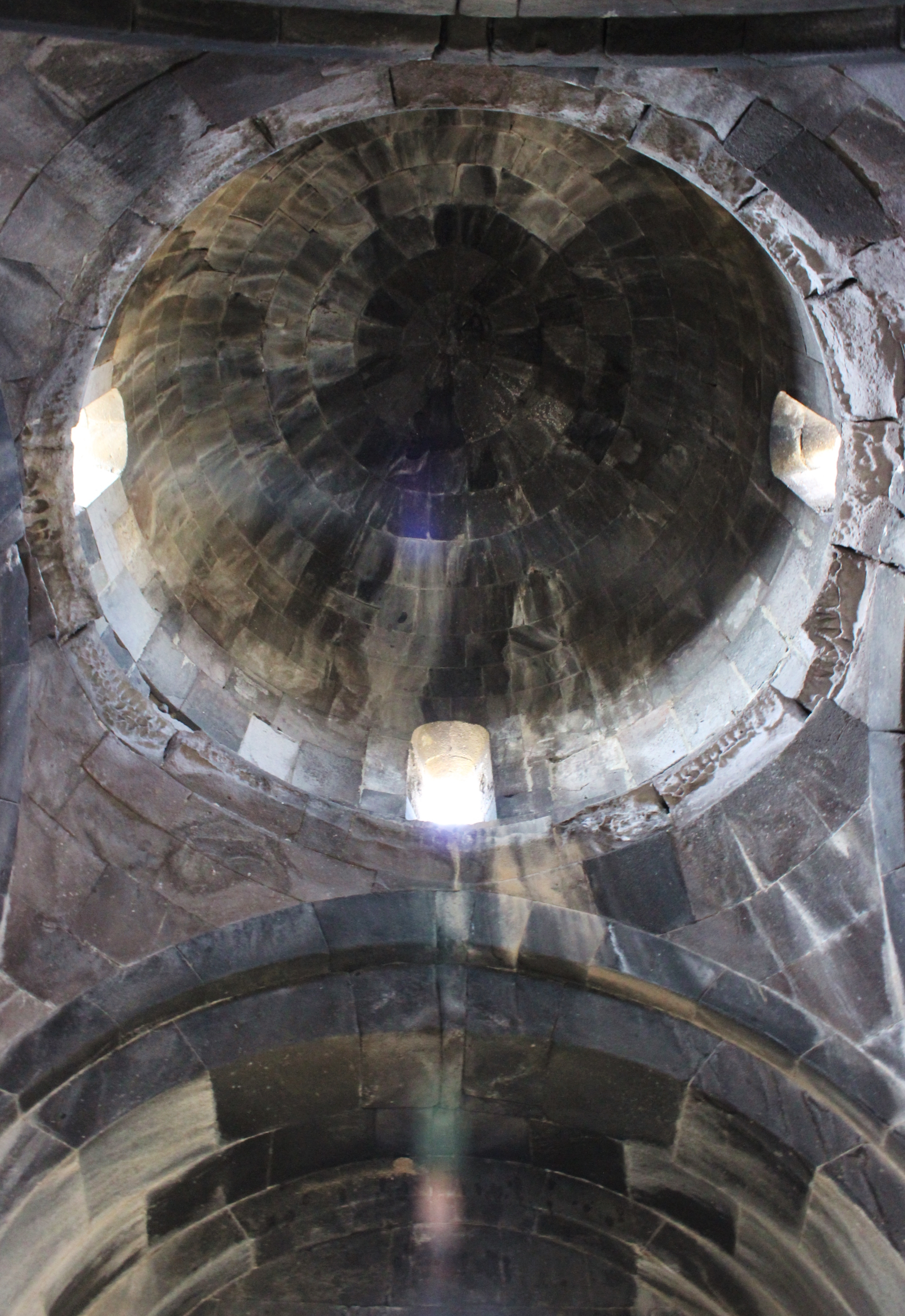
Interior view of the dome

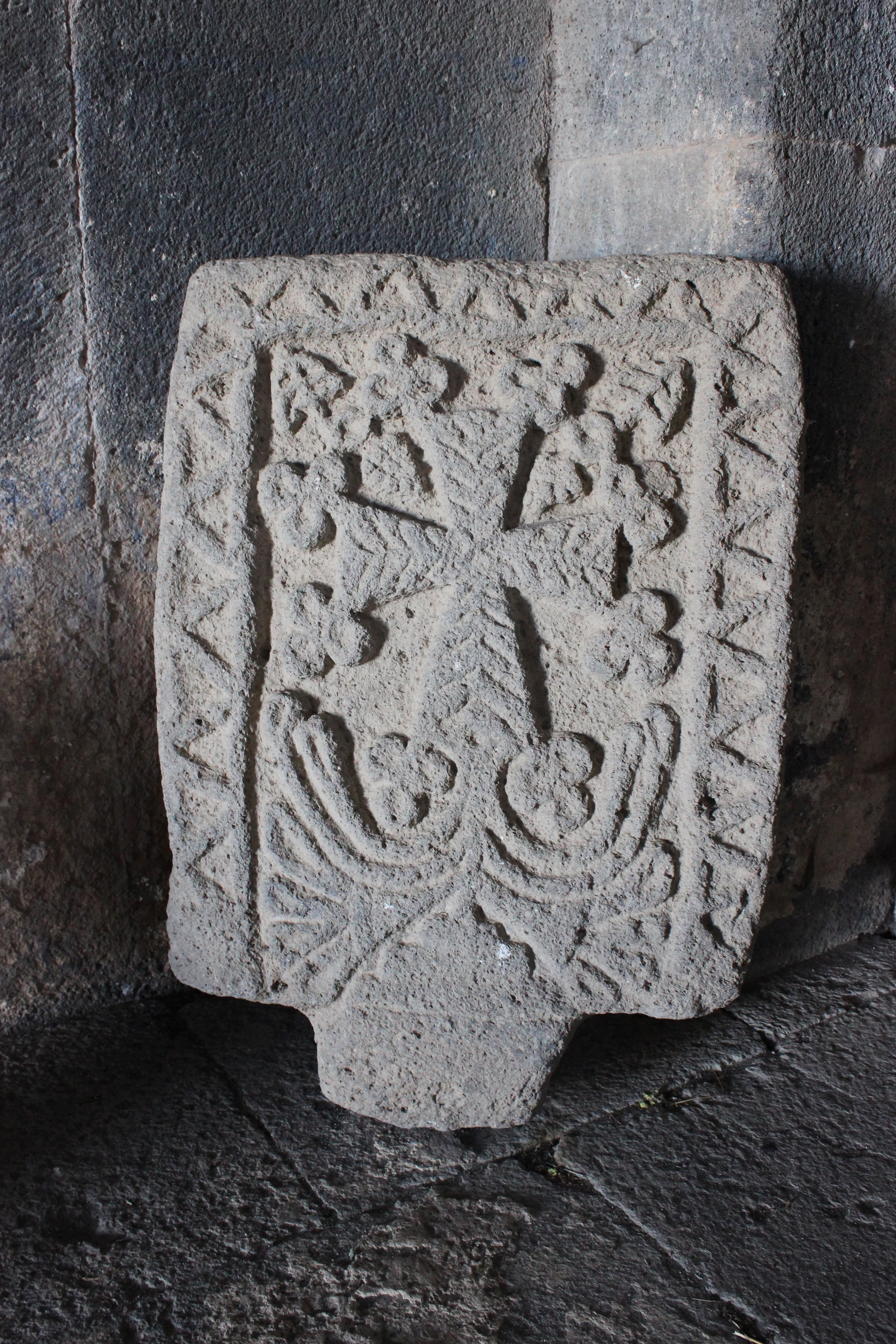
Khachkar

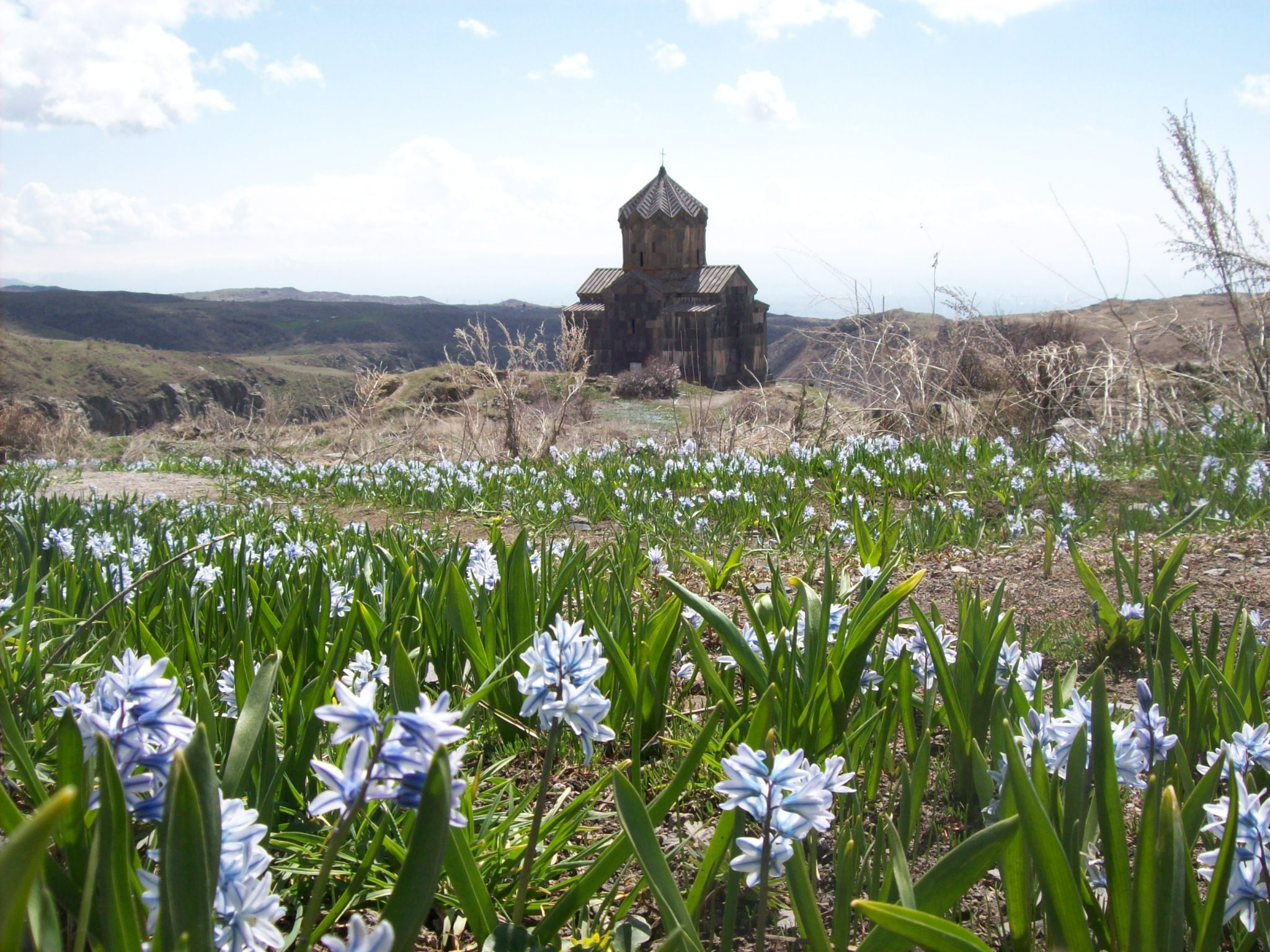
Vahramashen Surp Astvatsatsin during the spring

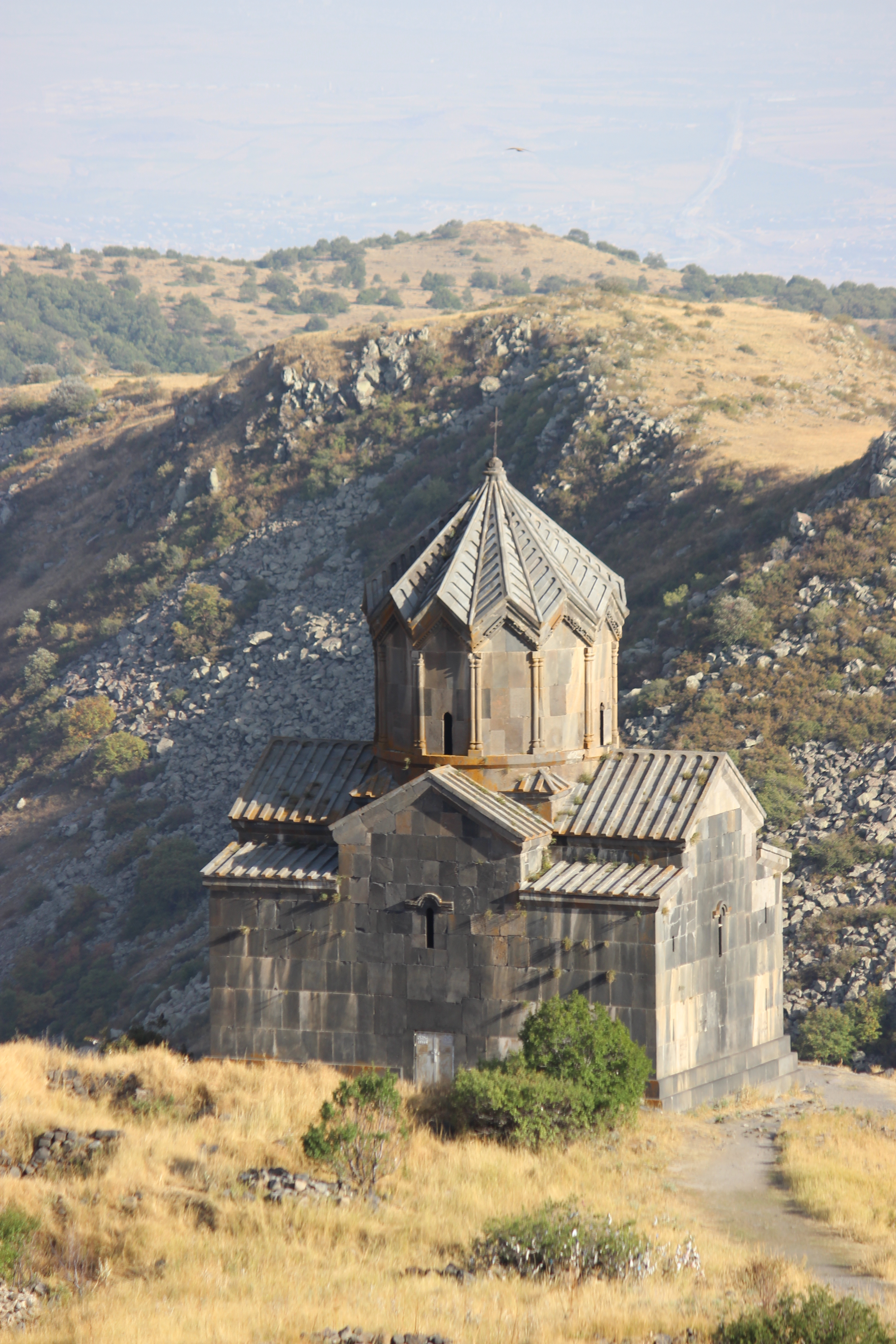

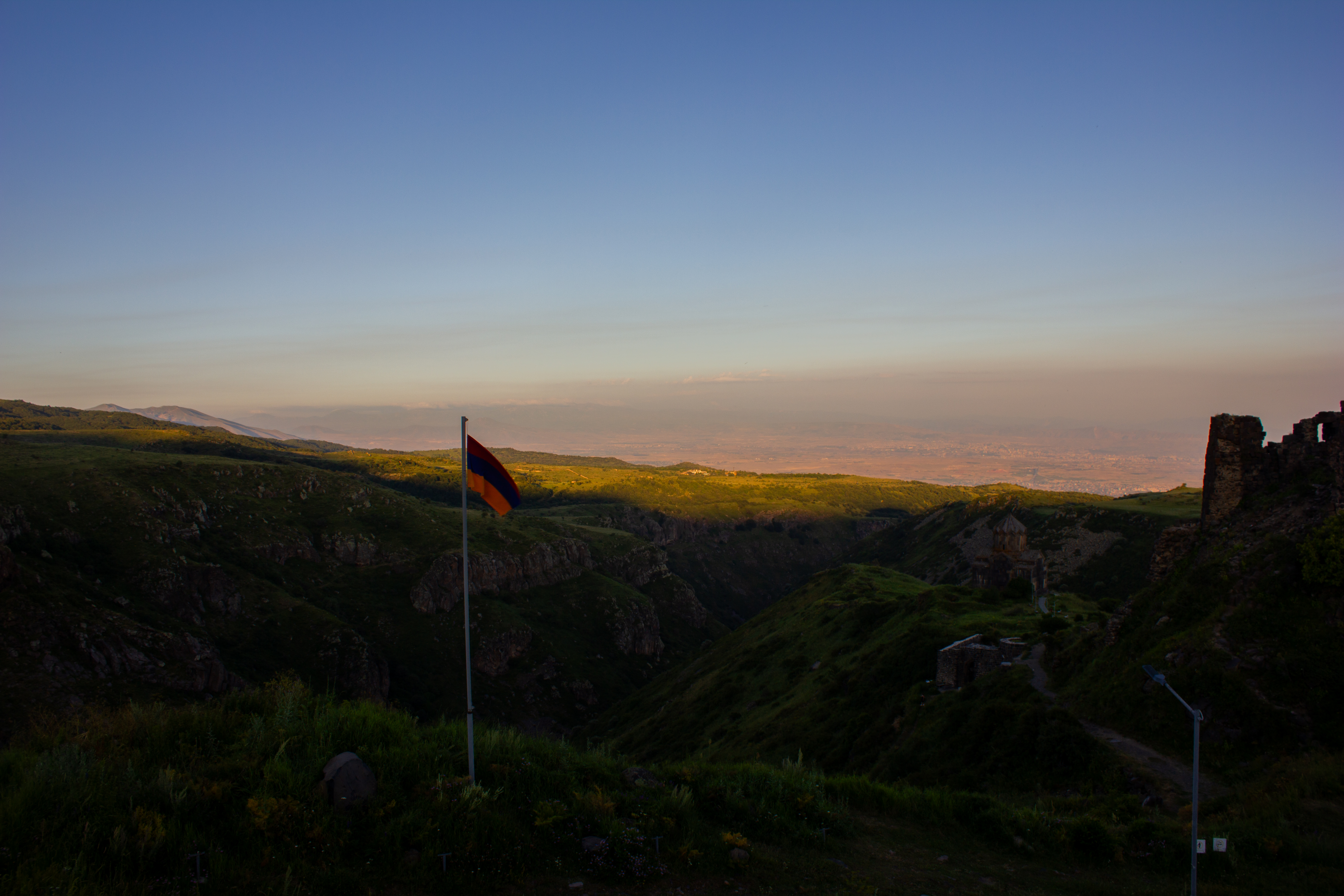

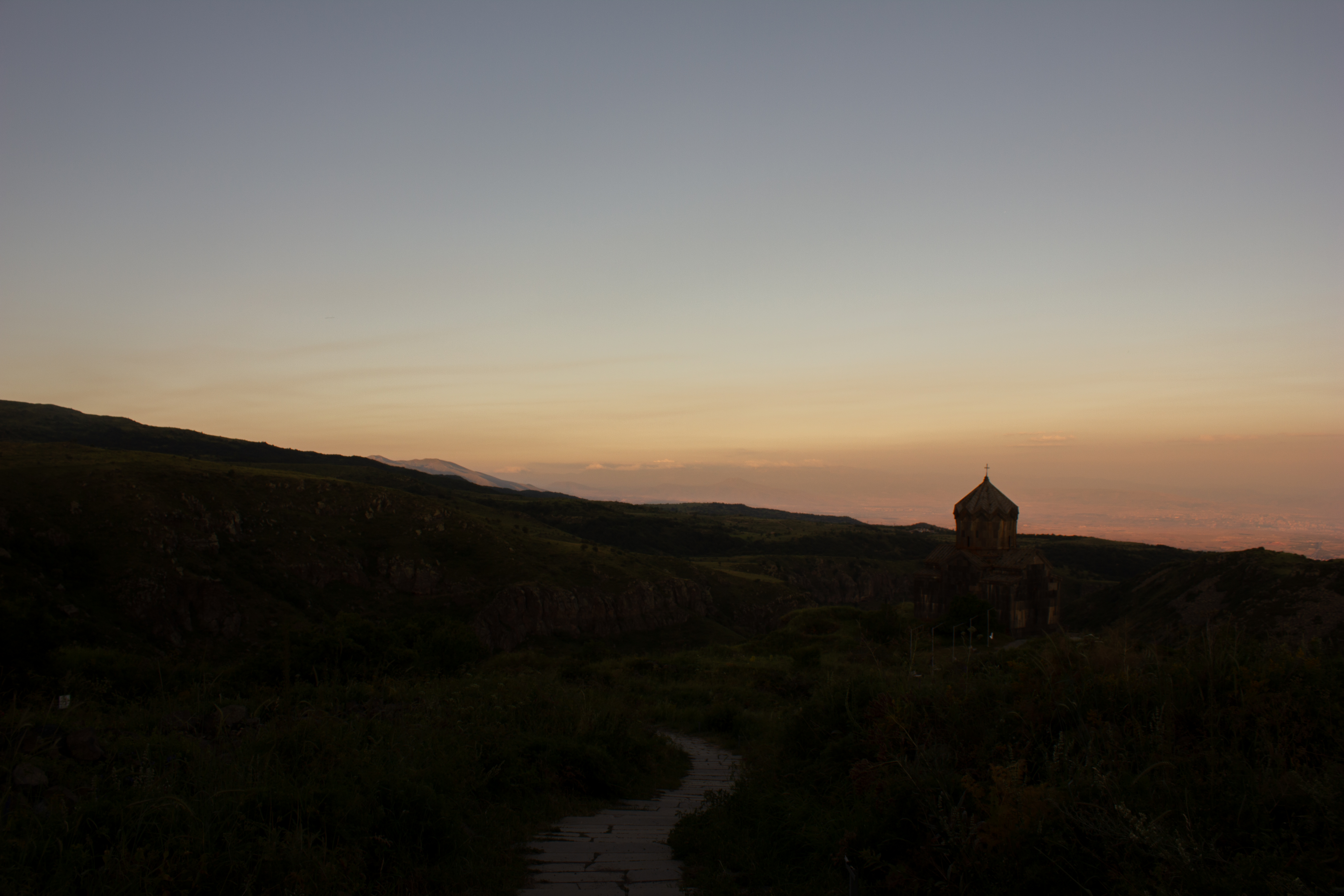

== See also ==
- Amberd
