= Lake Kari =

Lake in Armenia

Lake Kari Քարի լիճ
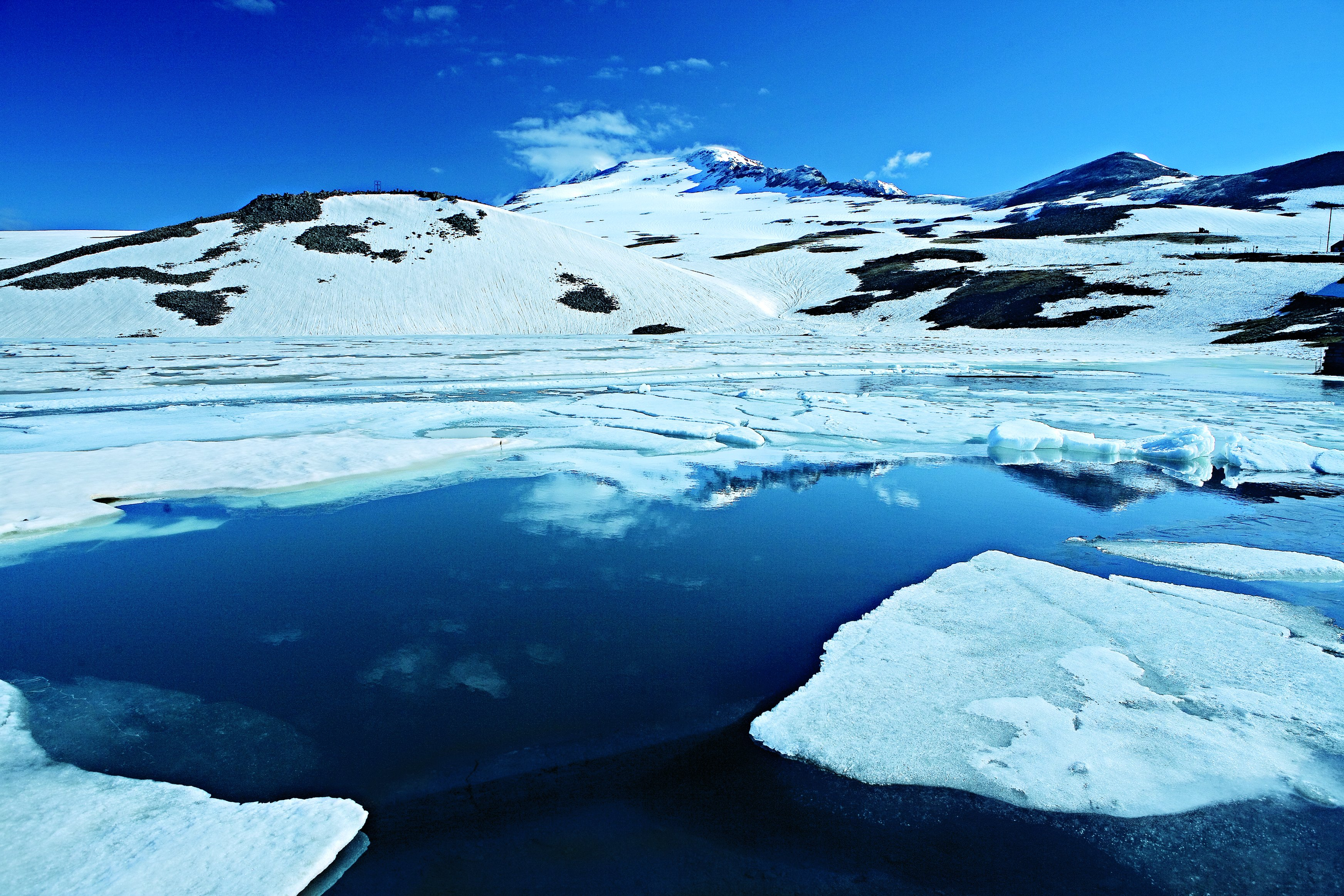

- Location within Armenia Location within Caucasus Mountains
- Interactive map of Lake Kari; Քարի լիճ
- Location: near Mount Aragats, Armenia
- Coordinates: 40°28′24.78″N 44°10′51.92″E
- Basin countries: Armenia
- Surface area: 0.12 km^{2} (0.046 sq mi)
- Water volume: 375,000 m^{3} (13,200,000 cu ft)
- Surface elevation: 3,185 m (10,449 ft)

Lake Kari (Armenian: Քարի լիճ, romanized: K’ari lich, lit. 'Rock/Mountain Lake') is a freshwater lake in Armenia located on the slopes of Mount Aragats. It is located 3,185 m above sea level and has a perimeter of 1,150 m. Its depth is up to 8 m, its volume is 375,000 m^{3}, and it has a surface area of 0.12 km^{2}. It formed in a u-shaped valley enclosed by moraines. The water of the lake is limpid and cold and comes mainly from precipitation. It is frozen for 8–9 months a year.

According to one theory, the lake is man-made and was used for irrigation purposes in the pre-Urartian period. The lake was previously the source of the Geghadzor River which flows into the plain of Shirak. In the 17th-century, Catholicos Pilippos I ordered the river source closed and connected the lake to the Amberd River, a tributary of the Kasagh. Later, this canal disappeared. There is a cosmic ray station next to the lake, founded in 1943 by physicists Abraham and Artem Alikhanyan. In 1963, the gegharkuni strain of the Sevan trout was artificially introduced to the lake. The fish did not multiply, but they grew at a faster rate than in Lake Sevan.

The lake can be reached from the south by the road leading from the village of Agarak; another road starting from the Armenian alphabet monument connects to the main road from the east. The roads are closed by snow during the winter, which can last into late May. The lake is used as a starting point for climbing the southern peak of Mount Aragats.

== Gallery ==
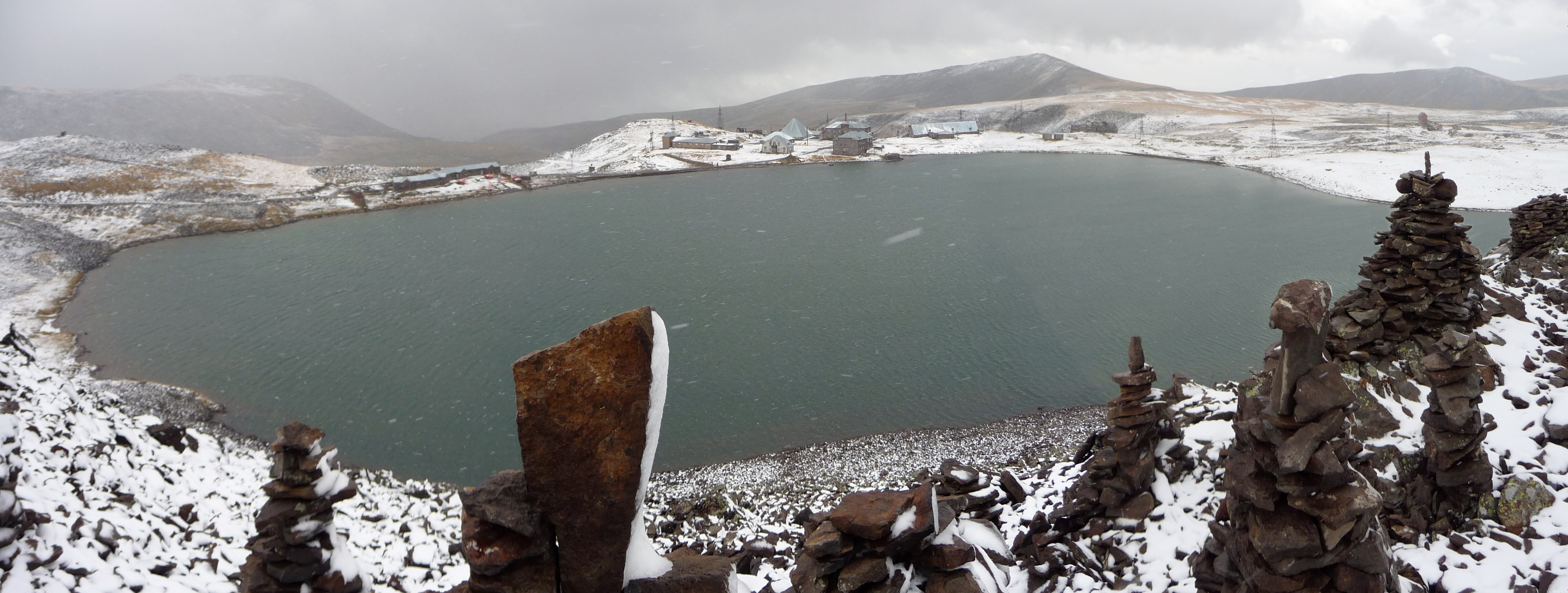

== See also ==
- Mount Aragats
- Rivers and lakes of Armenia
