= Aragats Cosmic Ray Research Station =

Scientific installation on Mount Aragats, Armenia

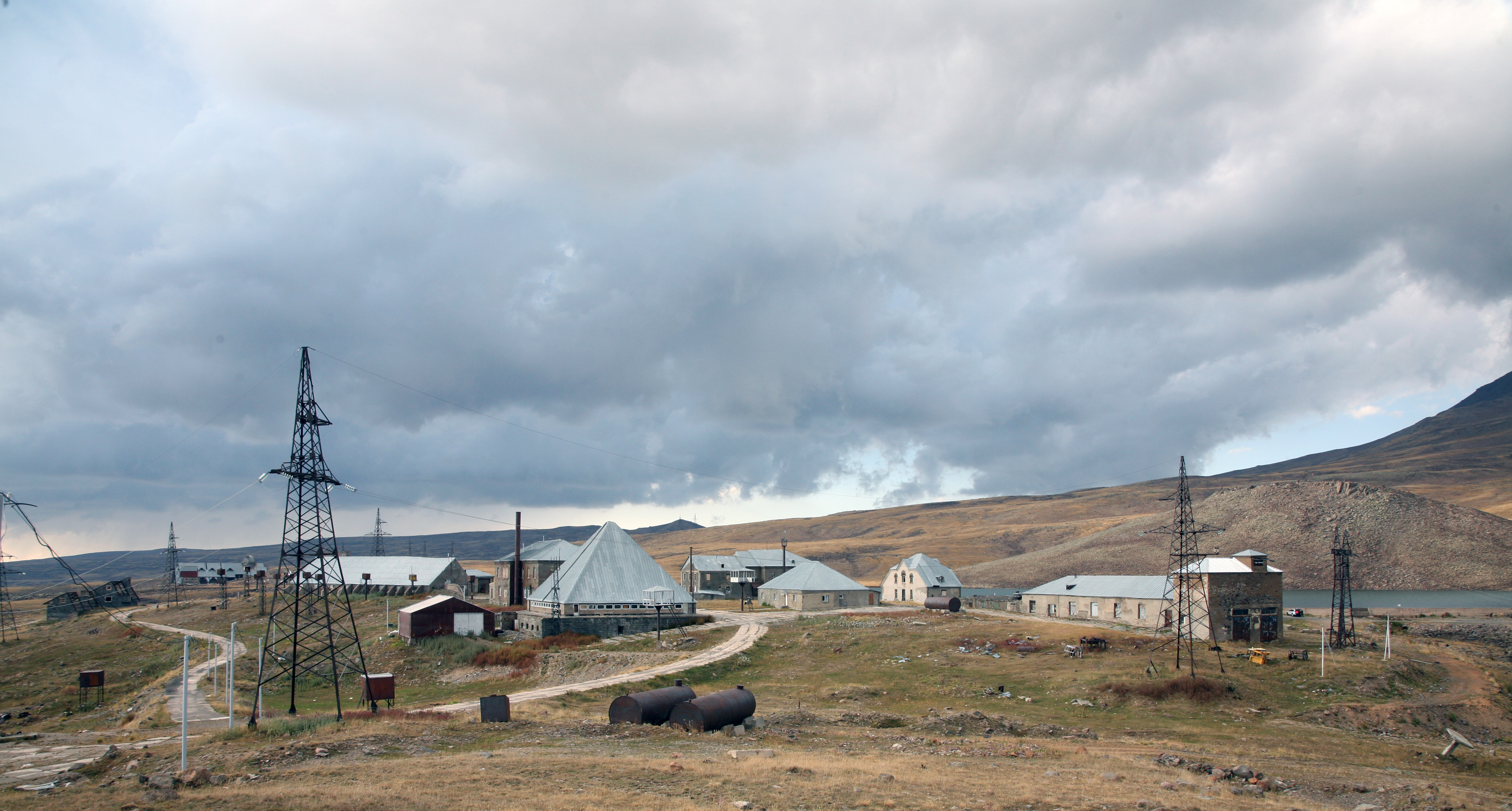
- View of the research station's buildings and the surrounding landscape
- Location: Mount Aragats, Armenia
- Coordinates: 40.4713°N 44.1819°E
- Altitude: 3,200 metres (10,500 ft)
- Established: 1943
- Location of Aragats Cosmic Ray Research Station
- Related media on Commons

The Aragats Cosmic Ray Research Station was founded in 1943 by Artem and Abraham Alikhanians (Abram Alikhanov), during World War II, to study cosmic ray and particle physics. It is located on Mount Aragats in Armenia, at an elevation of 3,200 meters, near Kari Lake.

== History ==
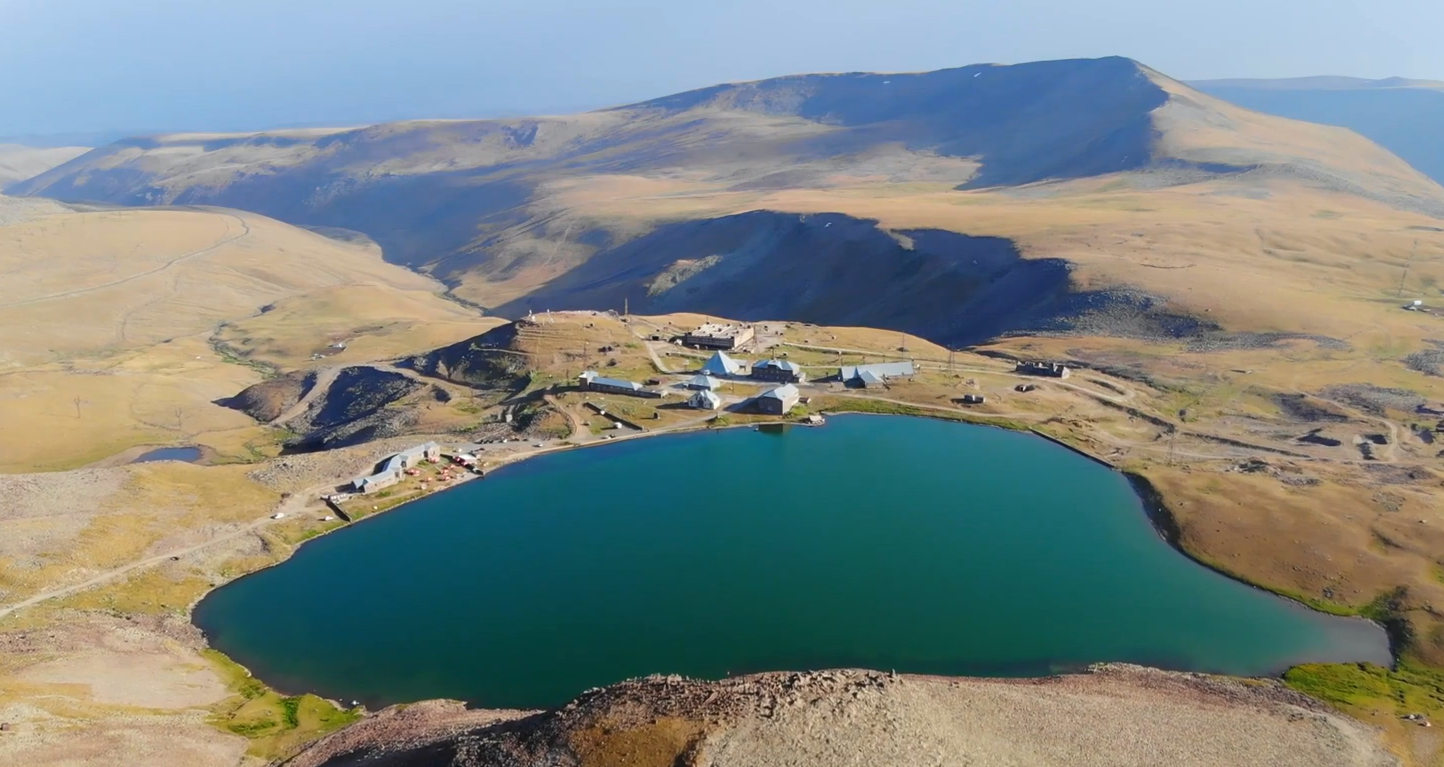
View of the research station from above, showing Kari Lake

Research on cosmic rays at Aragats started with a 1934 study by the Leningrad Physical-Technical Institute, focusing on how cosmic rays differ from East to West. Norair Kocharian from Yerevan State University later added to this research. These early findings led Artem and Abraham Alikhanians to set up a more detailed study in 1942. the station has been operational with minimal interruption since establishment.

Since it was set up, the Aragats station has made contributions to studying cosmic rays including the fields of High-Energy Particle Physics, Astrophysics, and Space Weather.

In its early stages, the station used mass spectrometry to study the properties of charged particles, contributed by the Alikhanyan brothers. This work, which took about 15 years, helped improve methods for analyzing masses and identifying cosmic ray protons. The idea of 'varitrons,' proposed during this time, aroused discussions in the science community about elementary particles, even though not all findings were confirmed. This discussion helped establish Aragats as a location for cosmic ray research

=== The period from 1958 to 1970 ===
From 1958 to 1970, progress was made in cosmic ray research through calorimetric methods. Naum Grigorov and his team, working with the Yerevan Physics Institute, installed an ionization calorimeter, leading to research into hadron-nuclei interactions. Following experiments like PION and MUON used advanced detectors and early computers for data gathering and analysis.

=== 1980s ===
In the 1980s, the ANI experiment was planned to analyze Extensive Air Showers (EASs) using large detectors to study a wide range of cosmic ray types and energies. However, the dissolution of the USSR posed challenges to its full execution. Despite such, the MAKET-ANI and GAMMA projects published in high-energy cosmic ray research

== Aragats Space Environmental Center (ASEC) ==
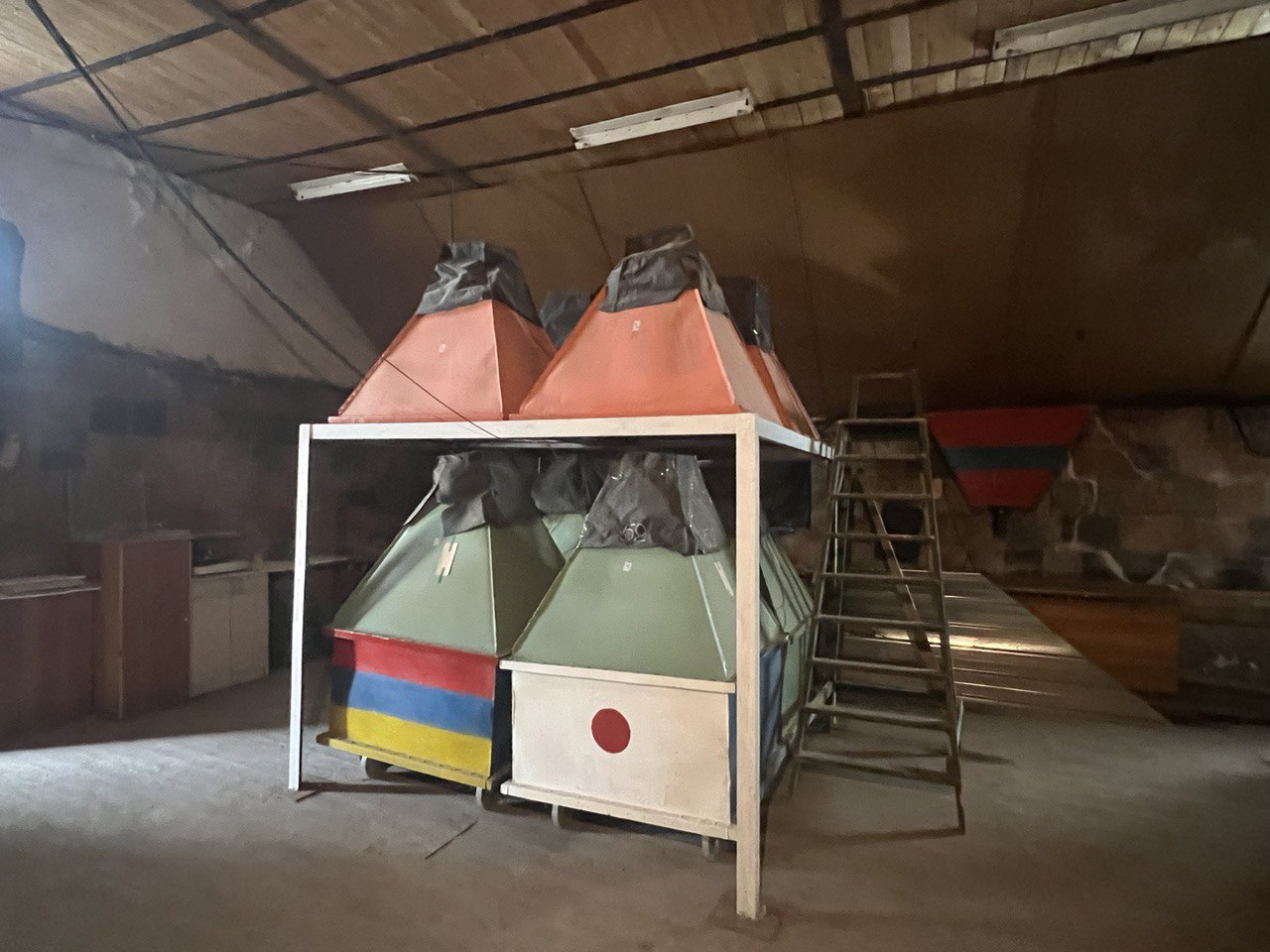
SEVAN (Space Environmental Viewing and Analysis Network) network located at Aragats Cosmic Ray Research Station

In 2000, the Aragats Space Environmental Center (ASEC) was established, aimed to enhance research in solar physics and space weather. ASEC employs neutron monitors and scintillation detectors to track cosmic ray fluxes and create early warning systems for solar energetic particle events. With the launch of the SEVAN detector network in 2007, the station improved its detection ability on particle acceleration and movement in the solar corona and interplanetary space.

The network's initial setups were in Croatia, Bulgaria, and India. Expansion continued with the installation of SEVAN detectors in Slovakia, Germany (Hamburg and Berlin), Czech Republic, and atop Zugspitze in 2023.

Recent developments 2008-2025 Since 2010, significantly enlarged facilities on Aragats continuously monitor fluxes of charged and neutral particles, electrical and geomagnetic fields, lightning location, meteorological parameters, and skies above the station. Later, similar monitoring centers were established in 2 sites on the slopes of Mt. Aragats and Yerevan (Chilingarian et al., 2024a), making Aragats a major center for the interdisciplinary research of cosmic rays and geophysics phenomena. Among the most significant discoveries of last years was the measurement of electron and gamma-ray energy spectra of thunderstorm ground enhancements (TGEs), the key evidence of developing relativistic runaway electron avalanches (RREA) in the thunderous atmosphere (Chilingarian et al., 2024b, Starr, 2024). The largest TGEs registered in Armenia, at Mt. Musala (Bulgaria), Mt. Lomnicky Stit (Slovakia), and Mt. Milesovka in the Czech Republic, and recent measurements at Zugspitze prove that TGE is a universal characteristic of thunderstorms worldwide (Kwan, 2024a), significantly influencing terrestrial climate and operation of the global electric circuit (GEC). The measured energy spectra allow us to gain insight into the thundercloud's charge structure and clarify the role of the lower positively charged region (LPCR) in developing the lightning initiation (Chilingarian et al., 2024c). Other discoveries made on Aragats include the registration of the atmospheric neutrons observed during thunderstorms, originating from the photonuclear reactions of the RREA gamma rays; the discovery of the Radon circulation effect; the uncovering of the muon stopping effect and abrupt enhancement of positron flux; the estimation of the largest electric voltage (potential difference) at mountain peaks; and the observation of transient luminous events (TLEs) in the lower atmosphere.¬¬¬ Interdisciplinary research at Aragats reveals the synergy of atmospheric and Galactic particle accelerators, enhancing our understanding of cosmic ray phenomena (Kwan, 2024b). A recent study (Chilingarian and Zazyan, 2024) reveals that atmospheric electron accelerators impact energy measurements of the highest energy cosmic rays. Consequently, examining the atmospheric conditions for each ultra-high-energy (UHE) event is essential to accurately identify true sources of PeV energy gamma rays, marking an exciting convergence of space and atmospheric sciences. Data from local and international networks are available online through free-access databases and Mendeley datasets (Chilingarian et al., 2024d).

References Chilingarian A., Karapetyan T., Sargsyan B., Y.Khanikyanc, and S.Chilingaryan (2024a) Measurements of Particle Fluxes, Electric Fields, and Lightning Occurrences at the Aragats Space-Environmental Center (ASEC), Pure and Applied Geophysics 181, 1963. https://doi.org/10.1007/s00024-024-03481-5 Chilingarian A., Sargsyan B., Karapetyan T. et al.(2024b), Extreme thunderstorm ground enhancements registered on Aragats in 2023, Physical Review D 110, 063043. Chilingarian A., B. Sargsyan, Zazyan M. (2024c) An Enormous Increase in Atmospheric Positron Flux during a Summer Thunderstorm on Mount Aragats, Radiation Physics and Chemistry, 222, 111819. doi.org/10.1016/j.radphyschem.2024.111819

A. Chilingarian, M. Zazyan, Overestimation of Astrophysical Gamma-Ray Energies During Thunderstorms: Synergy of Galactic and Atmospheric Accelerators, Astrophysical Journal Letters 975 (issue 2), L39. DOI: 10.3847/2041-8213/ad85e1 Jacklin Kwan (2024a)Physics World, https://physicsworld.com/a/mountaintop-observations-of-gamma-ray-glow-could-shed-light-on-origins-of-lightning/

Michelle Star (2024) Overlooked Weather Phenomenon Produces Gamma Rays in Our Atmosphere, Science alert, https://www.sciencealert.com/overlooked-weather-phenomenon-produces-gamma-rays-in-our-atmosphere

Jacklin Kwan (2024b), Could thunderstorms be exaggerating the strength of mysterious gamma rays from outer space? Science, December 20, 2024. Chilingarian A., Karapetyan T., B. Sargsyan B., et al. (2024d) Dataset on extreme thunderstorm ground enhancements registered on Aragats in 2023, Data in Brief, 54, 110554. doi.org/10.1016/j.dib.2024.110554
