= Alevtina Shmeleva =

Russian nuclear physicist (1928–2022)

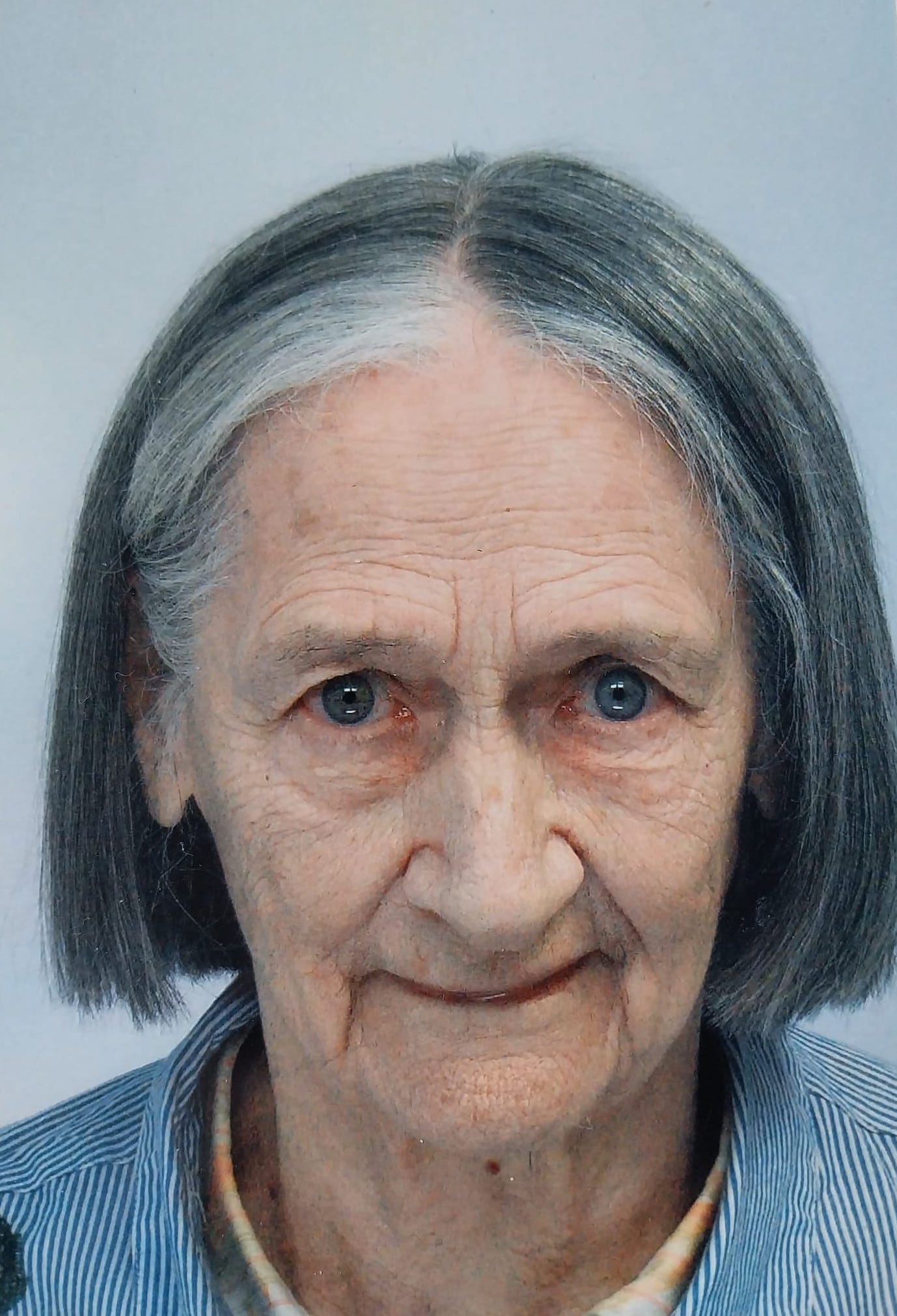
- Born: 11 June 1928; Kyiv, Ukrainian SSR, USSR
- Died: 25 April 2022 (aged 93); Echenevex, Ain, France
- Citizenship: USSR, Russia, Switzerland
- Education: Moscow Institute of Foreign Languages for two years; MEPhI (Moscow Engineering Physics Institute) (diploma, 1953)
- Known for: Transition Radiation Detectors
- Spouse: Boris Dolgoshein
- Children: Elena
- Scientific career
- Fields: Physics
- Workplaces: FIAN, CERN

Alevtina Pavlovna Shmeleva (Russian: Алевтина Павловна Шмелева; 11 June 1928 – 25 April 2022) was a Russian nuclear physicist.

She studied at the Moscow Institute of Foreign Languages for two years, before she found her dedication within physics and particle detectors at the Moscow Engineering and Physics University, where she graduated in 1954. Shmeleva joined the Elementary Particles Laboratory in the P. N. Lebedev Physical Institute (LPI) under the guidance of academician Artyom Alikhanian. He was the scientific adviser of PhD thesis of Aleftina Shmeleva. The first job after graduating from the institute in 1954 was participation in expeditions to the Mount Aragats cosmic ray research station and later to the Nor Amberd station in Armenia. Here, studies of cosmic rays were carried out at the heights of mountains with the help of magnetic spectrometers. Shmeleva led the work on the creation of a spark calorimeter for these experiments. These studies measured intensity and composition of the nuclear component of cosmic rays at altitude 2000 meters above sea level in the energy range 100-300 GeV. Later she started to work with Transition Radiation Detector prototypes, which were rather new at this time and which required pioneering skills.

Between 1976 and 1988, Shmeleva participated in the development of a full absorption spectrometer on liquid xenon with a volume of 40 liters. The created spectrometer had the best energy resolution for that time of 3.5% $/ \sqrt{E(GeV)}$ and coordinate resolution of 5.6 mm$/ \sqrt{E(GeV)}$.

From 1980 to 1988 she participated in the R808 experiment to study the production of prompt photons at the world's first proton collider ISR at CERN. For this experiment, employees of the Lebedev Physical Institute, INR, MEPhI and INP SB RAS developed hodoscope panels for shower counters based on scintillator NaI(Tl) crystals with a total weight of about one ton.

In 1977 Shmeleva and her husband Boris Dolgoshein from MEPhI participated in the International Symposium on Transition Radiation in Erevan, Armenia, where they met William J. Willis, whom they managed to convince about the concept of cluster-counting Transition Radiation Detectors (TRDs), and he invited the LPI-MEPhI group to CERN to realise the idea. Since then, Shmeleva collaborated with the particle physics community at CERN. From 1978 to 1988, she coordinated the work of the Lebedev group, building prototype TRDs, testing them at the SPS and delivering the TRD of the HELIOS experiment at the SPS (NA34/1 and NA34/2). As an expert in transition radiation detectors, Shmeleva joined the challenging ATLAS TRT project at Large Hadron Collider, where she and the Lebedev group started in the very early days of RD6, the preparations of the ATLAS TRT. Shmeleva and her team, since then, were pillars of the TRT collaboration.

Shmeleva was sensitive to the medical outreach of the fundamental science research, in particular with Vadim Kantzerov (MEPhI) she developed medical gamma locator.

Shmeleva had strong linguistic background and physics knowledge. She communicated well with colleagues. She brought people together and ensured that problems were solved.
