= House Museum of Minas Avetisyan =

Minas Avetisyan Museum
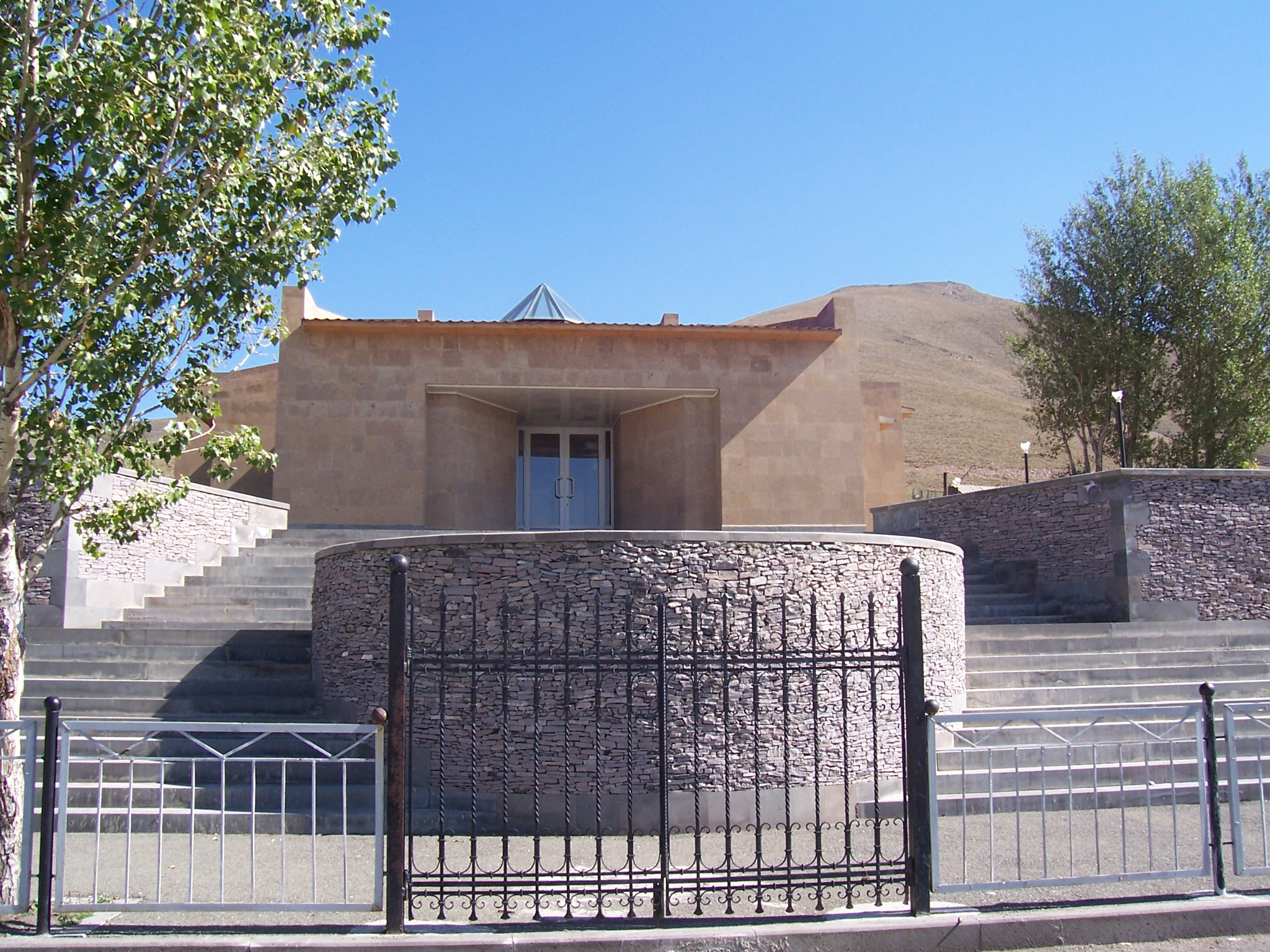
- Location: Jajur, Armenia
- Coordinates: 40°51′21″N 43°57′18″E
- Type: Museum

The House museum of painter Minas Avetisyan was opened on July 21, 1982, in Jajur, Armenia, the village where he was born. In 1988 it was destroyed because of 1988 Armenian earthquake and reopened in 2005.

Currently, more than 30 original and unique pieces on canvas are exhibited in the museum, making the museum the biggest exhibition of Minas Avetisyan’s works. The Birth of Toros Roslin mural was moved to the museum in 2010.
