= Ani Aprahamian =

Lebanese-born Armenian-American nuclear physicist

- Born: August 15, 1958 (age 67); Lebanon
- Education: Clark University (PhD, 1986); Lawrence Livermore National Laboratory
- Scientific career
- Fields: Nuclear physics, astrophysics
- Institutions: University of Notre Dame
- Website: physics.nd.edu/people/faculty/ani-aprahamian/

Ani Aprahamian (born August 15, 1958) is a Lebanese-born Armenian-American nuclear physicist. She has taught at the University of Notre Dame since 1989. She is currently Freimann Professor of Physics at Notre Dame. She has been director of the Alikhanyan National Science Laboratory (Yerevan Physics Institute) in Armenia since April 2018, the first woman to hold the position.

== Background ==
Aprahamian was born on August 15, 1958 in Lebanon to Armenian parents. All of her grandparents were survivors of the Armenian genocide, while her parents were born in refugee camps in Beirut. Her family moved to the United States when she was 11 and settled in Massachusetts. Her father worked as a tailor, while her mother a seamstress. She was interested in science as a young kid, but initially wanted to become an ambassador, but was persuaded by a high school guidance counselor in Worcester, Massachusetts to get an education in science. She speaks Armenian.

She obtained her BA from Clark University in 1980 and PhD in nuclear chemistry in 1986. She was a postdoctoral fellow at Lawrence Livermore National Laboratory.

== Career ==
An experimental nuclear physicist, Aprahamian's research focuses on the "evolution of nuclear structure and the impact of various structure effects on stellar and explosive astrophysical processes" and the "origins of the heavy elements in the universe and the structure of neutron rich nuclei far from stability." She maintains "strong interests in the applications of nuclear science to energy and medicine."

As of late 2019, she has given over 200 talks and various conferences and has over 200 publications in journals and book chapters.

=== University of Notre Dame ===
Aprahamian joined the faculty of the Physics Department and the Nuclear Science Laboratory at the University of Notre Dame in 1989. Aprahamian was the only female nuclear physicist at Notre Dame for 27 years.

She was the director of Notre Dame's Nuclear Science Laboratory from 2001 to 2006 and chair of Notre Dame's Physics Department in 2003–2006. As of 2014, she had mentored some 10 postdoctoral fellows and 17 graduate students. She is currently the Frank M. Freimann Professor of Physics.

At the lab, Aprahamian led her team of 20 physicists' research on the overlap between nuclear physics and astrophysics using two particle accelerators.

=== Elsewhere ===
Aprahamian has served on U.S. and international committees on nuclear science. Aprahamian is a fellow of the American Physical Society (APS) since 1999 and the American Association for the Advancement of Science (AAAS) since 2008. Between 2006 and 2008 she was the program director for nuclear physics and particle & nuclear astrophysics at the National Science Foundation in Washington. In 2014 she served as a member of the Nuclear Science Advisory Committee of the United States Department of Energy. In the same year she served as chair of the APS Division of Nuclear Physics.

In 2016–17 she served as co-chair U.S. Electron–ion collider Facility Study.

She was a member of the Joint Institute for Nuclear Astrophysics executive committee, the American Chemical Society's Division of Nuclear Chemistry and Technology. She has also served as chair of the scientific council at GANIL, the French national nuclear physics research center. She was on the advisory board of Physics Today, the magazine of the American Institute of Physics.

=== Armenia ===
Aprahamian "holds deep feelings for Armenia." She was elected a foreign member of the National Academy of Sciences of Armenia in 2008. In November 2017 she met Armenian president Serzh Sargsyan. She was appointed director of the Alikhanyan National Science Laboratory (Yerevan Physics Institute, YerPhI) in April 2018. She became the first woman and the first diaspora Armenian to hold the position. In September 2018 she declared that a cyclotron will be put into operation for medical use. It was put into operation in July 2019 and is used primarily for positron-emission tomography (PET) scans in cancer detection. Aprahamian stated: "This is a game changer for Armenia." In a 2019 interview she stated that Armenia needs a "major reorganization" in science and that the country's "biggest challenges are in creating the opportunities and rewards that enable young scientists to stay in Armenia and to thrive here instead of traveling abroad."

In April 2020 Aprahamian and her team at the Alikhanyan Laboratory developed an ozone generator which can sterilize areas of up to 140 cubic meters every hour to help fight COVID-19.

== Selected publications ==
Aprahamian's most cited articles according to Google Scholar are:

- Schatz, Hendrick, Ani Aprahamian, Joachim Görres, Michael Wiescher, Thomas Rauscher, J. F. Rembges, F-K. Thielemann et al. "rp-Process nucleosynthesis at extreme temperature and density conditions." Physics Reports 294, no. 4 (1998): 167–263.
- Schatz, Hendrik, A. Aprahamian, V. Barnard, L. Bildsten, A. Cumming, M. Ouellette, T. Rauscher, F-K. Thielemann, and M. Wiescher. "End point of the rp process on accreting neutron stars." Physical Review Letters 86, no. 16 (2001): 3471.
- Mumpower, Matthew R., Rebecca Surman, G. C. McLaughlin, and A. Aprahamian. "The impact of individual nuclear properties on r-process nucleosynthesis." Progress in Particle and Nuclear Physics 86 (2016): 86-126.
- Hosmer, P. T., H. Schatz, A. Aprahamian, O. Arndt, R. R. C. Clement, A. Estrade, K-L. Kratz et al. "Half-Life of the Doubly Magic r-Process Nucleus N 78 i." Physical Review Letters 94, no. 11 (2005): 112501.
