= Arto Tchakmaktchian =

Canadian-Armenian sculptor and painter (1933–2019)

Arto Tchakmakchian
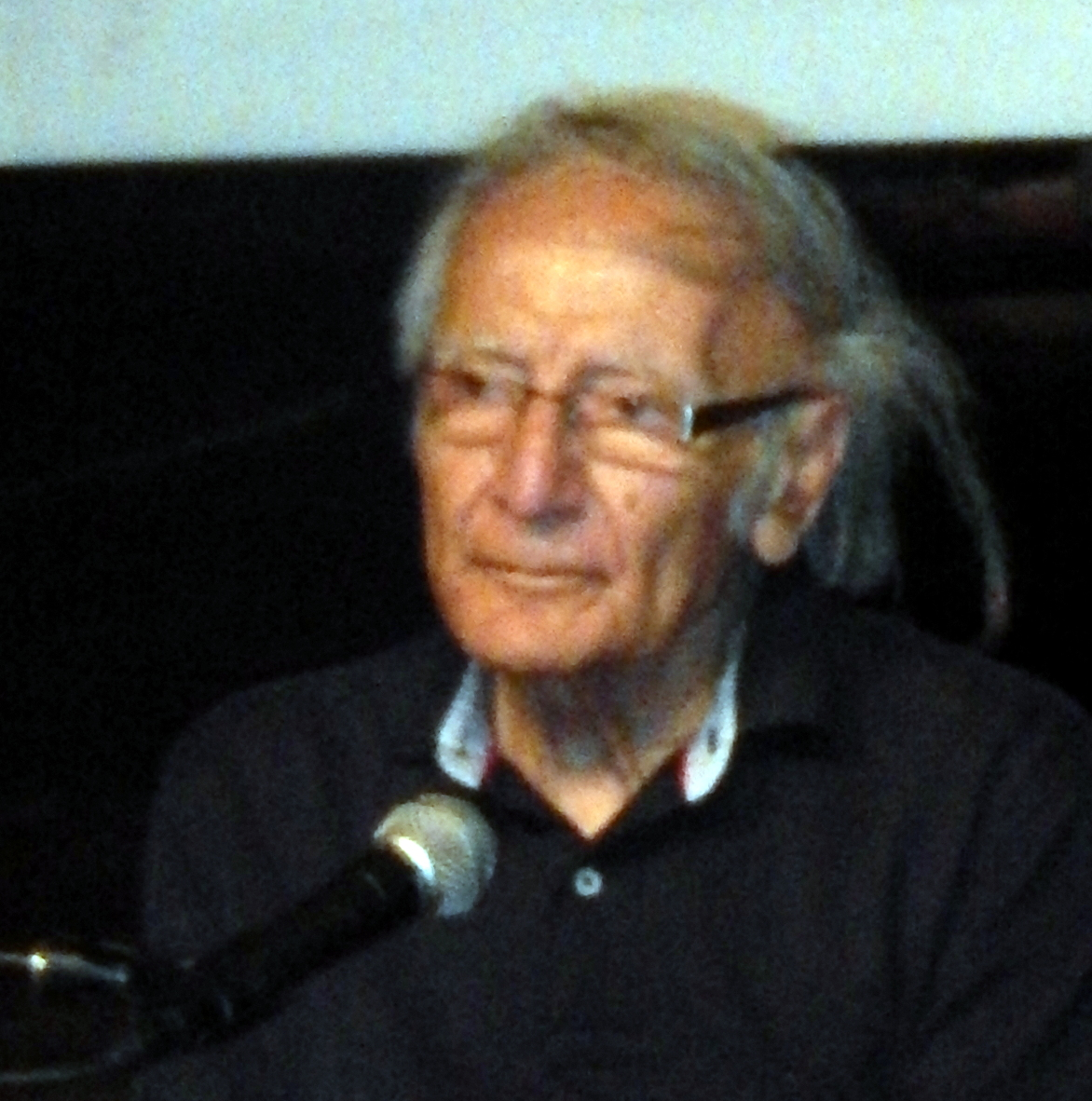
- Arto Tchakmaktchian in 2014
- Born: June 26, 1933; Cairo, Egypt
- Died: October 1, 2019 (aged 86)
- Occupations: Sculptor, painter

Arto Tchakmakchian RCA (Armenian: Արտո Չաքմաքչյան, (26 June 1933 – 1 October 2019) was a Canadian-Armenian sculptor and painter, a member of the Royal Canadian Academy of Arts. He was awarded by the Armenian Order of Honor in 2015.

== Biography ==
Arto (Harutyun) Tchakmakchian's father was a bookshop owner and a friend of Vahan Malezian. Arto was born in Cairo, Egypt in 1933 and studied at Nubarian National College in Heliopolis, then in 1946 his family repatriated to Yerevan. He began his professional studies at the age of 15 at the Art School of Panos Terlemezian. In 1962 he won first prize at the International Contemporary Ceramics Exhibition in Prague for his sculpture Reclining Figure". Won first prize for his composition "Monument to the Victims of Hiroshima in a competition organized by Moscow Peace Committee. The work was given by the USSR to the City of Hiroshima in 1964. In 1969 he was recipient of the Armenian Youth Union golden medal for his works Mother and Arno Babajanyan which were purchased by the State Tretiakov Gallery in Moscow. The same year Tchakmakchian appeared in Mikhail Vartanov's suppressed film The Color of Armenian Land along with Sergei Parajanov (imprisoned in 1973) and Minas Avetisyan (assassinated in 1975). Since 1964 academic Artem Alikhanian became one of the main supporters of Tchakmaktchian's art. In 1972 Joseph Brodsky while in Yerevan visited his studio. In 1984 Tchakmaktchian won First Prize in the Wilfrid Pelletier Competition in Montreal for his bust of the competition's namesake. The work is on permanent display in the entrance hall of Place des Arts in Montreal. His works have also been exhibited at notable museums internationally, notably in the Louvre Museum. A notable exhibition was held at UNESCO Headquarters in Paris in 2010.

== Awards ==
Arto Tchakmakchian's awards and acknowledgements included:

- 2004 "Order of Movses Khorenatsi", Armenia
- 2009 "Letter of Recognition" by the Minister of Culture, Communications and Feminine Condition of Quebec Government
- 2009 Medal of "Naregatsi" by the University of California in Los Angeles
- 2015 Order of Honor, Armenia

== Gallery ==
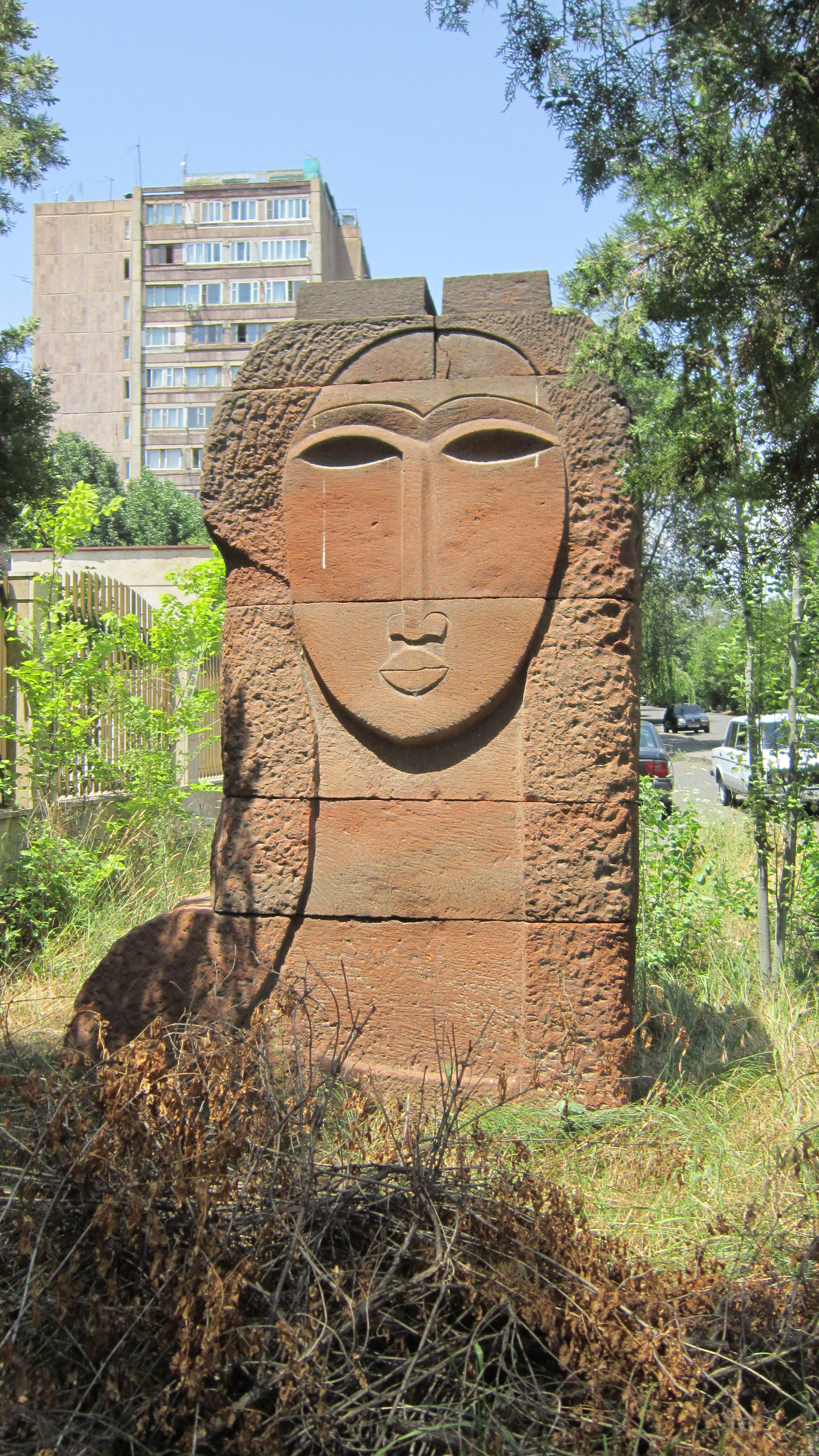
Armenian sphinx (Arus), Yerevan, 1963
