= Alikhanian–Alikhanov spectrometer =

The Alikhanian–Alikhanov spectrometer was a large solenoid physical instrument constructed by brothers Abraham Alikhanov and Artem Alikhanian at the Aragats scientific station in Armenia. The spectrometer was unique in the world.

It had the highest amount of magnetic field (1,0x0,3x0,15 cubic meters) with the intensity up to 20 kGauss and was packed with four and five-layer proportional thin-walled counters of 4.6 mm diameter and 30–35 cm length, through which the coordinates of the trajectories of cosmic rays determined with an accuracy of about 1 mm. Spectrometer, that had a high resolution (maximum measurable pulse in the field of 20 kGauss was 150 GeV/c) was used to determine the momentum and mass of cosmic particles. Abraham Alikhanov and Artem Alikhanian believed that the spectrum of elementary particles are richer and more varied than it had been thought at that time. (By 1951 the only known hadrons were the proton, neutron and pion, and the only known leptons were electron, muon and neutrino).

Experiments with spectrometer lead to the discovery of protons in cosmic rays (Alikhanian et al., 1945) and narrow air showers (Alikhanian, Asatiani, 1945). Using the Alikhanyan-Alikhanov magnetic spectrometer N. Kocharian obtained the energy spectra of muons and protons with energies up to several GeV (1952). However, only some of the many peaks in mass distributions measured at Aragats were later verified to be "real" particles and became known as π- and K-mesons.

The Alikhanian-Alikhanov mass spectrometer became the prototype for hodoscopic devices that have played a major role in nuclear physics research. The memorial Alikhanian-Alikhanov magnet spectrometer is situated on Mt. Aragats, Armenia.
