= Artem Alikhanian =

Soviet physicist (1908-1978)

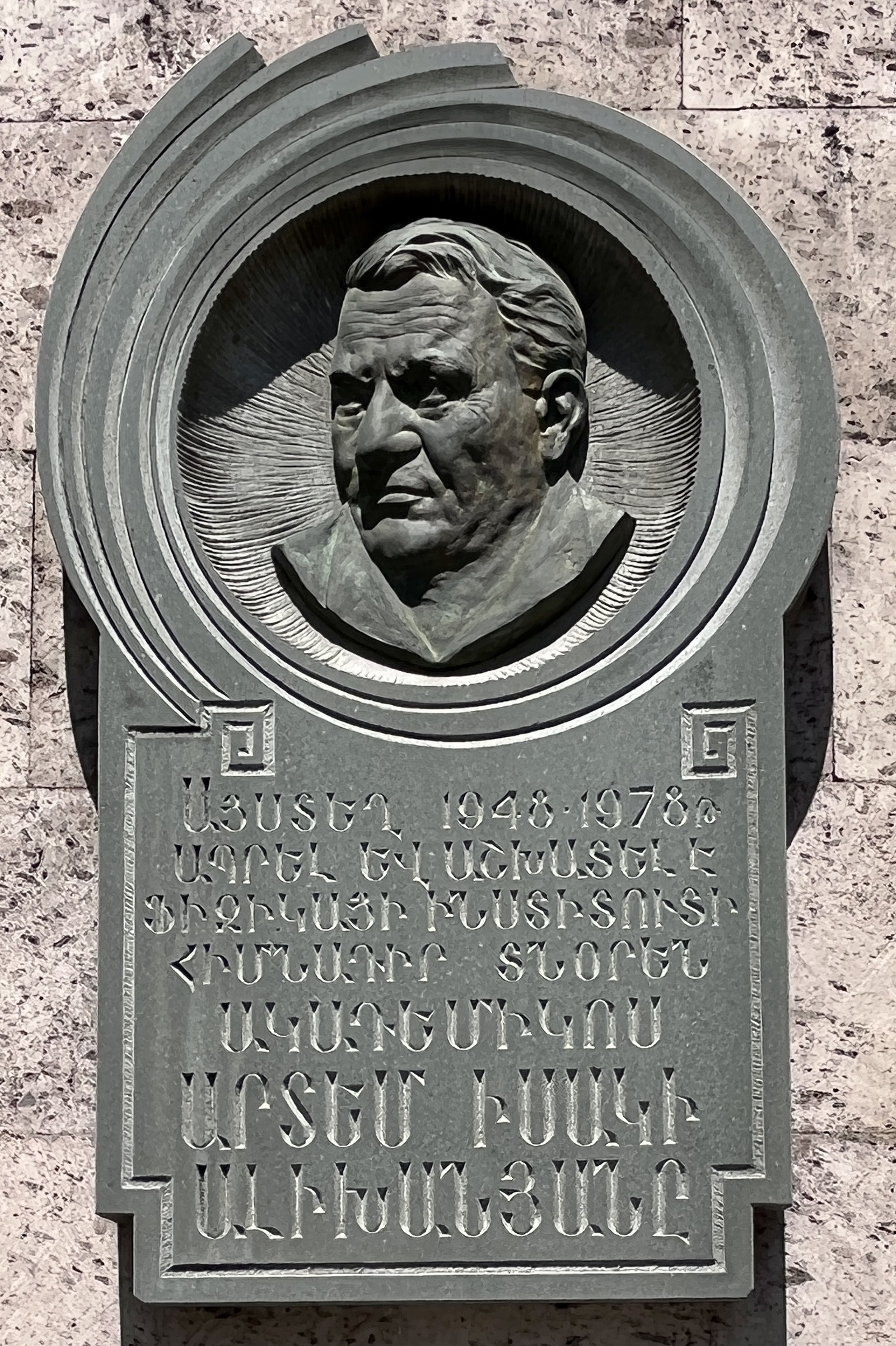
- Born: 24 June 1908; Elizavetpol, Russian Empire
- Died: 25 February 1978 (aged 69); Moscow, Soviet Union
- Education: Leningrad State University
- Scientific career
- Fields: Physics
- Workplaces: Yerevan Physics Institute
- Doctoral students: Boris Dolgoshein; Alevtina Shmeleva

Artem Isaak Alikhanian (Russian: Артём Исаакович Алиханьян; Armenian: Արտեմ Ալիխանյան; 24 June 1908 – 25 February 1978) was a Soviet physicist of Armenian origin, one of the founders and first director of the Yerevan Physics Institute, a correspondent member of the Academy of Sciences of the Soviet Union (1946), academic of the Armenian National Academy of Sciences. With Pyotr Kapitsa, Lev Landau, Igor Kurchatov, Abram Alikhanov and others, he laid the foundations of nuclear physics in the Soviet Union. He is known as the "father of Armenian physics".

== Biography ==
Artem Alikhanian was born in Elizavetpol, Russian Empire, to an Armenian family of a railway engineer and homemaker. They had four children: two sons (the elder, Abram Alikhanov, became a well-known physicist) and two daughters. In 1912 the family moved to Aleksandropol. He worked as a waiter and a newspaper seller. Alikhanian did not attend school regularly; initially he was mostly schooled at home but later he received an external degree from Tiflis school № 100. In 1930, before he graduated from Leningrad State University, he became a staff-member at Leningrad Physico-Technical Institute working together with his elder brother Abram Alikhanov. The work of their group was devoted to the investigation of pair production and of the resultant positron spectrum. For observation of positrons, Alikhanov, his student M. Kozodaev and Alikhanian used an original combination of a magnetic spectrometer and two contiguous Geiger-Müller counters making coincidence counts. This work became a starting point for the application of radio engineering to experimental nuclear physics in the Soviet Union. Before World War II, they carried out fundamental investigations of beta decay, discovered the internal conversion of gamma rays and confirmed experimentally the energy conservation in positron annihilation. In 1934 their research group (B. Dzhelepov, Alikhanov and Alikhanian) was among the pioneers observing the phenomenon of radioactive decay. A method of determining the rest mass of the neutrino, using decay of the nuclei of Be7, was suggested by Alikhanov and Alikhanian in 1938. For their investigations both brothers (without being Communist party members) were awarded the Stalin Prize.

In 1942, they initiated a scientific mission on Mount Aragats in order to search for the third (proton) component of cosmic rays. They found so called narrow showers in cosmic rays and established the first evidence of the existence in cosmic rays of the particles with masses between that of a muon and proton. During the siege of Leningrad Alikhanian and some his colleagues were excused from full-time defense work in order to work on the design of a synchrocyclotron - the accelerator which was eventually constructed in Dubna in 1955. In 1948, A. Alikhanov and A. Alikhanian again were awarded the Stalin Prize for the investigation of cosmic rays. After they founded a cosmic ray station on Aragats at an altitude of 3250 m, the two brothers participated in the foundation of the Armenian Academy of Sciences and established the Yerevan Physics Institute in 1943. A. Alikhanian became its director for the next 30 years. In 1956, Alikhanian, Alikhanov and Viktor Ambartsumian initiated the creation of the Yerevan Synchrotron with 6 GeV energy of electrons.

In 1965, Harvard University invited Alikhanian to give the Loeb and Lee lectures in Physics. He became the first Loeb professor of Harvard University from Europe. Alikhanian was a Doctor of physical-mathematical sciences, Professor of Yerevan State University, head of the physical laboratory in the Lebedev Institute, founder and scientific supervisor of the Nuclear Physics chair in the Moscow Engineering Physics Institute, founder of the high-altitude Aragats and Nor-Amberd research stations. In recognition of his scientific achievements and contribution he was awarded the "Honored Scientist of Armenian SSR" title in 1967.

For the work on wide-gap track spark chambers in 1970 A.Alikhanian together with the colleagues were awarded the Lenin Prize. Later he initiated work on x-ray transition radiation detectors.

== Works ==
Alikhanian's works are dedicated to nuclear physics, cosmic rays and elementary particle physics, accelerator physics and technology. Among with his co-workers Alikhanov, Lev Artsimovich and others, he:

- discovered the production of electron-positron pairs by internal energy conversion (1934),
- experimentally confirmed energy conservation in positron annihilation (1936),
- conducted precision measurements on the data spectra of a large number of radioactive elements and discovered the dependence of spectral shape on the atomic number,
- proposed the experimental method to prove the existence of neutrinos through nuclear recoil in electron capture in 7Be,
- discovered streams of fast protons in the cosmic rays, the intense productions of protons by fast neutrons, the so-called narrow shower, and the first hints of particles with masses ranging between those of the muon and the proton,
- contributed to the development of methods for the detection of high-energy particles, in particular the Alikhanian–Alikhanov spectrometer, wide-gap spark chambers, and X-ray transition radiation detectors.

In 1963 he introduced the idea of creating a spark chamber where the gap between plates was wide enough to be able to observe spark trails of up to 20 cm. This invention was considered one of the major milestones in the history of the Spark Chamber.

He led the construction of 6 GeV Armenian electron synchrotron (Yerevan). Alikhanian was also an experienced educator. From 1961 to 1975 he organized the world-renowned annual International Schools of High Energy Physics at Nor-Amberd, with participation of many academics and Nobel Prize laureates. According to Wolfgang K. H. Panofsky and Raymond Wilson, Alikhanian made "very important contributions to science, in particular, in the use of transition radiation as an important tool in particle detection and identification".

== Personality ==
Alikhanian was also known as a kind and highly inventive personality, his "great erudition captivated everyone". He was in good relations with academicians Isaak Pomeranchuk, Arkady Migdal, Lev Artsimovich and Lev Landau, composer Dmitri Shostakovich (he was a colleague of the composer's wife, Nina Varzar, who died in Armenia, in 1954. She and Alikhanian had an affair allegedly before the outbreak of the WWII, which Shostakovich himself recognized.), writers Mikhail Zoshchenko and Marietta Shaginyan, professor and dissident Yuri Orlov, sculptor Arto Tchakmaktchian, painters Martiros Saryan, Haroutiun Galentz and Minas Avetisyan. Alikhanian organized visits of Arkady Raikin, Andrei Sakharov and Yelena Bonner to Armenia, hosted Joseph Brodsky at his house in Yerevan (as Yuri Orlov writes, there were rumours, that Alikhanian had a web of his own spies, who helped to protect him and his colleagues from the KGB). He actively supported international cooperation of scientists. Alikhanian resigned from his position at YerPhI in 1973 and left Yerevan, after conflicts with very high level Soviet statesmen.

The film Hello, That's Me! is based on Alikhanian's biography. Mitchell A. Wilson, while working on "Meeting at a Far Meridian" novel, visited Alikhanian in Armenia and lived there for several months.

== Remembrance ==
Yerevan Physics Institute and a street in Yerevan are named after him. His statue stands at Alikhanyan Square, Yerevan. Also there is a Memorial Cabinet-museum of Alikhanyan opened in the central building of the Yerevan Physics Institute.

== Selected articles ==
- Alikhanian A.I., Alikhanov A.I., Nikitin S. Highly ionizing particles in soft component of cosmic rays J. Phys., 9, pp. 175–182, 1945.
- Alikhanian A.I., Asatiani T.L. Investigation of Auger Showers. J. Phys., 9, pp. 167–174, 1945.
- Alikhanian A.I., Alikhanov A. I. Varitrons. Journal of Experimental and Theoretical Physics, 21, pp. 1023–1044, 1951 (In Russian).
- Alikhanian A.I., Avakian V.V., Mamidjanyan E.A., et al. A facility for identification of the hadrons with energy 300 GeV with transition radiation detector, Proceedings of the Soviet Academy of Sciences, Physics series, 38, pp. 1993–1995, 1974 (In Russian).

== Awards ==
- Three Order of the Red Banner of Labour (10 June 1945, 24 June 1968, and 8 June 1984)
- Honored Scientist of the Armenian SSR
- Lenin Prize
- Stalin Prize
- Prize of the Council of Ministers of the USSR

== Sources ==
- A. Alikhanian: Essays, Recollections, Documents (mainly in Russian), edited by G. Merzon, Moscow, 2000, 335p.
- Artem Alikhanian in the memories of friends and colleagues, Russian Acad. of Sciences; ed. by E. Mamijanyan, G. Merzon, Moscow, 2008, 342 p.
- Artem Alikhanian, YerPHI CRD
- Alikhanian in Great Soviet Encyclopedia
