= Ashot Chilingarian =

Armenian physicist (born 1949)

- Աշոտ Չիլինգարյան
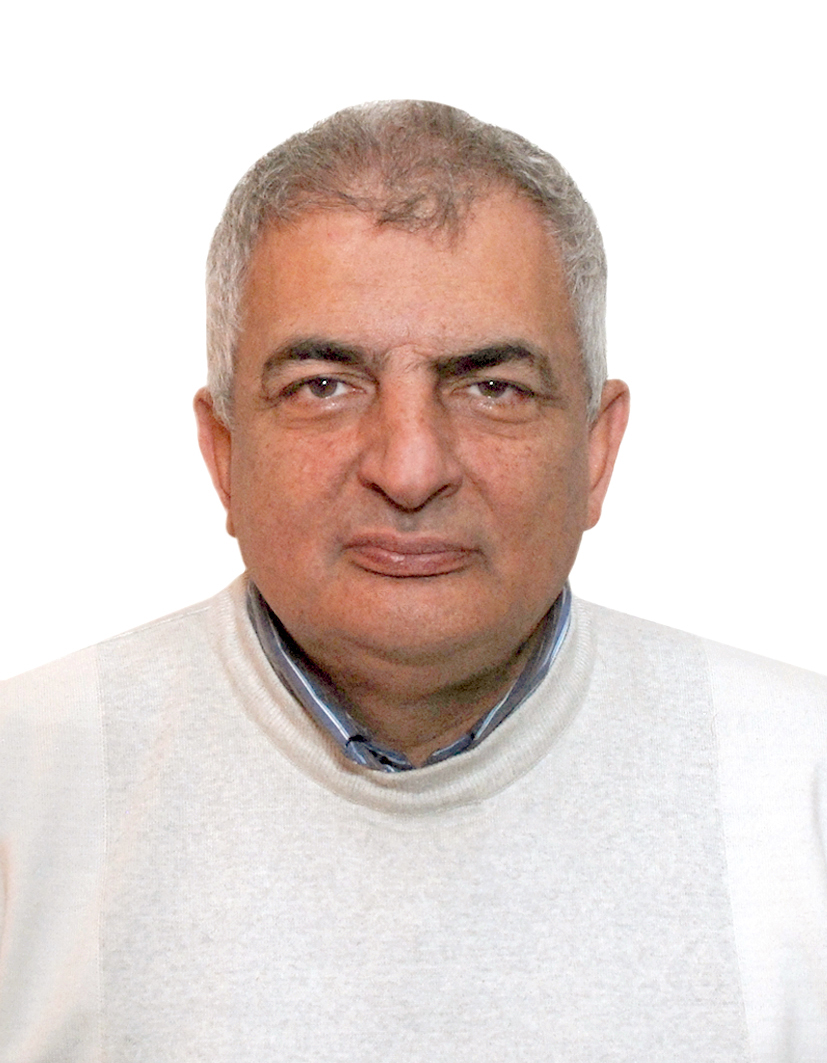
- Born: 18 May 1949 (age 77); Yerevan, Armenia
- Education: Yerevan State University
- Scientific career
- Fields: High-energy astrophysics, space weather
- Workplaces: Alikhanyan Physics Institute

Ashot Chilingarian (Armenian: Աշոտ Չիլինգարյան; born 18 May 1949) is an Armenian physicist known for his contributions to the fields of high-energy astrophysics, space weather, and high-energy atmospheric physics. He is the head of the Cosmic Ray Division (CRD) and the director of the Alikhanyan Physics Institute in Armenia.

== Life and career ==
Chilingarian was born on 18 May 1949, in Yerevan, Armenia into an academic family. His father, Aghasi Chilingarian, was a biologist and the head of the Institute of Zoology of the National Academy of Sciences of Armenia, mother Nora Nazarbekova graduated from Saint Petersburg Chemistry-Technological Institute. His elder sister, Marina Chilingarian graduated from the Armenian State Pedagogical University.

He entered the Faculty of Physics of Yerevan State University in 1966, and in 1971 received his bachelor's degree in nuclear physics. He earned his PhD degree in 1984 and Doctorate of Science in Physics and Mathematics in 1991 from the Yerevan Physics Institute (YerPhi).

As a professor, Chilingarian has significantly contributed to high-energy astrophysics, cosmic rays, and atmospheric physics. These include measuring the "knee" in the energy spectrum of light and heavy cosmic ray nuclei at Aragats between 1998 and 2003, determining the maximum energy of solar proton accelerators in 2005, and developing Neural Network and Bayesian statistical models for gamma ray image purification and galactic nuclei classification. He also created the ANI package for statistical analysis, which has been implemented in various experiments such as WIPPLE, MAGIC, KASCASE, and ANI.

== Awards ==
During his professional life, Chilingarian has received many awards including:

- Winner of the first ever World Summit on Information Society award in e-Science for the Data Visualization Interactive Network project in 2003
- In 2008, Yerevan, Contribution to science by Armenia
- Presidential Award in the field of physics for a series of research papers referred to as "High-energy phenomena in thunderous atmosphere" in 2012

== Affiliations ==
Chilingarian is a member of many professional societies such as:

- Armenia's representative to the International Commission for Space Research (COSPAR)
- Armenia's representative to the International Space Weather Initiative (ISWI)
- Armenia's representative to the European COST (European Cooperation in Science and Technology) action ES0803: "Developing space weather products and services in Europe"
- Founder and spokesperson of the Aragats Space Environmental Center (ASEC)
- Member of American Geophysical Union (AGU)
- Member of the international advisory committee of the European Cosmic Ray symposiums
- Member of the commission on cosmic rays of the Russian Academy of science
- Founder and spokesperson for the Space Environmental Viewing and Analysis Network (SEVAN)
- Fellow of the American Physical Society (APS)
- Associate editor of Space Weather & Space Climate (SWSC) journal

== Selected publications ==
1. F. Aharonyan, A. Konopelko, A. Chilingarian, А. Plyasheshnikov, A multidimensional analysis of the Cherenkov images of air showers induced by very high energy -y-rays and protons, Nuclear Instruments, and Methods, А302, 522 (1991).
2. A.Chilingarian, Detection of Weak Signals Against Background using Neural Network Classifiers, Pattern Recognition Letters, vol. 16, 333 (1995).
3. N. K. Bostanjyan, A. Chilingarian et al ., On the production of the highest energy solar protons on 20 January 2005, J. Adv. Space Res. 39, (2007).
4. A.Chilingarian, G. Hovsepyan, and A. Hovhannisyan, Particle bursts from thunderclouds: Natural particle accelerators above our heads, Physical Review D 83, 062001 (2011).
5. A.Chilingarian, G. Hovsepyan, L. Vanyan, On the origin of the particle fluxes from the thunderclouds: energy spectra analysis, EPL, 106, 59001 (2014).
6. A. Chilingarian, S. Soghomonyan, Y. Khanikyants, D. Pokhsraryan, On the Origin of Particle Fluxes from Thunderclouds, Astroparticle Physics 105 (2019) 54–62
7. A.Chilingarian, G. Hovsepyan, A. Elbekian, T. Karapetyan, L. Kozliner, H. Martoian, and B. Sargsyan, Origin of enhanced gamma radiation in thunderclouds, Physical Review Research, 1, 033167 (2019)# Chilingarian, A., Hovsepyan, G., & Sargsyan, B. (2020). Circulation of Radon progeny in the terrestrial atmosphere during thunderstorms. Geophysical Research Letters, 47, e2020GL091155. https://doi.org/10.1029/2020GL091155
8. A.Chilingarian, G. Hovsepyan, and M. Zazyan, Measurement of TGE particle energy spectra: An insight in the cloud charge structure, Europhysics Letters, 134 (2021) 6901, https://doi.org/10.1209/0295-5075/ac0dfa
9. A.Chilingarian, G.Hovsepyan, T.Karapetyan, B.Sargsyan, and M.Zazyan, Development of the relativistic runaway avalanches in the lower atmosphere above mountain altitudes, EPL, 139 (2022) 50001, https://doi.org/10.1209/0295-5075/ac8763

See the full list of publications here
