= Rebecca Surman =

American theoretical physicist

Rebecca A. Surman is an American theoretical physicist known for her research on nucleosynthesis, the processes that created the atoms in the universe, and particularly on the r-process for creating heavy atomic nuclei in high-energy cosmic events including supernovae, black hole collisions, and gamma-ray bursts. She is a professor of theoretical nuclear physics and astrophysics at the University of Notre Dame.

== Education and career ==
Surman graduated summa cum laude from the State University of New York at Geneseo in 1993, with a bachelor's degree in physics. After earning a master's degree at Michigan State University in 1995, she completed a doctorate in 1998 at the University of North Carolina at Chapel Hill in 1998, under the supervision of Jonathan Engel.

She joined the Union College faculty in 1998 as a visiting assistant professor, and obtained a regular tenure track position in 2000, and was promoted to full professor in 2011. After several terms as a visiting professor at North Carolina State University and the University of Notre Dame, she moved to Notre Dame in 2014, taking a step down in rank to become an associate professor. Notre Dame promoted her to full professor again in 2018.

== Recognition ==
Surman was named a Fellow of the American Physical Society (APS) in 2016, after a nomination by the APS Division of Nuclear Physics, "for contributions in elucidating r-process nucleosynthesis, in particular for connecting microphysics such as mass models and reaction rates to astrophysical environments, and for guiding the experimental efforts worldwide on deciding the most impactful nuclei to study at exotic nuclear beam facilities".
