= Minas Avetisyan =

Armenian painter (1928–1975)

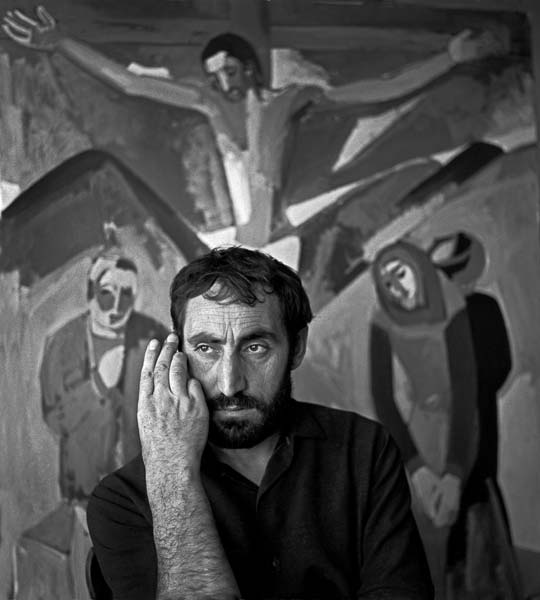
- Born: Minas Avetisyan; July 20, 1928; Jajur, Armenia
- Died: February 24, 1975 (aged 46); Yerevan, Armenia
- Known for: Painting, Drawing
- Notable work: On the way to Deir-Zor, Jajur, Crucifix, Self-portrait with thorns, Churn, A Memory.
- Awards: Merited Artist of Armenia, State Prize of the Armenian SSR (1975), Sarian Prize

Minas Avetisyan (Armenian: Մինաս Ավետիսյան; July 20, 1928 – February 24, 1975) was an Armenian painter.

== Biography ==
Minas Avetisyan was born in the village of Jajur, Armenia. His mother, Sofo, was a daughter of the priest from Kars. His father, Karapet, was a smith from Mush. His wife was Gayane Mamajanyan.

The main theme of his works was Armenian nature, the nature of Jajur, the religion, people, mountains, fields etc.

Avetisyan emerged as an artist at the "Exhibition of Five" in Yerevan (1962). Numerous specialists and visitors to the exhibition appreciated greatly his work. Avetisian's method differs from the method of plein-air painting which was once widespread in Armenian art. For him working from nature was no more than a preliminary stage, and the main portion of the work on the canvas was done in his studio.

In 1967, he first appeared on film in the censored and suppressed documentary The Color of Armenian Land by his friend Mikhail Vartanov.

In 1975, Avetisyan died under the wheels of the car, which stopped off at the sidewalk. According to some sources, he was murdered by the KGB.

== See also ==
- House Museum of Minas Avetisyan
