= Sos Alikhanian =

Soviet geneticist

- Сос Алиханян
- Born: 26 November 1906; Baku, Russian Empire
- Died: 26 January 1985 (aged 78); Moscow, Soviet Union
- Known for: One of the founders of molecular genetics in the USSR
- Scientific career
- Fields: Genetics
- Workplaces: State Research Institute of Genetics (GosNIIgenetika)

Sos Isaakovich Alikhanyan (Russian: Сос Исаакович Алиханян; 26 November 1906 – 26 January 1985) was a Soviet Armenian geneticist and one of the founders of molecular genetics in the USSR. Alikhanyan worked at the Kurchatov Institute of Atomic Energy, Moscow State University, and the State Institute of Genetics and Selection of Industrial Microorganisms. Alikhanyan took active part in organizing and directing the national journal "Genetics".

== Biography ==
Sos Alikhanyan was born in Baku in 1906. He graduated from the school in Tbilisi In 1930 he graduated from the Moscow Institute of National Economy. From 1931 to 1948, he worked at the Department of Genetics in the Moscow State University. In 1956, he worked at the Kurchatov Institute of Atomic Energy and remained there until 1968. Thereafter, he headed the State Research Institute of Genetics and Selection of Industrial Microorganisms which was organized with his efforts in 1968 and thus remained there until 1975. Currently the institute is a leading biotechnology institute of the Russian Federation and the center of modern molecular genetics of microorganisms.

== Publications ==
- Современная генетика, М., 1967. Modern genetics 1967, Moscow, Science - 194 pages. (In Russian)
- Селекция промышленных микроорганизмов, М., 1968. Selection of Industrial Microorganisms 1968, Moscow, Science - 391 pages (In Russian)
- Актуальные вопросы современной генетики. Издательство Московского университета, Actual issues of modern genetics 1966, Medical - 601 pages (In Russian)
- Генетика и селекция микроорганизмов. Genetics and selection of microorganisms 1964, Moscow, Science - 304 pages (In Russian)
- Вопросы молекулярной генетики и генетики микроорганизмов изд."Наука", 1968 Questions of Molecular Genetics and Genetics of Microorganisms - 244 pages (In Russian)
- Общая генетика Высшая школа, 1985, General Genetics School Superior - 445 pages (In Russian)

== Bibliography ==
- Ассоциация выпускников РЭА им. Г.В.Плеханова. Association of graduates of the Russian Economic Academy named after Plekhanov (In Russian) Archive
- История института молекулярной генетики РАН. History of the Institute of Molecular Genetics, Academy of Sciences (In Russian) Archive
- Энциклопедия фонда «Хайазг». Encyclopedia of Fund "Hayazg" (In Russian) Archive

== Links ==
- State Institute of Genetics and Selection of Industrial Microorganisms
- Biography on Genetika.ru (Russian)
