= Abram Alikhanov =

Soviet nuclear physicist (1904–1970)

- Абрам Алиханов
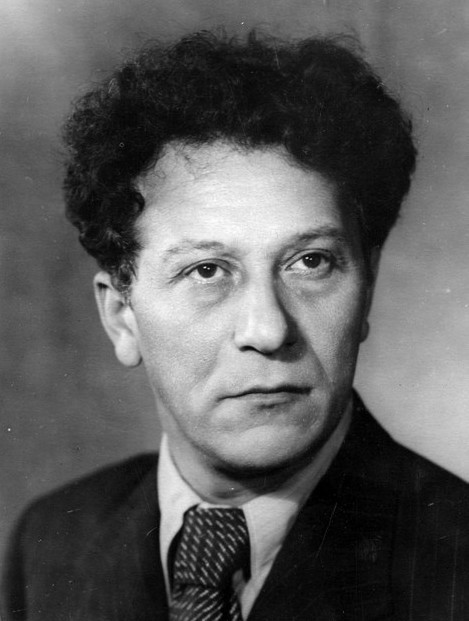
- Alikhanov in 1948
- Born: Abraham Alikhanian; 4 March [O.S. 20 February] 1904; Elizavetpol, Russian Empire (now in Azerbaijan)
- Died: 8 December 1970 (aged 66); Moscow, Soviet Union
- Education: First Polytechnic Institute
- Known for: Soviet atomic bomb project founder of ITEP
- Scientific career
- Fields: Particle and nuclear physics
- Workplaces: Physical-Technical Institute (1927–1941); Laboratory no. 2 (1943–1945); Institute for Theoretical and Experimental Physics (1945–1968)

Abram Isaakovich Alikhanov (Note: Russian: Абрам Исаакович Алиханов.) (ahl-eek-ahn-off; born Abraham Alikhanian; (Note: Armenian: Աբրահամ Ալիխանյան.) 4 March [O.S. 20 February] 1904 – 8 December 1970) was a Soviet experimental physicist of Armenian origin who specialized in particle and nuclear physics. He was one of the Soviet Union's leading physicists.

Before joining the Soviet atomic bomb project, Alikhanov studied X-rays and cosmic rays. Between 1945 and 1968, he directed the Institute for Theoretical and Experimental Physics (ITEP) in Moscow, which was named after him in 2004. He led the development of both the first research and the first industrial heavy water reactors in the Soviet Union. They were commissioned in 1949 and 1951, respectively. Alikhanov was also a pioneer in Soviet accelerator technology. In 1934, he and Igor Kurchatov created a "baby cyclotron", the first "cyclotron" operating outside of Berkeley, California. He was the driving force behind the construction of the 70 GeV synchrotron in Serpukhov (1967), the largest in the world at the time. His brother, Artem Alikhanian, was based in the Armenian SSR and led the Yerevan Physics Institute for many years.

== Early life ==
Alikhanov was born Abraham Alikhanian to Armenian parents on 4 March [O.S. 20 February] 1904 in Elizavetpol, a city then part of the Russian Empire and now part of Azerbaijan. His mother, Yulia Artemevna (née Sulkhanova), was a housewife, while his father, Isahak Alikhanian (d. 1925), was a railroad engineer in the Transcaucasus Railway. Abraham's younger brother, Artem Alikhanian (1908–1978), was also a physicist. (Note: The geneticist Sos Alikhanian is often erroneously called their brother.) They had two sisters: Araksia (b. 1906) and Ruzanna (b. 1913). From 1912 to 1913, the family lived in Alexandropol, where Abraham attended a commercial college. They then moved to Tiflis, where they lived until 1918. The family then moved back to Alexandropol, where they lived until the 1920 Turkish–Armenian War. They then moved back to Tiflis, where Abraham graduated from a commercial college the next year. He then enrolled in the Polytechnic Institute of Tiflis but, for the most part, did not study in order to financially support himself and his family. He worked as a cashier and telephone operator.

== Early career in Leningrad (1927–41) ==
In 1923, Abraham moved to Leningrad and enrolled in the chemistry department of the Polytechnic Institute. He Russified his name to Abram Isaakovich Alikhanov. The next year, he transferred to the department of physics and mechanics, founded by Abram Ioffe. Besides Ioffe, other prominent scientists taught there, including Nikolay Semyonov and Yakov Frenkel. From 1925 to 1927, Alikhanov worked at the Mechnikov Hospital as a radiographer. He graduated in 1929.

=== X-rays (1927–33) ===
In 1927 Alikhanov began working part-time at the Physical-Technical Institute in Leningrad as a researcher focusing on X-rays, X-ray diffraction, and solid-state physics. In 1929 he published his first paper on the use of X-ray analysis in investigating the crystal structure of the copper-aluminium alloy. In 1929, after graduating from the Polytechnic Institute, he was employed by the Physical-Technical Institute full-time. He began a long-time collaboration with his younger brother, Artem, and Lev Artsimovich in 1930. Under the supervision of Pyotr Ivanovich Lukirskii, head of the X-ray laboratory, Alikhanov and Artsimovich studied X-ray optics from 1930 to 1933. Results included a "study of total internal reflection of X-rays from thin layers of various substances." He showed that aluminium does not undergo allotropic transformation when X-rayed at 550–600 °C. He also did a "study of the total internal reflection of X rays from thin layers and the estimation of the depth of their penetration into the medium. Alikhanov also proved that the laws of classical optics can be applied to the reflection of hard X rays." Alikhanov summarized the results in a 1933 monograph titled X-Ray Optics (Оптика рентгеновских лучей).

=== Nuclear physics (1933–41) ===
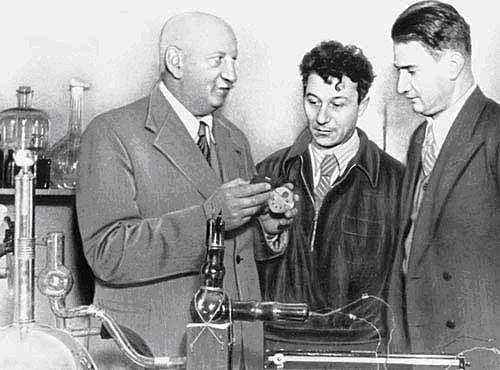
Ioffe, Alikhanov and Kurchatov in the early 1930s

Alikhanov switched to nuclear physics in 1933, following the discovery of the neutron and the positron in 1932. Abram Ioffe appointed Alikhanov head of the positron laboratory at the Department of Solid-State Physics at the Physical-Technical Institute. His group studied pair production and gamma rays and made observations of positrons using Geiger counters. According to Viktor Frenkel, their work became a "starting point for the application of radio engineering to experimental nuclear physics in the Soviet Union."

Abov wrote that in 1933–34 Alikhanov and his colleagues were the "first to study in detail the spectrum of positrons from external pair conversion over the entire energy range. Among other things, they showed that, in accord with relevant theoretical results, the maximum of the spectrum occurs in the vicinity of the positron energy equal to half the endpoint energy." He added, "those investigations made it possible to reveal gamma lines that had previously been unknown, whereby it was possible to reconstruct the diagrams of decays of excited nuclei."

They went on to study beta decay using not the usual Wilson cloud chamber, but a spectrometer developed by Alikhanov and Mikhail Kozodayev. It was a "radically improved" version of the "classical magnetic spectrometer with transverse field, fitting it with a system of coincidence-coupled gas-discharge counters. The use of this registration system was an important methodological novelty. It opened the way to development of Soviet nuclear electronics, which has been advanced in many of its aspects by Alikhanov's students. The new magnetic spectrometer was capable of registering the comparatively infrequent processes of positron production and could be used to investigate their energy spectra, the dependence of positron yield on γ-quantum energy and on the atomic number of the element, etc."

In 1934 Alikhanov and Igor Kurchatov built a "baby cyclotron", which became the first "cyclotron" operating outside of Berkeley, California where Ernest Lawrence had invented it years earlier. It did not operate for long, though some experiments were conducted. The first proper cyclotron in the Soviet Union was built at the Radium Institute in Leningrad by 1936.

Alikhanov "discovered that positrons were present even in the absence of a converter made from a heavy element, and this led him to the discovery of a new phenomenon—production of an electron-positron pair as a result of internal conversion of the energy of the excited nucleus." This was later used in nuclear spectroscopy. Alikhanov's group also studied scattering of fast electrons in matter and beta spectra of radioactive substances. In 1938 Alikhanov discovered a new method of determining the rest mass of the neutrino using decay of the nuclei of ^{7}Be.

He was awarded a PhD in Physical and Mathematical Sciences in 1935. He lectured at the St. Petersburg State Transport University in 1939–41 and chaired its Department of Physics.

== Cosmic rays and Armenia (1941–43) ==
Alikhanov planned to study cosmic rays, the only source of high-energy particles known at that time, in the Pamir Mountains in the summer of 1941, however, due to the approaching Nazi forces, Alikhanov and the Institute for Physical Problems were evacuated to Kazan in October 1941. In April 1942 he moved to Yerevan, Soviet Armenia with the intention to study cosmic rays at Mount Aragats. The expedition to Aragats resulted in the discovery of the "presence of an intense group of protons with comparatively small energies in the soft cosmic-radiation component" and "presence of a stream of fast protons in cosmic radiation."

Alikhanov and his group, including his brother Artem Alikhanian, also erroneously concluded in the existence of cosmic radiation particles, called by them varitrons, which supposedly possessed a broad spectrum of masses. Alikhanov-Alikhanian brothers were widely criticized for the claim. Turkevich noted in 1956 that "this claim was questioned in the West and attacked by a group of Soviet physicists, with a subsequent bitter polemic in the Soviet physics journals. The controversy has never been settled officially, and Soviet cosmic ray research has suffered a lack of prestige." Luis Walter Alvarez noted that the brothers received the Lenin Prize for their unverifiable discoveries and "for them to have retracted their claims would have been embarrassing to their government."

Alikhanov and his brother Artem established the Yerevan Physics Institute (YerPhI) in 1943 as a branch of Yerevan State University.

== Career in Moscow (1943–68) ==
After returning to Russia from Armenia, Alikhanov worked at the Institute for Physical Problems in Moscow from 1944 to 1946.

Between 1947 and 1951 Alikhanov headed the Department of Structure of Matter at the Faculty of Physics and Technology of Moscow State University. He helped organize the Nuclear Physics Division of the Soviet Academy of Sciences.

Among Alikhanov's students were Boris S. Dzhelepov, Venedikt P. Dzhelepov, Mikhail S. Kozodaev, Sergey Ya. Nikitin, Pyotr E. Spivak.

=== Atomic bomb project ===
Alikhanov was involved in the Soviet atomic bomb project. After the Soviet authorities learned of the German, British and American programs of nuclear weapons in mid-1942, works began on the Soviet project led by Igor Kurchatov. At Laboratory no. 2, Alikhanov was assigned to develop a nuclear pile with heavy water. Lev Artsimovich, Isaak Kikoin, and Anatoly Alexandrov worked on electromagnetic isotope separation, gaseous diffusion process and thermal diffusion process, respectively. While Alikhanov led the research on the construction of a heavy-water reactor. In August 1945 the Special Committee under the Council of Ministers (Council of People's Commissars) was formed to oversee works on uranium, headed by Lavrentiy Beria. The Scientific-Technical Council was headed by Boris Vannikov and included Alikhanov (initially as it scientific secretary), Igor Kurchatov, Pyotr Kapitsa, Abram Ioffe and others.

=== ITEP ===
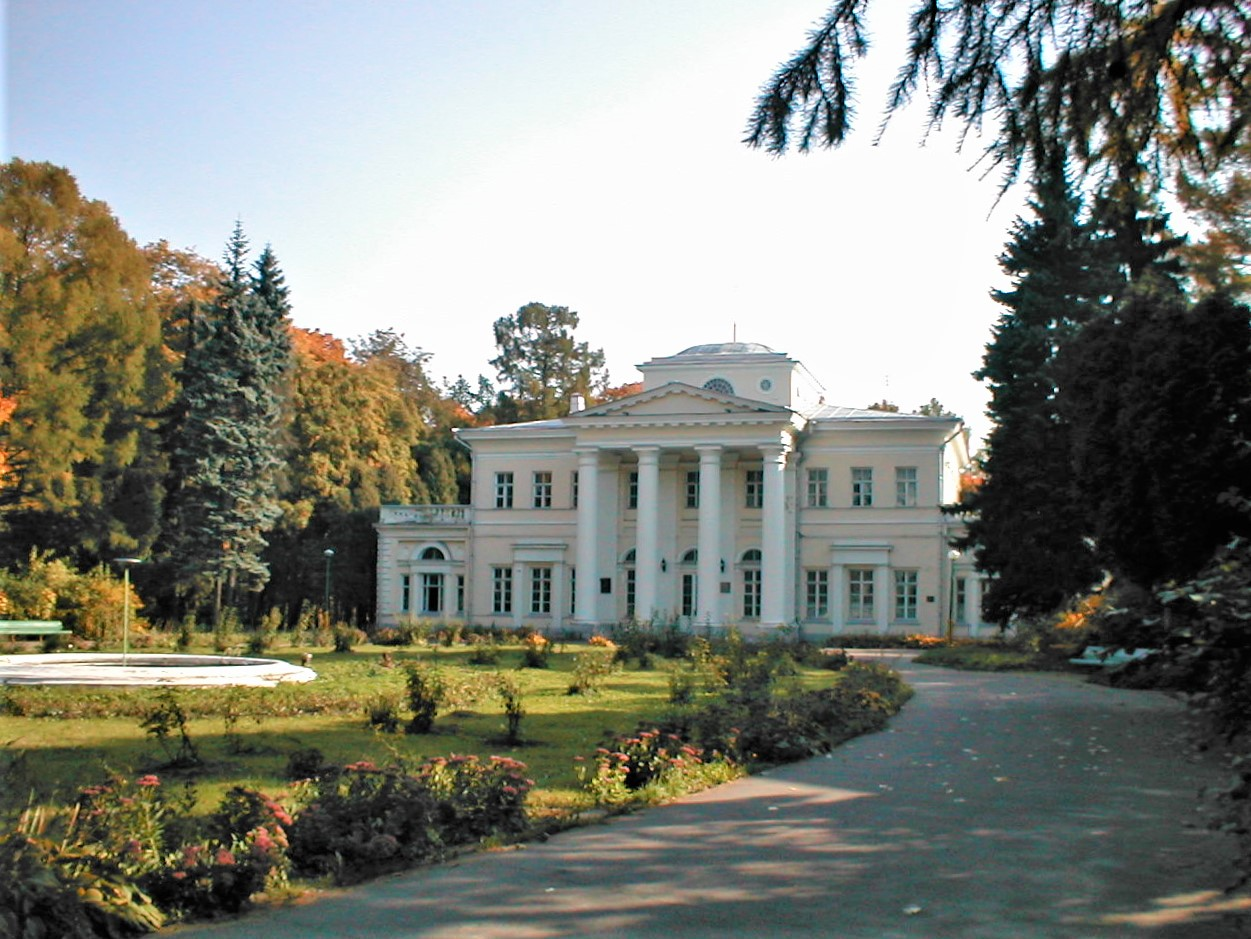
The Institute for Theoretical and Experimental Physics (ITEP) in Moscow

On December 1, 1945, Laboratory no. 3 of the Soviet Academy of Sciences was established in Moscow with Alikhanov as its head. The laboratory was renamed to Heat-Engineering Laboratory (Теплотехническая лаборатория) in 1949 and received its modern name, the Institute for Theoretical and Experimental Physics (ITEP), in 1958. Alikhanov lead the institute for 23 years, until he retired in 1968. Lev Landau and his student Isaak Pomeranchuk headed the theory division of the institute in 1945–46 and 1946–66, respectively.

At ITEP, Alikhanov led research on and advanced scintillation techniques, bubble chambers, and spark chambers.

==== Nuclear reactor ====
The laboratory/institute initially focused on what Alikhanov had already begun working on: construction of a nuclear reactor based on heavy water. With a small staff, Alikhanov led the design of the first reactor by 1947. It was built in 1948 and successfully put into operation on April 25, 1949. Alikhanov was personally heavily involved in the project. He solved all the "physical and technical problems that arose in construction of the reactor," and tackled the "dirtiest jobs without hesitation; thus the reactor was for the most part his creature." It was the first heavy-water research reactor in the USSR. A number of studies and discoveries were done based on it. It was shut down in 1987.

The reactor was not invented for nuclear power generation, but instead for experiments that would advance the design and construction of other reactors. In 1959 Alikhanov led the design of 10 MW experimental research heavy-water reactors, which were built in China and Yugoslavia under his supervision.

Alikhanov also led the project of design the first industrial heavy-water reactor in the Soviet Union. Named OK-180, it was commissioned in October 1951 in Chelyabinsk-65. Its heat exchangers froze shortly after it began operating. It was decommissioned in 1965 and subsequently disassembled. Until the end of his career, Alikhanov "remained a renowned head and a strong advocate" of heavy-water reactors, though graphite-moderated reactors were given the preference for their price.

==== Accelerators ====
By 1952, after the completion of the heavy-water reactor, the main direction of Alikhanov's institute became construction of a high-energy accelerator. A proton accelerator with a strong focusing of 7 GeV (gigaelectronvolt) was completed and commissioned at the institute in 1961. The accelerator made it possible to conduct research on elementary particle physics on a broader scale at ITEP. Alikhanov led several studies and investigations based on the new instrument, most notably research on "pion scattering on nucleons with large momentum transfer."

The 7-GeV accelerator served as a prototype or an operating model for the 70-GeV accelerator in Serpukhov, which was advanced by Alikhanov. Alikhanov "became a motive force behind construction of the Serpukhov accelerator." Alikhanov and his team participated in its design. The Serpukhov accelerator was commissioned in 1967 and became the largest proton accelerator in the world at the time.

Mikhail Shifman noted that Alikhanov was the "driving force behind the decision to build the first strong focusing accelerators" in the Soviet Union: at ITEP and at the Institute for High Energy Physics (IHEP) in Protvino, near Serpukhov. The Serpukhov accelerator, construction on which had begun in 1960, was transferred to the IHEP. Abov noted that the decision by the Ministry of Defense was an "irreparable blow" for Alikhanov, because it "deprived the institute of any prospects for further development." The Ministry had alleged that the construction of the accelerator was slow, however, according to Abov, the Ministry had made a decision to transfer it to the IHEP from the very beginning.

==== Parity violation ====
Between 1957 and 1960, following the Wu experiment, Alikhanov oversaw the research on parity violation in beta decay. Studies led by him confirmed Wu's findings and explored the structure of weak interaction. Alikhanov was the first Soviet physicist to investigate it. He measured the longitudinal polarization of electrons in β decay.

== Personal life and death ==
Alikhanov was known to his family and friends as "Abusha" (Абуша). A group of his colleagues and students wrote that he was "extremely straightforward and generous in his dealings with people, irrespective of whether the matter was a scientific or a merely personal problem," while David Holloway described him as "hot-tempered."

Alikhanov was a close and lifelong friend of his colleague Lev Artsimovich. He frequented Artsimovich's apartment to tell stories about his friends the satirist Mikhail Zoshchenko, the poet Anna Akhmatova, and the composer Dmitri Shostakovich. The Armenian artist Martiros Sarian, a friend of his, painted a portrait of Alikhanov. It is owned by the Alikhanov family.

Alikhanov married twice. He had two children with his first wife, Anna Grigorievna Prokofieva, whom he married in 1925. His son, Ruben, was a physicist, while his daughter, Seda, was a writer. His second wife, Slava Solomonovna Roshal (1916–2016) was a violinist. They had two children: Tigran (1943–2013), a pianist, and Yevgenia (b. 1949), a violinist. Tigran served as rector (president) of the Moscow Conservatory in 2005–09.

Alikhanov suffered a stroke in 1964. He resigned from his post as director of the ITEP in 1968. Alikhanov died in Moscow on December 8, 1970, at the age of 66. He was buried at the Novodevichy Cemetery in Moscow.

== Relationship with the Communist Party ==
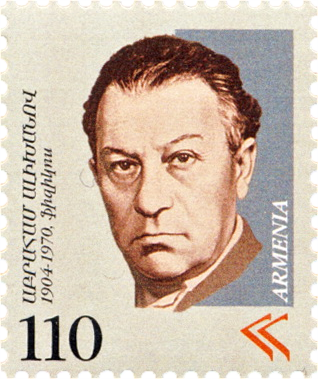
Alikhanov on a 2000 stamp of Armenia

Alikhanov never joined the Communist Party. According to his colleague Boris L. Ioffe, Alikhanov "did not like the Soviet regime" and was "fairly outspoken." He told his colleagues that Lavrentiy Beria, Stalin's secret police chief, was a "dreadful person" before Beria's downfall and was the only major physicist who visited Pyotr Kapitsa when he was sent into exile near Moscow on Stalin's orders. Alikhanov later signed a collective letter addressed to the Soviet leaders asking them to return Kapitsa to the head of the Institute for Physical Problems.

In 1944 Alikhanov, along with Abram A. Ioffe, and Pyotr Kapitsa successfully appealed to Vice Premier Vyacheslav Molotov to prevent Anatoly Vlasov from assuming the chair of the Department of Theoretical Physics at the Faculty of Physics of the Moscow State University (MSU). Instead, Vladimir Fock was appointed.

He did not collaborate with the authorities during the antisemitic anti-cosmopolitan and the Doctors' plot campaigns in the post-war years when Jews were fired from their workplaces. Abov noted that Alikhanov protected his colleagues during the campaign, though "of course, there were victims, but he was able to minimize them."

In October 1955 Alikhanov was among a number of leading Soviet scientists who signed the "Letter of 300" criticizing Trofim Lysenko and Lysenkoism and supporting genetics.

In 1956 Alikhanov came under pressure when several members of the ITEP staff gave pro-democracy speeches at the institute's Communist Party organization. The party organization was disbanded. Alikhanov had a meeting with Khrushchev and the latter told him that he sought to prevent the arrest of the dissidents. In his turn, Alikhanov told the dissidents: "If you knew what you were doing, you're heroes. If you didn't, you're fools." Yuri Orlov, one of the dissidents who was forced to leave ITEP, found work at the Yerevan Physics Institute, headed by Alikhanov's brother, Artem.

Orlov noted that after Khrushchev's denunciation of Stalin in 1956, Alikhanov was among "some 20-30 leading physicists" who "were very active in writing collective letters (not for publication, of course) to the [Soviet] leaders protesting attempts to restore or protect Stalinism" when "the majority of scientists [...] were afraid to participate in such activity." In March 1966 he joined Pyotr Kapitsa, Andrei Sakharov and others calling on Leonid Brezhnev not to rehabilitate Stalin.

== Recognition and legacy ==
"For all of the many facets of his scientific career, Alikhanov was primarily an experimental physicist—an experimentor in the highest sense of the word, as exemplified by Faraday and Rutherford."

— from obituary in Uspekhi Fizicheskikh Nauk (1974)

The Institute for Theoretical and Experimental Physics (ITEP), which Alikhanov led from its inception in 1945 until 1968, was named after him in 2004.

Alikhanov is widely recognized as one of the leading Soviet physicists. A 1974 obituary in Soviet Physics Uspekhi called Alikhanov "one of the founders of nuclear physics in our country." Mikhail Shifman described Alikhanov as the founder of experimental nuclear and particle physics in the Soviet Union, along with Igor Kurchatov, and one of the "fathers" of Soviet particle physics, along with Lev Landau and Isaak Pomeranchuk. Yuri Abov opined that Alikhanov's research from 1933 to 1940 was worthy of a Nobel Prize.

In a 1945 letter to Stalin, Pyotr Kapitsa wrote: "Comrades Alikhanov, Ioffe, and Kurchatov are as competent as I or even more so." Yuri Orlov suggested that Alikhanov "was not such a genius as Landau or Kapitsa", but argued that he was "a distinguished scientist and honest man", who transmitted to his students "his awesomely high standards."

A street in Yerevan is named for the Alikhanian brothers, while Academician Alikhanov Street in Moscow was renamed in 2018.

An hour long documentary film on Alikhanov was produced by the Public TV of Armenia in 2019.

=== Honors ===
Awards

- Stalin Prize (1941, 1948, 1953)
- Order of the Red Banner of Labour (1964)
- Order of Lenin (1945, 1953)
- Hero of Socialist Labour (1954)

Membership

- Corresponding member of the Soviet Academy of Sciences (January 1939)
- Full member (Academician) of the Soviet Academy of Sciences (27 September 1943)
- Full member (Academician) of the Armenian Academy of Sciences (1943)
- Foreign member of the Serbian Academy of Sciences and Arts (1962)
