= Yerevan Physics Institute =

Research institute in Armenia

Coordinates: 40°12′23″N 44°29′06″E

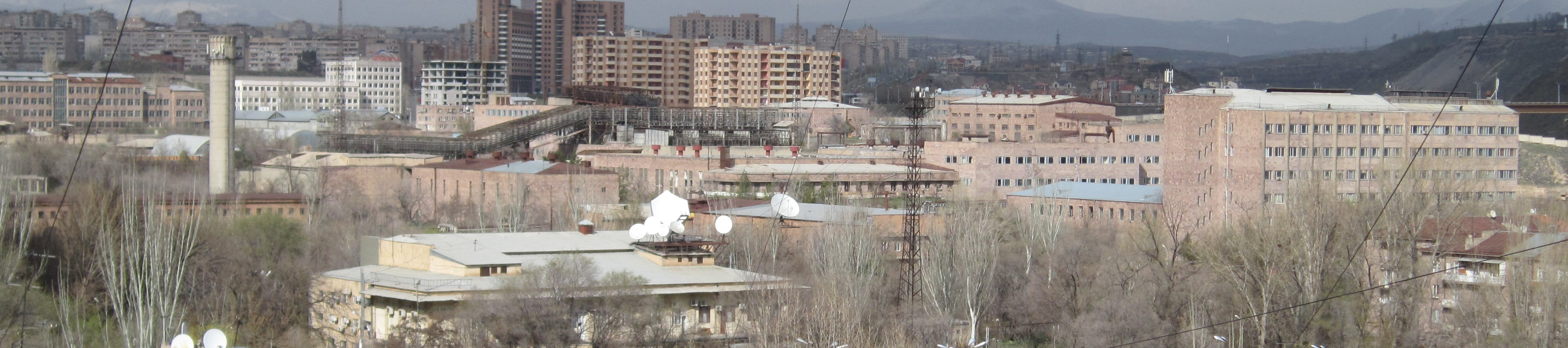
Yerevan Physics Institute

The A.I. Alikhanyan National Science Laboratory (Armenian: Ա.Ի. Ալիխանյանի անվան Ազգային Գիտական Լաբորատորիա) is a research institute located in Yerevan, Armenia. It was founded in 1943 as a branch of the Yerevan State University by brothers Abram Alikhanov and Artem Alikhanian. It was often referred to by the acronym YerPhI (Yerevan Physics Institute). In 2011 it was renamed to its current name A.I. Alikhanyan National Science Laboratory.

== History and strategy ==
The Yerevan Physics Institute was founded in 1943 as a branch of the Yerevan State University by brothers Abraham Alikhanov and Artem Alikhanian. Later two high-altitude cosmic ray stations were founded on Mount Aragats (3,200 m) and Nor Amberd (2,000 m).

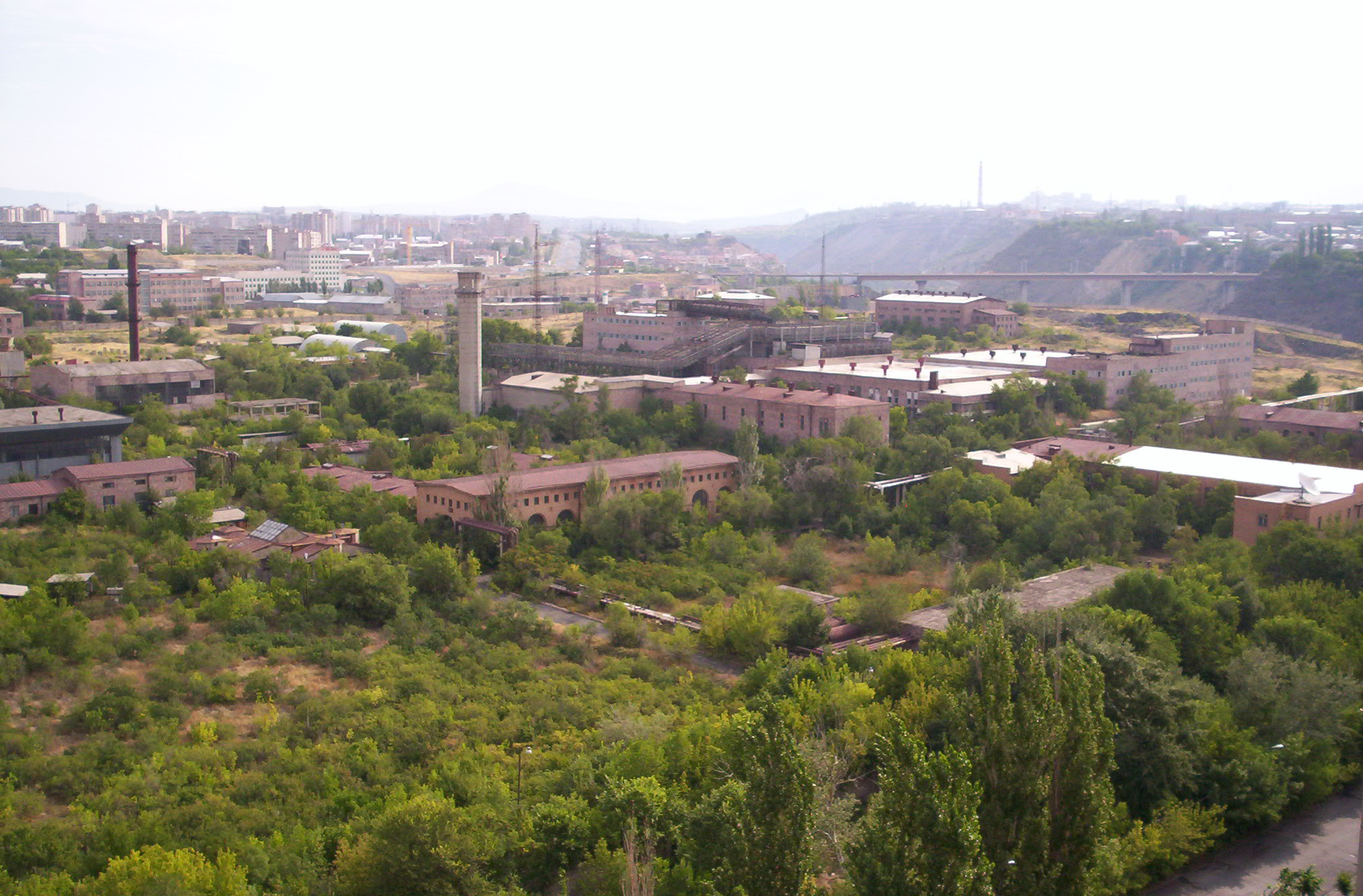
The view of the Yerevan Physics Institute

In 1963 the institute was transferred to the Soviet Union Atomic Energy State Committee. The construction of a 6 GeV electron synchrotron accomplished in 1967 became an important landmark in the history of institute, it is the first particle accelerator in Armenia (Arus "ԱՐՈՒՍ"). After collapse of Soviet Union YerPhI continued research in the fields of high-energy physics and astrophysics in Armenia and worldwide using world biggest accelerators and cosmic ray detectors. Now YerPhI get status of A. Alikhanyan National Laboratory.

=== Brief summary of scientific activities ===
Among the key results of YerPhI in the early years were the discovery of protons and neutrons in cosmic rays, and the establishment of the first evidence of existence of the particles with masses between that of muons and protons. The high altitude research stations have remained the main research base of the Cosmic Ray Division (CRD) of YerPhI until now. Among the CRD achievements there were: discovery of sharp knee in light components of primary cosmic rays, detection of the highest energy protons accelerated on the Sun, and the creation of the Aragats Space environ¬mental Center in 2000 for studies of the solar-terrestrial connection, where CRD becomes one of the world's leaders.

The 6 GeV electron synchrotron was accomplished in 1967. During 1970-1991 synchrotron was operated with energies up to 4,5 GeV and in Experimental Physics Division were obtained significant results, including: hadronic properties of photons in π- meson photo-production on nuclei; structures of nucleon resonances in multi-polarization experiments, structure and characteristics of nuclear matter, important properties of X-ray transition radiation and channeling in monocrystals. Thanks to these achievements physicists from Yerevan Physics Institute started from 1985 are successfully participating in the large international collaborations.

Traditional topic of YerPhI is the development of new particle detectors. Wide spark chambers and transition radiation detectors are examples of the experimental techniques developed and implemented in YerPhI. During the last years groups of scientists from Yerevan Physics Institute have actively participated in intermediate and high energy physics experiments abroad (JLAB, DESY, CERN-LHC, MAX-lab, MAMI), exploring the meson and nucleon structures, electromagnetic interactions of the nucleon, quark-hadron duality, short range nucleon-nucleon correlations, quark hadronization in nuclear medium, physics beyond standard model, Higgs boson searches, quark-gluon plasma, fission and fragmentation of nuclei and hypernuclei and many other topics, as well as constructing experimental hardware and develop the software for data acquisition and analysis. The theoretical department assure major achievements in the following areas: B-meson physics, QCD and Related Phenomenology, Neutrino physics, Quantum Field Theory, String/M-theory, Integrable Models, Statistical physics, Condensed Matter and Quantum Information. These results are internationally recognized and highly cited.

In the mid-1980s in YerPhI was developed the concept of stereoscopic approach in Very High Energy gamma-ray astronomy using multiple Imaging Atmospheric Cherenkov Telescopes (IACT). This concept was materialized in the very successful IACT system (HEGRA). After first success, Armenian physicists successfully participate in operation of the IACT systems on the Canary islands (MAGIC) and in Namibia (H.E.S.S.). In the course of many years, the Applied Physics Department of YerPhI successfully investigates electron-energy structure of new wide-band laser materials using synchrotron radiation in various spectral regions. The investigations were carried in DESY and will be continued in MaxLab- II (Sweden).

Below are the integral parameters characterizing the efficiency of research conducted by national lab: number of publications and citations. The sizable enlargement of both parameters during last years is apparent. National lab scientists publish appr. 30% of scientific publications of Armenia. Most of publications appear in high impact factor journals; high quality of research in national lab is proved by citations – more than 60% of overall citations to papers published by scientists from Armenia belong to national lab.

== Structure ==
The YerPhI has seven divisions and Computer Centre.

Experimental physics workshops are also parts of the institute. The main fields of research are:

- elementary particle physics
- nuclear physics
- cosmic ray physics and astrophysics
- theoretical physics
- condensed matter physics
- radiobiology
- Isotop investigation and production
- computer networking, computing
- educational programme

Directors

- Artem Alikhanian (1943–1973)
- Andrey Amatuni (1973–1992)
- Ruben Mkrtchyan (1992–2001)
- Hrachia Asatryan (2001–2008)
- Ashot Chilingarian (2008–2018)
- Ani Aprahamian (2018–2023)
- Gevorg Karyan (2023-present)
