= Jajur =

Jajur Ջաջուռ
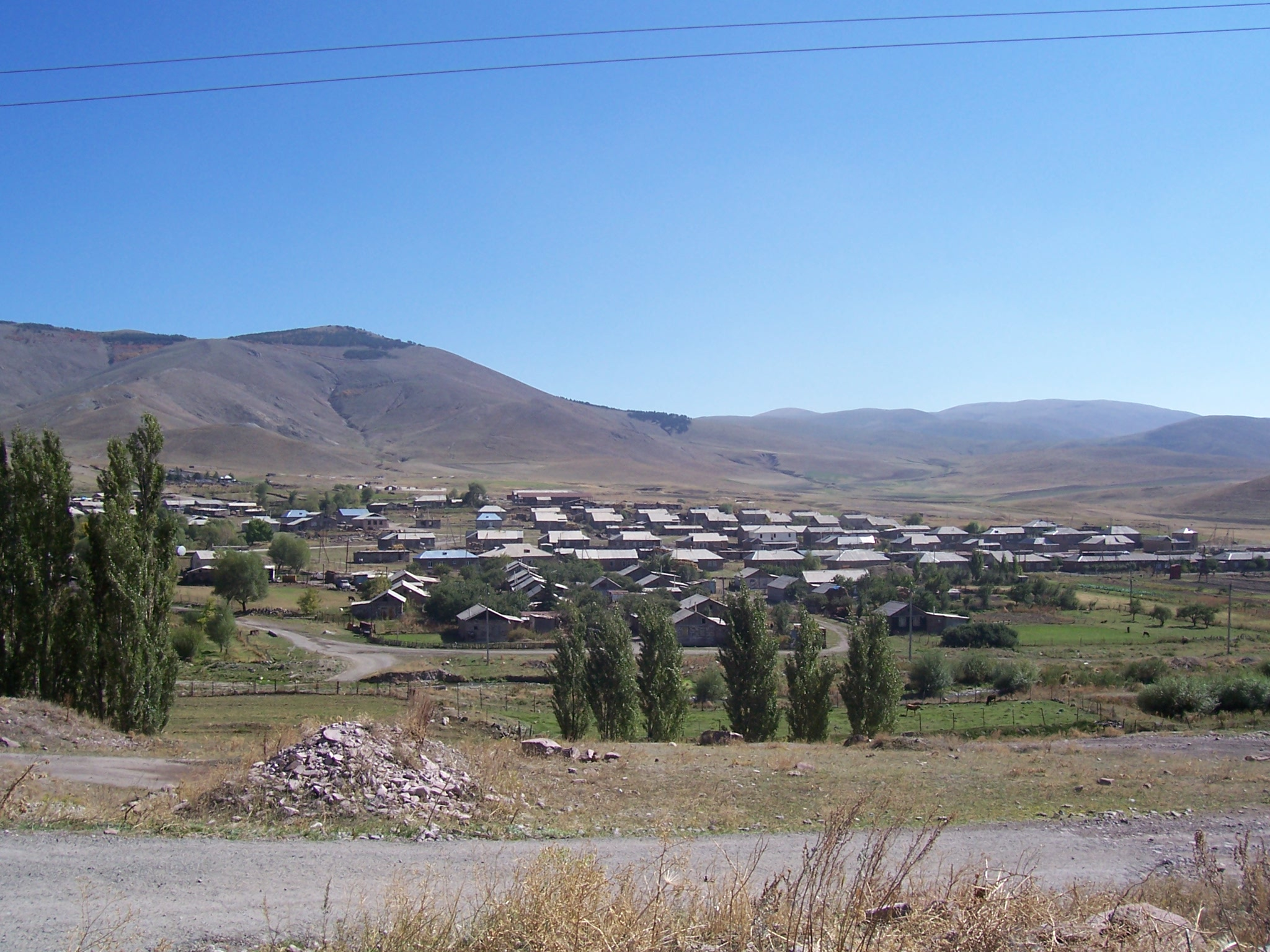
- Jajur

- Location within Armenia Location within Shirak
- Coordinates: 40°51′02″N 43°56′53″E
- Country: Armenia
- Province: Shirak
- Municipality: Akhuryan

Population (2011)
  - Total: 830
- Time zone: UTC+4
  - Summer (DST): UTC+5

Jajur (Armenian: Ջաջուռ) is a village in the Akhuryan Municipality of the Shirak Province of Armenia. The village was established in 1828 when a lime extraction facility was established nearby.

== Demographics ==
Historical population
Year	Pop.	±% p.a.
1831	486	—
1897	1,517	+1.74%
1926	797	−2.19%
1939	1,092	+2.45%
1959	815	−1.45%
1970	887	+0.77%
1979	742	−1.96%
1989	563	−2.72%
2001	824	+3.23%
2011	830	+0.07%
